= Ellis (given name) =

- Pronunciation: /ˈɛlɪs/
- Gender: Unisex
- Language: English; Welsh

Origin
- Languages: 1. Welsh; 2. English
- Origin: Ellis (surname)
- Region of origin: Wales and England

Other names
- Variant forms: Ellice; Elis
- Related names: Ellison, Ellie

Ellis is a given name of Welsh and English origin. Notable people with the given name include:

== Men ==
- Ellis (Nez Perce) (c. 1810–1848), Native American leader
- Ellis Amburn (1933–2018), American book editor and biographer
- Ellis Bent (1783–1815), British-Australian lawyer and judge
- Ellis B. Bodron (1923–1997), American lawyer and politician
- Ellis Burks (born 1964), American Major League Baseball player
- Ellis Chapman (born 2001), English footballer
- Ellis Davies (politician) (1871–1939), Welsh politician and lawyer
- Ellis Davies (priest) (1872–1962), Welsh priest and antiquarian
- Ellis Reginald Davies (1929–2009), Welsh footballer
- Ellis Thomas Davies (1822–1895), Welsh Independent minister
- Ellis R. Dungan (1909–2001), American film director, best known for his work in Indian, particularly Tamil, films
- Ellis Genge (born 1995), English rugby union player
- Ellis Ellis-Griffith (1860–1926), British barrister and politician
- Ellis Griffith (priest) (died 1938), Welsh clergyman
- Ellis Hall (footballer) (1889–1949), English footballer
- Ellis Hall (musician) (born 1951), American singer-songwriter, multi-instrumentalist, and actor
- Ellis Harrison (born 1994), Welsh footballer
- Ellis Hollins (born 1999), English actor
- Ellis Howard (born 1997), English actor
- Ellis Jenkins (born 1993), Welsh rugby union player
- Ellis N. Johnson Jr. (1826–1902), American politician and educator from Ohio
- Ellis Johnson (baseball) (1892–1965), pitcher in Major League Baseball
- Ellis T. Johnson (1910–1990), American college football coach
- Ellis L. Johnson (1938–2024), American industrial engineer and mathematician
- Ellis Johnson (American football, born 1943) (1943–2026), American football halfback and wide receiver
- Ellis Johnson (American football coach) (born 1951), American football coach
- Ellis Johnson (defensive lineman) (born 1973), American football defensive tackle
- Ellis Jones (disambiguation)
- Ellis Stanley Joseph (1872?–1938), Welsh-American animal trainer
- Ellis Kadoorie (1865–1922), Jewish entrepreneur and philanthropist prominent in Hong Kong
- Ellis Lloyd (disambiguation)
- Ellis Marsalis (disambiguation)
- Ellis Merriweather (born 1999), American football player
- Ellis Minns (1874–1953), British academic and archaeologist
- Ellis Paxson Oberholtzer (1868-1936), American historian
- Ellis R. Ott (died 1981), American statistician and educator
- Ellis Owusu-Dabo (born 2000), Ghanaian academic and Pro Vice-Chancellor
- Ellis Paul (born 1965), American singer-songwriter and folk musician
- Ellis Rabb (1930–1998), American actor and director
- Ellis Roberts (disambiguation)
- Ellis Rubin (1925–2006), American attorney famous for handling lost causes
- Ellis Sandoz (1931–2003), American academic and political scientist
- Ellis Short (born 1960), American businessman, former owner and chairman of English football club Sunderland A.F.C.
- Ellis Simms (born 2001), English footballer
- Ellis Taylor (born 2003), English footballer
- Ellis Valentine (born 1954), American baseball player
- Ellis Wackett (1901–1984), Royal Australian Air Force senior engineer

== Women ==
- Ellis Avery (1972–2019), American writer
- Ellis Baker (1898–1984), American actress
- Ellis Bendix (1907–1951), Danish actress
- Ellis Bell (1818–1848), pen name of English novelist and poet Emily Brontë
- Ellis Bermingham, Countess of Brandon (1708–1789), English-Irish aristocrat
- Ellis Brandon (1923–2024), Dutch veteran (Engelandvaarders)
- Ellis Credle (1902–1998), American writer
- Ellis Faas (1962–2020), Dutch make-up artist
- Ellis Jeffreys (1868?–1943), English actress
- Ellis Kaut (1920–2015), German author
- Ellis Knight (1757–1837), English gentlewoman, traveller, landscape artist, and writer of novels, verse, journals, and history
- Ellis MacDonnell, Countess of Antrim (c. 1583–1665), Irish aristocrat
- Ellis Meng, American professor
- Ellis Meredith (1865–1955), American suffragist, journalist and novelist
- Ellis Miller (born 2002), British slalom canoeist
- Ellis O'Reilly (born 1998), Irish-English female artistic gymnast
- Ellis Peters (1913–1995), English author
- Ellis Powell, an actress who played the lead role in Mrs Dale's Diary
- Ellis Rowan (1848–1922), Australian artist and botanical illustrator
- Ellis Reynolds Shipp (1847–1939), American doctor
- Ellis Wheeler (born 2001), American professional soccer player

== Fictional characters ==
- Ellis Carver, a character from The Wire

== See also ==
- Ellis (surname)
- Ellis (disambiguation)
