= Anne Nurmi =

Finnish musical artist

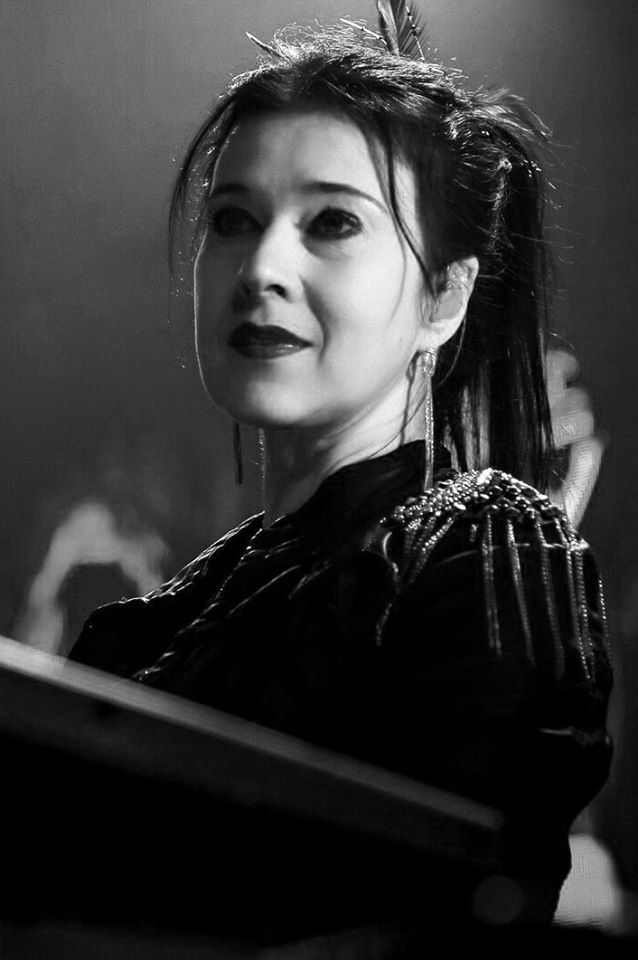
- Anne Nurmi in 2018

Background information
- Born: 22 August 1968 (age 57); Tampere, Finland
- Genres: Gothic rock Gothic metal Dark wave
- Occupation: Musician
- Instruments: Vocals, Keyboard instruments

Anne Marjanna Nurmi (born 22 August 1968) is a Finnish singer, composer and keyboard player who is a member of the band Lacrimosa. She lives in Switzerland.

Nurmi was born in Tampere. In her youth she sang in church choirs and began playing keyboards. Nurmi is a contralto singer.

In 1987, Nurmi and a singer named Jyrki started a gothic rock band called Noidat (Finnish: The Witches). In 1989, two more members, Nauku and Toby, joined the band. The band then changed its name to Two Witches and started writing its lyrics in English.

In 1993, Two Witches toured together with Lacrimosa, where Anne met the German-born musician Tilo Wolff. Tilo was so fascinated by Anne's voice that he invited her to join his project and so Anne became a member of Lacrimosa in 1993.

== Discography ==
=== Lacrimosa albums ===
==== Studio albums ====
Year	Title	Peak positions				
Year	Title	GER	SWI	AUT	MEX	POL
1991	Angst	–	–	–	–	–
1992	Einsamkeit	–	–	–	–	–
1993	Satura	–	–	–	–	–
1995	Inferno	81	–	–	–	–
1997	Stille	64	–	–	–	–
1999	Elodia	12	–	–	–	–
2001	Fassade	20	–	–	–	31
2003	Echos	13	–	–	–	–
2005	Lichtgestalt	30	–	–	–	21
2009	Sehnsucht	35	82	68	49	–
2012	Revolution	35	–	–	–	–
2015	Hoffnung	28	–	–	–	–
2017	Testimonium	32	–	–	–	–
2021	Leidenschaft	–	–	–	–	–

==== Live albums ====
Year	Title	Peak positions	
Year	Title	GER	MEX
1998	Live (2 CD)	–	–
2007	Lichtjahre (2 CD)	70	64

==== Compilations ====
Year	Title	Peak positions	
Year	Title	GER	MEX
2002	Vintage Classix (7 LPs)	–	
2010	Schattenspiel	51	51
