= Elis (disambiguation) =

Elis is a regional unit of Greece.

Elis may also refer to:

== Places ==
- Ancient Elis, the ancient Greek city-state
- Elis (city), the capital of the ancient Greek city-state
- Elis (constituency), a legislative constituency in Greece
- Elis (Arcadia), a town of ancient Arcadia, Greece
- Elis Province, a province of Greece
- Elis, Iran, a village in East Azerbaijan Province, Iran

== Music ==
- Elis (band), a gothic metal band
- Elis (1972 album), an album by Elis Regina
- Elis (1977 album), an album by Elis Regina
- Elis (1980 album), an album by Elis Regina
- "Elis" (song), a 2001 song by Erben der Schöpfung

== Other uses ==
- Elis (given name)
- Elis (surname)
- Elis (students), nickname for students at Yale University
- Elis (horse)
- Metropolis of Elis and Olena, Roman Catholic titular see
- Elis SA, French company, component of SBF 120 index
- Eye Level Integrated School (ELIS), a premium international school brand by Daekyo

== See also ==
- Elias (disambiguation)
- Ilida (municipality)
- Ellis (disambiguation)
- Elys (disambiguation)
- El Limonar International School (disambiguation)
