= Sabine Dünser =

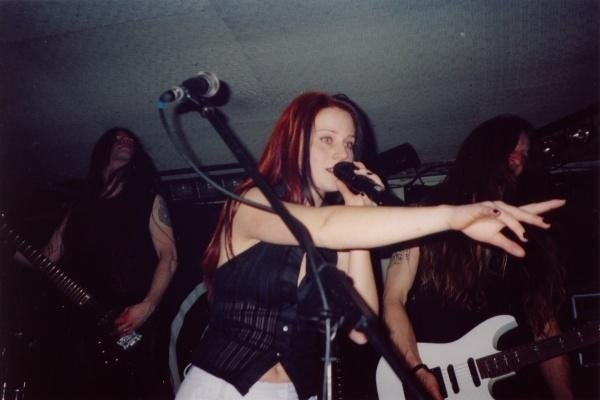
- Dünser performing in 2005

Background information
- Born: Sabine Michaela Dünser; 27 June 1977; Schaan, Liechtenstein
- Died: 8 July 2006 (aged 29) Geiselwind, Bavaria, Germany
- Genres: Gothic metal; symphonic metal
- Occupations: Singer; lyricist
- Works: God's Silence, Devil's Temptation (2003)
- Years active: 2000–2006
- Label: Napalm Records
- Formerly of: Erben der Schöpfung; Elis

Sabine Michaela Dünser (27 June 1977 – 8 July 2006) was a Liechtensteiner gothic metal and symphonic metal singer and lyricist. She was the vocalist and lyricist for Liechtenstein gothic metal band Erben der Schöpfung, and then the band Elis in Vaduz. After her death in 2006 from a cerebral haemorrhage, she was replaced as lead singer of Elis by Sandra Schleret.

== Biography ==
Dünser was born in 1977 in Schaan, Liechtenstein.

Dünser was vocalist and lyricist for Liechtenstein gothic metal band Erben der Schöpfung between 2000 and 2002. She provided the lead vocal for the 2001 album Twilight. The album's single Elis contains a poem written by Austrian expressionist poet Georg Trakl.

After misunderstandings and fights between Erben der Schöpfung members, the band split in 2002. A year later, Dünser and Pete Streit formed new band Elis in Vaduz, Liechtenstein, taking the name from the single of their former band. Dünser provided the vocals for their first album God's Silence, Devil's Temptation, released in 2004.

On 7 July 2006, Dünser suffered a cerebral haemorrhage, and died the next day in hospital, when she was aged 29.

Her death occurred when Elis was recording the studio album Griefshire with Alexander Krull in Germany. The album concept and all lyrics were written by her. Griefshire was released in Europe on 24 November 2006, in Dünser's memory. Dünser was replaced as lead singer of Elis by Austrian singer Sandra Schleret, former vocalist of Austrian metal bands Dreams of Sanity and Siegfried, who sung for the band until 2011.

== Discography ==
=== With Erben der Schöpfung ===
==== Singles ====
- Elis (2001)

==== Albums ====
- Twilight (2001)

=== With Elis ===
==== Albums ====
- God's Silence, Devil's Temptation (2003)
- Dark Clouds in a Perfect Sky (2004)
- Griefshire (2006, posthumously)
- Show Me the Way (2007, posthumously, vocals on tracks 2–4)
