= Alyce =

Alyce is a feminine given name.

Alyce or Allyce may refer to:

- Allyce Beasley (born 1954), American actress and comedienne
- Alyce Clarke (born 1939), American politician
- Alyce Cleese (born 1944), American psychotherapist, author and talk radio host, former wife of actor/comedian John Cleese
- Alyce Frank (born 1932), American landscape painter
- Alyce Fraser Denny (1896–1988), singer from British Guiana (Guyana)
- Alyce King (1915–1996), one of The King Sisters singing group
- Alyce McCormick (1899–1932), American actress
- Alyce Miller, American writer and academic
- Alyce Mills (1899–1990), American actress
- Alyce Parker (born 2000), Australian rules footballer
- Alyce Platt (born 1963), Australian actress and singer
- Alyce Rogers, American opera singer
- Alyce Spotted Bear (1945–2013), Native American educator and politician
- Alyce Thornycroft (1844–1906), English sculptor and painter
- Alyce Wood (born 1992), Australian canoeist

== See also ==
- Alice (name)
- Ellice (given name)
- Ellise Chappell (born 1992), English actress
- Ellyse Perry (born 1990), Australian female cricketer and footballer
