= Sandra Schleret =

Austrian singer

- Born: Sandra Carola Schleret; 26 June 1976 (age 50); Innsbruck, Austria
- Genres: Progressive metal, Gothic metal, symphonic metal
- Occupations: Singer
- Instruments: Vocals
- Years active: 1994–2011

Sandra Carola Schleret (born 26 June 1976) is a singer from Austria, well known for being the lead singer in bands such as Dreams of Sanity, Elis, and Soulslide. She was also the female vocalist for Austrian band Siegfried and Eyes of Eden with Polish heavy metal musician Waldemar Sorychta.

== Career ==
=== With Dreams of Sanity (1994–2002) ===
In 1994, Schleret and Martina Hornbacher replaced the former vocalists and released their first demo tape with Dreams of Sanity in May that same year.

In January 1997, they have released their first album Komödia featuring the female duo. Not long after the release, Dreams of Sanity split from Hornbacher for musical and personal differences and after a lot of vocal-auditions, they decided not to fill Hornbacher's place, leaving Schleret with a female leading role.

The band went onwards making their second album Masquerade, released in 1999, with Schleret as the lead vocalist (excluding the track "The Phantom of the Opera" which featured Tilo Wolff of Lacrimosa), and The Game in 2000.

After The Game was released, the band went through some unstable times in which some line-up changes were made and even though work on the following album began. The band disbanded in July 2002.

=== Other works ===
She has also collaborated with composers such as Waldemar Sorychta, and with bands like Samael on their 2004 album Reign of Light. She worked with Serenity on studio and live versions of the track "Fairytales" from their 2008 album Fallen Sanctuary. She worked with Beto Vazquez Infinity on the album Darkmind on the track called "Sleeping in the Shadows" in 2009.

== Discography ==
=== With Dreams of Sanity ===
- Demo (1994)
- Ein Liebeslied (Demo, 1996)
- Komödia (1997)
- Masquerade (1999)
- The Game (2000)

=== With Siegfried ===
- Fafnir demo (2000)
- Drachenherz (2001)
- Eisenwinter (2003)
- Nibelung (2009)

=== With Soulslide ===
- Dreamshade (Demo, 2003)
- Lost in You (Demo, 2004)

=== With Elis ===
- "Show Me the Way" (single, 2007)
- Catharsis (2009)

=== Guest appearances ===
- Samael – Reign of Light (2004)
- Serenity – Fallen Sanctuary (2008)
