= Ellice =

Ellice may refer to:

== Places ==
- Rural Municipality of Ellice, Manitoba, Canada
- Ellice (electoral district), a former provincial electoral division in the province of Manitoba
- Ellice River, former name of Kuunajuk, Nunavut, Canada
- Ellice Swamp, Ontario, Canada
- Fort Ellice, a Hudson's Bay Company post
- Tuvalu, formerly known as the Ellice Islands (named so after British merchant and politician Edward Ellice the Elder)

== People ==
- Ellice (surname)
- Ellice (given name)

== Other uses ==
- Ellice School, a historic schoolhouse in Millis, Massachusetts, United States, on the National Register of Historic Places
- Ellice (ship), two ships and two partial matches
- Ellice Ceñidoza-Villarosa, a character in the 2020 TV series Ang sa Iyo Ay Akin

== See also ==
- Ellis (disambiguation)
