= Elodia =

Elodia may refer to:

== People ==
- Elodia Kāne, Hawaiian musician with Raymond Kāne
- Disappearance and alleged murder of Elodia Ghinescu

== Biology ==
- Elodea, a genus of aquatic plants
- Elodia (fly), a genus of flies in the family Tachinidae.
  - Elodia parafacialis, a Chinese fly
- Eulima elodia, a species of sea snail

== Music ==
- Elodia di Herstall, an opera by Alessandro Curmi (1842)
- Elodia (album), by German duo Lacrimosa

== See also ==
- Alodia, a medieval Nubian kingdom in modern-day Sudan
- Alodia, saint and child martyr from Huesca (see Nunilo and Alodia)
