= Catharsis (Elis album) =

Studio album by Elis
- Released: 27 November 2009
- Recorded: 2008 at Mastersound Studio
- Genre: Gothic metal
- Length: 48:52
- Label: Napalm Records
- Producer: Alexander Krull

Elis chronology
Griefshire (2006)	Catharsis (2009)

Alternative cover
- Digipack edition cover

Catharsis is the fourth and final studio album by Elis, released on 27 November 2009 by Napalm Records. It is the first and only album with Sandra Schleret (ex-Dreams of Sanity, Siegfried) as their new lead singer after Sabine Dünser's death; the band released in early 2007 the MCD "Show Me The Way".

== Background ==
After touring throughout 2007 and 2008, the band announced that they had entered the studio to record their fourth studio album, the follow-up to their 2006 release, Griefshire. They spent the rest of 2008 and a part of 2009 recording the new album.

After the sudden death of Elis' original singer Sabine Dünser, the band decided to continue her musical ideas. The album was released in late 2009 on Napalm Records, being the first full release with new singer Sandra Schleret, known from Dreams of Sanity and Siegfried. It contains hard and quick tracks, but is nevertheless emotional.

== Reception ==
Professional ratings
Review scores
Source	Rating
Allmusic	3.5/5 stars
Laut.de	Favourable
Sonic Seducer	Very favourable

Allmusic was critical of "uninspired keyboard melodies using preset sounds" and a general lack of originality but found Sandra Schleret's voice to be "pretty". The Sonic Seducer magazine however delivered a review that called the album fascinating and mentioned the "authenticity of each single note".

Laut.de wrote that Sandra Schleret did not copy Dünser's style, instead she was lauded for her darker, more powerful voice on most tracks. The cover of Jennifer Rush's "I Come Undone" was found weaker than the original though.

== Track listing ==
- All songs written by Sandra Schleret (lyrics) and Pete Streit (music), except where noted.
1. "Core of Life" (04:08)
2. "Twinkling Shadow" (04:25)
3. "Warrior's Tale" (06:05) (feat. Michelle Darkness)
4. "Des Lebens Traum, des Traumes Leben" (04:06)
5. "I Come Undone" (Jennifer Rush cover) (04:25) (Morrie Elliott Brown, Ellen Shipley)
6. "Firefly" (04:25)
7. "Morning Star" (04:17) (Shipley)
8. "Das kleine Ungeheuer" (3:53) (Shipley)
9. "Mother's Fire" (04:02)
10. "Rainbow" (04:10) (Simone Dyllong, Maximilian Nascher)
11. "The Dark Bridge" (04:56)
12. "Ghost Of The Past" (Bonus on Digipack)
13. "No Hero" (Bonus on Digipack)

=== Digipack Bonus-DVD "Metal Female Voices Fest 2007" ===
1. "Tales From Heaven And Hell"
2. "Die Zeit"
3. "Show me The Way"
4. "Phoenix From The Ashes"
5. "Der letzte Tag"
6. "Lost Soul"
7. "A New Decade"
8. "Heaven And Hell"

The digipack version includes a DVD with live Sequences of the Band from the Metal Female Voices Fest 2007.

- 25 November 2009 - Finland, Spain
- 27 November 2009 - Germany, Switzerland, Austria, Benelux, Italy
- 30 November 2009 - Rest of Europe
- 15 December 2009 - USA
- 12 January 2010 - Canada

== Personnel ==
- Sandra Schleret – vocals
- Pete Streit – guitar
- Chris Gruber – guitar
- Tom Saxer – bass guitar, death growls
- Max Naescher – drums

== Production ==
- Programming by Elis; additional samples and programming by Alexander Krull
- Produced, Mixed and Mastered by Alexander Krull at Mastersound Studios in Steinheim, Germany in 2008/2009.
- Recorded by Alexander Krull, with assistance by Mathias Roderer and Thorsten Bauer.
- Cover Artwork photos by Stefan Heilemann and make up by Sylvia Hable.
