= Ellis Island (disambiguation) =

Ellis Island is a former immigrant processing station in New York Harbor.

Ellis Island may also refer to:

== Film ==
- Ellis Island (miniseries), 1984 British miniseries
- Ellis Island (1936 film), a 1936 American crime film

== Music ==
- Ellis Island: The Dream of America, a 2002 work for actors and orchestra by American composer Peter Boyer
- Ellis Island, a 2001 album by The Irish Tenors
- Ellis Island Sound, instrumental band from London, England
- Ellis Island, a 2015 song by The Corrs (White Light album)

== Novels ==
- Ellis Island (novel), 1983 historical novel by Fred Mustard Stewart

== Places ==
- Ellis Island (Missouri), an island in the Mississippi River, United States
- Ellis Island (Queensland), part of the Great Barrier Reef Marine Park, Australia
- Ellis Island Immigrant Hospital
- Ellis Island Casino & Brewery, an entertainment venue in Paradise, Nevada

== See also ==
- List of Ellis Island immigrants, notables only.
- Ellis Island Medal of Honor, American award which pays homage to the immigrant experience
- Tuvalu, formerly known as the Ellice Islands
