= Elis (band) =

Gothic metal band from Liechtenstein

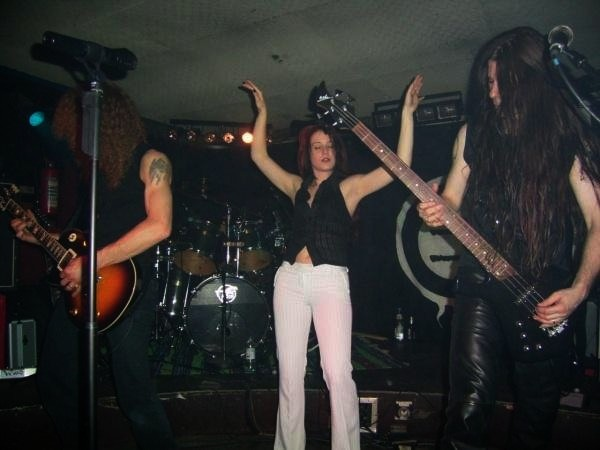
- Elis live in 2005

Background information
- Origin: Vaduz, Liechtenstein
- Genre: Gothic metal
- Years active: 2003–2012
- Label: Napalm Records
- Spinoff of: Erben der Schöpfung
- Members: Christian "Chris" Gruber; Pete Streit; Tom Saxer; Maximilian "Max" Naescher
- Past members: Sabine Dünser (deceased); Sandra Schleret; Jürgen "Big J" Broger; René Marxer; Franco "Franky" Koller; Simone Christinat

Elis was a gothic metal band from Liechtenstein, formed by Sabine Dünser and Pete Streit in 2003 after the split of Erben der Schöpfung in 2002. The band temporarily split up in February 2012 after lead singer Simone Christinat's departure. However, a month later, the band began doing a search for Christinat's replacement and the search was successful. Elis has since "disbanded" in order to form a new group called Zirkonium, with Swiss singer Kathrin Schlumpf as their lead vocalist.

== History ==
=== God's Silence, Devil's Temptation ===
Elis began their musical career under the name 'Erben der Schöpfung' in 2000. In 2001, they released their first single "Elis" as well as their debut album Twilight. The band has appeared live at the Wave Gotik Festival in Leipzig, among others, has held on to favorable positioning on the DAC-Charts, and has remained well represented in the scene's press. Germany's Orkus Magazine, for example, featured Erben der Schöpfung as their top newcomer act of the month. This choice was later more than confirmed by the publications readership, who extended the honor by choosing the band as their newcomer of 2001.

Following their split with Oliver Falk, the band re-emerged in 2003 under the new alias Elis (taken from the single/song by their former band). Produced at Mastersound Studio by Alexander Krull (Atrocity, Leaves' Eyes), God's Silence, Devil's Temptation was simultaneously released on Napalm Records with the re-release of Erben der Schöpfung's 2001 debut, Twilight.

Soon after the release of God's Silence, Devil's Temptation, Elis focused their energy on writing new material for their second offering. Between their song writing and recording duties, they found time to tour in a headlining capacity with label mates Eisheilig and The Vision Bleak. The tour took them to Germany, Switzerland, and Belgium. God's Silence, Devil's Temptation was inspired by the works of Trakl and drawing on the experience gained with Erben Der Schopfung, the newly created formation recorded immediately full-length album God's Silence, Devil's Temptation. In January 2004, the disc God's Silence, Devil's Temptation was # 1 in the charts at The Gothicworld.de. The same success has made the single 'For Such A Long Time'.

=== Dark Clouds in a Perfect Sky ===
In March 2004, they returned to the studio, under the guidance of band manager and producer Alexander Krull once more, to record the twelve new tracks featured on their second album. Released in October 2004, Dark Clouds in a Perfect Sky, showed a maturation of the band's sound. A video clip for the album's opener, "Der Letzte Tag" (translated to: The Last Day), was included with the release as well. The second CD 'Dark Clouds in a Perfect Sky' caused obvious association with the best works of Within Temptation or The Gathering.

The Dark Clouds tour took place in April 2005. Elis played in Germany, Austria and Belgium, and were supported by Visions of Atlantis and Lyriel. The band offered a preview of the new material during festival performances at the Wave-Gotik-Treffen and M'era Luna Festival. Further opportunities for the fans to experience the new album live were planned for October, as the band embarked on a European Tour with Atrocity, Leaves' Eyes, and Battlelore. This tour ended with a performance at the Metal Female Voices Fest 3. This concert wasn't just the last of this little tour, it also was the last concert with guitarist Jürgen "BigJ" Broger, who left the band amicably soon after. Elis also appeared on a television show on German television, and video appeared in the program of 'Hell's Kitchen' channel Viva!

=== Griefshire and death of Sabine Dünser ===
The third release from Elis, a concept album titled Griefshire, was planned for release in late 2006 or early 2007. The band wanted to complete a tour with Leaves' Eyes and Atrocity, but unfortunately, on 8 July 2006, Sabine died of a cerebral hemorrhage. An announcement on the band's official website a day later stated that the album Griefshire would be released in Sabine's memory. A further announcement in September announced that the band would continue with a new singer.

=== Griefshire and new female singer ===
Griefshire was released in Europe on 24 November 2006 on Napalm Records. The North American release date was 16 January 2007. On 28 December 2006 it was finally announced that the new female singer is the Austrian metal singer Sandra Schleret, former vocalist of Dreams of Sanity and Siegfried, and guest singer on some Samael albums.

After that, they started a tour that took them for the first time to Mexico (as guest stars for the Festival Oscuro event in August 2007).

In order to show how Sandra's voice would appear on the next studio album, the band released the MCD Show Me The Way, on 2 November 2007 in Europe and on 6 November 2007 in the U.S., that features Sandra Schleret on the two new versions of the song "Show Me the Way" as well as three non-album tracks from Grieshire's recording sessions, still with Sabine Dünser's voice. On 2 November 2007 a new single of 'Show Me the Way' was released on the Napalm Records label.

=== Catharsis and onward ===
In early 2008, the band posted on their official bandsite that they would be working on their 4th studio album that year. In September 2008 they went to a German Mastersound studio with producer Alex Krull with a new vocalist and recorded participated a song for the album with Michelle Darkness (End Of Green). The band performed a few live shows before entering the studio to record the new album. On 22 November 2008 it was announced that the name of the new album would be Catharsis, a title dear to Sandra Schleret due to the illnesses she went through shortly before joining Elis.

Catharsis was released on 27 November 2009 by Napalm Records. Critics for the release were from mixed to positive.

=== Departure of Sandra Schleret ===
In May 2011, the Elis web site announced that Sandra Schleret had made a decision to leave the band. The following day, the band posted that the remaining members "agreed to give it one more try, but with a fresh start." She was replaced by Simone Christinat in June 2011.

=== Christinat's departure and new project ===
In late February 2012, Simone Christinat announced to the rest of the band that she would be departing from the band, due to increased stress. A few days later, the band opted to call it quits.

In March 2012, the band announced the search for a new singer for a new project. In April 2012, it was announced that the search had been successful and new material was being written. The new singer's identity was however not revealed.

== Style ==
Elis' music style is a very particular one in gothic metal. The influences of their sound come from both symphonic metal and doom metal, as clearly defined on their releases: the songs include most of the times an orchestral part and death grunts at the same time, making it hard to identify the band's true genre.

The lyrics are another important element of Elis' music. Differently from many other gothic metal bands, whose lyrics are heavily influenced by literature, love and death, Elis' lyrics are mainly taken from life and experiences, as well as childhood (especially on the Griefshire album). Most of the song's lyrics are written in English, with two or three songs in German per full-length album and, before Sabine Dünser's death, she was the main songwriter of them. The only exceptions are (so far) "Heaven and Hell", a Black Sabbath cover; "I Come Undone", a Jennifer Rush cover; and "Ballade" and "In Einem Verlassenen Zimmer", whose lyrics are entirely taken from poems of the same (respective) names by Austrian poet Georg Trakl.

== Band members ==
=== Last-known line up ===
- Pete Streit – guitar (2003–2012)
- Tom Saxer – bass guitar, death growls (2003–2012)
- Max Näscher – drums (2004–2012)
- Chris Gruber – guitar (2006–2012)

Touring member

- Trevor – Drums (2009)

=== Former members ===
- Franco "Franky" Koller – drums (2003–2004)
- René Marxer - vocals (2004)
- Jürgen "Big J" Broger – guitar (2003–2005)
- Sabine Dünser – vocals (2003–2006; died 2006)
- Sandra Schleret - vocals (2007-2011)
- Simone Christinat - vocals (2011-2012)

== Discography ==
=== Studio albums ===
- God's Silence, Devil's Temptation (2003)
- Dark Clouds in a Perfect Sky (2004)
- Griefshire (2006)
- Catharsis (2009)

=== Singles ===
- "For Such a Long Time" (2003)
- "Der letzte Tag" (2004)
- "Show Me the Way" (2007)

=== Videos ===
- "Der letzte Tag" (2004)
- "Show Me the Way" (2009)
