= Ellis (disambiguation) =

Ellis is a surname.

Ellis may also refer to:

== Places ==
=== United States ===
- Ellis, Indiana
- Ellis, Steuben County, Indiana
- Ellis, Kansas
- Ellis, Minnesota
- Ellis, Missouri
- Ellis, Nebraska
- Ellis, Ohio
- Ellis, South Dakota
- Ellis, Wisconsin
- Ellis County, Kansas
- Ellis County, Oklahoma
- Ellis County, Texas
- Ellis Island, New York
- Ellis Township, Michigan
- Ellis River (Maine)
- Ellis River (New Hampshire)
- Camp Ellis, Fulton County, Illinois, a World War II Army Service Forces Unit Training Center and prisoner-of-war camp

=== Elsewhere ===
- Ellis Island (Queensland), Australia
- Ellis River (New Zealand)

== People ==
- Ellis (given name)

== Arts and entertainment ==
- Ellis (film), a short film
- Ellis, a band fronted by Steve Ellis
- Ellis Carver, a fictional character on the television series The Wire
- Ellis (Battle Arena Toshinden), a character in the video game series
- Ellis, a playable character in Left 4 Dead 2
- Abe Ellis (Stargate), a fictional character in the TV series Stargate Atlantis
- Ellis (TV series), a 2024 Northern Irish crime drama series

== Other uses ==
- European Laboratory for Learning and Intelligent Systems (ELLIS)
- USS Ellis (DD-154), a United States Navy destroyer that served in World War II
- The Ellis, a mid-rise residential building in Uptown Charlotte, North Carolina, United States
- Ellis Hotel, Atlanta, Georgia, United States, on the National Register of Historic Places
- The Ellis School, Pittsburgh, Pennsylvania, United States, an independent, all-girls, college-preparatory school
- Ellis Unit, a prison in Walker County, Texas

== See also ==
- Elis (disambiguation)
- Elys (disambiguation)
- Ellice (disambiguation)
- Ellis Spring, a stream in Georgia
