= Elys =

Elys may refer to:

== People ==
- Elys Dolan (fl. 21st century), British children's book writer and illustrator
- Elys Guzmán, a member of the Dominican Republic men's national basketball team in 2006
- Elys Kretelle Kukk (born 2009), Estonian rhythmic gymnast
- Elys Ventura (born 2001), New Zealand tennis player
- Cipriano Elys (1907–1984), Spanish racing cyclist
- Edmund Elys (c. 1633–1708), English clergyman, poet and writer

== Other uses ==
- Elys, Kentucky, United States, a former unincorporated community and coal town
- Elys, the Morleys Stores store in Wimbledon
- ELYS, a protein encoded in humans by the AHCTF1 gene

== See also ==
- Elis (disambiguation)
- Ellis (disambiguation)
