= Erben der Schöpfung =

Gothic metal band from Liechtenstein

- Origin: Liechtenstein
- Genres: Electro; Gothic metal
- Years active: 1998/99 – present
- Labels: Current Napalm Records former M.O.S. Records ltd.
- Members: Dina Falk; Oliver Falk; Rino Vetsch; Jens Wagner; Flo Riederer
- Past members: Sabine Dünser (†); Tom Saxer; Pete Streit; Franky Koller; Jürgen Broger
- Website: www.erben.li

Erben der Schöpfung (English: Inheritors of Creation) is a dark-gothic-metal/EBM band from Liechtenstein, founded in 1998/99 by Oliver Falk.

== History ==
In 1998–99, Oliver Falk started to think about another project called Erben der Schöpfung next to his main band WeltenBrand. He talked to Thomas Rainer of L'Âme Immortelle about it for cooperation but unfortunately he could not join because of lack of time. This made Falk starting to work on his own on the compositions for the planned album Twilight.

After a while, he was looking for a singer to complete his project and got introduced to Sabine Dünser. What was thought of as a two-man project got enlarged after letting Pete Streit playing the guitar on one of Falk's electronic/sample compositions. The blend of electronic samples, Sabine's voice and the e-guitar gave a unique blend so Pete became a bandmember.

In the year 2001, their first longplayer Twilight was released after releasing the single Elis under Falks label M.O.S. Records ltd. The single Elis contains a poem written by Austrian Expressionist poet Georg Trakl.

Following great liveperformances such as at the Wave-Gotik-Treffen in Leipzig (DE) Tom Saxer, Jürgen Broger and Fraky Koller joined the band and Alexander Krull of Leaves' Eyes and Atrocity took care of the management.

This was the beginning of the end of the band as it was formed. Several misunderstandings and fights between founder Falk, the rest of the band and the management split the band. The court was the last instance. Because of the false advice to leave his band instead of dismiss the other members and the management Oliver Falk lost the license for his entire work Twilight. But he could save the name "Erben der Schöpfung" as a brand for himself. This forced the rest of the members to choose another band name which put out to be Elis named after the first single release of Erben der Schöpfung's album Twilight. The band also remixed the song "The Witch" from Spiritual Cramp on the album from the German band "To Say Goodbye".

Following the split and the disbandment of M.O.S. Records ltd., Oliver Falk signed to Napalm Records and began to reform Erben der Schöpfung with guitarist Rino Vetsch.

In 2005, the formation was extended by singer Dina Falk (WeltenBrand) and the work for a new album began. In August 2007, the band went to the studio for recording their new work. Its release date was set around the end of 2007 or beginning of 2008, but it has been changed many times since then, because the original idea of an EP was changed to a full-length album (because of the number of songs composed for the release). The current release date for this second full-length album (titled Narben der Zeit) was mid-2009.

On 8 March 2008, the band announced on their official website that Jens Wagner and Flo Riederer had entered the band as bass player and guitar player, respectively. On 27 November 2009, the band released a limited edition of Narben der Zeit as DVD and CD box.

== Style ==
Twilight turned out to be an Electro-Gothic metal album with classical female vocals. Lyricwise Erben der Schöpfung concentrated on topics as death and ageing. As mentioned also a poem of Georg Trakl was processed. "The next album will contain more EBM-Electro elements but also there will be focused on heavier guitars.", so Falk. The Lyrics will also contain paranormal activities (such as the story to the picture of Jane Churm) and inter-human differences.

== Members ==
=== current Line-up ===
- Dina Falk – Vocals (2005–present)
- Oliver Falk – Keyboard (2000–present)
- Rino Vetsch – Guitar (2002–present)
- Jens Wagner – Bass (2008–present)
- Flo Riederer – Guitar (2008–present)

=== former Members ===
- Sabine Dünser † (Vocals, 1998–2003)
- Anja Walser (Bass)
- Tom Saxer (Guitar)
- Pete Streit (Guitar)
- Pascal Ederer (Guitar)
- André Abram (Guitar)
- Ben (Guitar)
- Franky Koller
- Jürgen Broger (Bass)
- Daniela Nipp (Bass)
- Ritchie Wenaweser (Drums)
- Franky Koller (Drums)

=== Session Members ===
- Torsten Bauer (Guitar)
- Chris Lukhaup (Bass)
- Martin Schmidt (Drums)

== Discography ==
=== Demos ===
- 2007: Demo 2007

=== Singles ===
- 2001: Elis

=== Albums ===
- 2001: Twilight (M.O.S. Records; 2003, Re-Release, Napalm Records)
- 2009: Narben der Zeit

==== Videos ====
- 2009: Jane Churm
