= Komodia =

Komodia may refer to:

- Komödia, a 1997 album by Dreams of Sanity
- Komodia (company), a technology company blamed for a security incident with Superfish software
