= Einsamkeit =

Studio album by Lacrimosa
- Released: 1992
- Genre: Dark wave
- Label: Hall of Sermon

Lacrimosa chronology
Angst (1991)	Einsamkeit (1992)	Satura (Lacrimosa album) (1993)

Professional ratings
Review scores
Source	Rating
Metal Storm	7.7/10 stars

Einsamkeit (German for Loneliness, Solitude) is the second studio album by a German dark wave band Lacrimosa. It was released in 1992.

== History ==
All music and lyrics for all songs were written by Tilo Wolff. The album was recorded in 1992 at the Sodom & Gomorra studio in Binningen, Switzerland and released on Tilo Wolff's own independent label Hall of Sermon. It is the first album which featured a full band of session musicians. The cover art was created by Stelio Diamantopoulos, who drew the cover artwork for the first album (as well as all the subsequent studio albums), and who also played the bass on this album.

== Releases ==
The album was originally released on CD and LP in Switzerland in 1992. In 2020 a new version of the title track appeared on the band's YouTube channel. Tilo Wolff published a recording of a new arrangement of the 1992 song to cheer up his fans during the COVID-19 pandemic.

== Track listing ==
All tracks are written by Tilo Wolff.

No.	Title	English title	Length
1.	"Tränen der Sehnsucht (Part I & II)"	Tears of Longing (Part I & II)	9:34
2.	"Reissende Blicke"	Raging Gazes	10:33
3.	"Einsamkeit"	Loneliness	5:07
4.	"Diener eines Geistes"	A Ghost's Servant	6:38
5.	"Loblied auf die Zweisamkeit"	An Ode for Togetherness	9:39
6.	"Bresso"		5:01

== Personnel ==
- Tilo Wolff - vocals, piano, keyboards, synthesizers, drums, music, lyrics, artwork concept
- Stelio Diamantopoulos - bass, artwork
- Philippe Alioth - keyboards, mastering
- Roland Thaler - guitars
- Eric The Phantom - violin
