= Two Witches (band) =

Finnish gothic rock band

- Origin: Tampere, Finland
- Genres: Gothic rock, darkwave
- Years active: 1987–present
- Members: Jyrki Witch; Miss Blueberry; Marko "Gravehill" Hautamäki
- Past members: Anne Nurmi; Nauku; Toby; Ari; Timo; Pave; Linde; Levänen; Iris; Marjo; Dimmu
- Website: www.twowitches.com

Two Witches is a gothic rock band from Finland, formed in 1987. As with several other late 1980s bands (like Nosferatu), Two Witches started basing the main part of their appearances and lyrics on vampiric imagery. The group was founded by Jyrki Witch and Anne Nurmi, who in 1993 left the band to start a professional relationship with Tilo Wolff and his group Lacrimosa. Their last work is the album Goodevil, published in 2014.

== See also ==
- Lacrimosa
- Music of Finland
