= Ellice (ship) =

Several vessels have been named Ellice:

- Ellice (1798 ship) was launched in Bermuda. From 1800 to her loss she was a hired transport for the government, carrying passengers and cargo between London and the Mediterranean, sailing as far as Malta. She was wrecked in November 1817.
- Ellice (1824 ship) was launched in 1824 in Sunderland as a West Indiaman. She disappeared after 28 April 1829.

== See also ==
- Edward Ellice (1813 ship) was launched in New Brunswick and sailed to England where she was re-registered. She was sold in 1822 in South America.
- Lady Hannah Ellice (1812 ship) was launched as a West Indiaman. Later, she traded more widely, including making two voyages to India under a license from the British East India Company (EIC). She survived two maritime misadventures only to suffer a final wrecking in August 1838.
