= Narben der Zeit =

2009 album by Erben der Schöpfung

Studio album by Erben der Schöpfung
- Released: November 20, 2009
- Recorded: Soulfood Music Distribution GmbH
- Genre: Electro; Gothic metal
- Label: M.O.S. Records ltd.
- Producer: Alexander Krull

Erben der Schöpfung chronology
| Twilight (2001) | Narben der Zeit (2009) |

Alternative cover
- Limited edition cover

Narben der Zeit is the second album from the band Erben der Schöpfung.

== Track listing ==
1. Frequency (5:16)
2. Jane Churm (4:54)
3. Homeless (3:57)
4. Der tote See (5:25)
5. Leaving (6:15)
6. Freeze my soul (6:15)
7. Locked (5:53)
8. Krähenauge (6:40)
9. Your lullabies (6:44)
10. Twisted (4:40)

=== Limited edition ===
==== CD 1 ====
1. Frequency (5:16)
2. Jane Churm (4:54)
3. Homeless (3:57)
4. Der Tote See (5:25)
5. Leaving (6:15)
6. Freeze My Soul (6:15)
7. Locked (5:53)
8. Maybe Tomorrow (bonus track)
9. Krähenauge (6:40)
10. Your Lullabies (6:44)
11. Twisted (4:40)

==== CD + DVD video 2 ====
1. Going on after twilight
2. Making of Narben der Zeit
3. Making of Jane Churm
4. Jane Churm (Videoclip) (04:49)

== Release ==
It was released on 20 November 2009 on the label M.O.S. Records ltd. This album is available in a Rare Special Deluxe Edition Box, including a DVD over 50 minutes, lighter, patch and three Stickers. The DVD includes: Interviews, Bandhistory, Studioreport of Narben der Zeit, Videoclip of Jane Churm, and Making of Video Jane Churm, this special will also be released with the regular jewel case edition on 27 November 2009.
