= Elis (surname) =

Elis is a surname.

== Notable people with this surname ==
- Angela Elis (born 1966), German journalist and television presenter
- Dafydd Elis-Thomas (1946–2025), Welsh politician, member of the House of Lords and a leader of Plaid Cymru
- Islwyn Ffowc Elis (1924–2004), one of Wales's most popular Welsh-language writers
- Morrie Elis (1907–1992), American bridge player
- Richard Elis (born 1975), Welsh actor
- Robert Elis (1812–1875), Welsh language poet, editor and lexicographer

== See also ==
- Elis (given name)
- Elis (disambiguation)
- Ellis, similar surname and given name
