= Griefshire =

Studio album by Elis
- Released: 24 November 2006
- Recorded: 2006
- Genre: Gothic metal
- Length: 55:09
- Label: Napalm
- Producer: Alexander Krull

Elis chronology
| Dark Clouds in a Perfect Sky (2004) | Griefshire (2006) | Catharsis (2009) |

Professional ratings
Review scores
| Source | Rating |
|---|---|
| Allmusic | 4/5 stars |

Griefshire is the third album by the gothic metal band Elis. It's their first concept album, and the last before Sabine Dünser's death. Because Sabine Dünser was the creator of the concept of Griefshire and the main songwriter of the songs on it, the other members decided, after her death, to release Griefshire in her memory.

== Concept ==
The story of the album features the following characters: The Narrator's Mother (a wise and benevolent witch-style woman that dedicated her entire life to guide people in their ways to redemption), The Narrator (the younger brother, permanently handicapped since birth, a very intelligent man that constantly deals with his inner doubts), The Narrator's Brother (the older brother, with an impressive skill to be a leader, but he corrupts all the villagers to make them follow him as a sect leader), The Narrator's Daughter (a young girl that inherited the wisdom and skills from her grandmother and was raised by her father to use her powers for good), The Brother's Wife (the wife of the older brother and the secret love for the younger, she discovers the truth about her husband but refuses to leave his side) and The Sect (the villagers, corrupted by the older brother who wanted to lead them to redemption although he could not do that).

The first track of the album, "Tales from Heaven or Hell", talks about the narrator's daughter, who, after her father's death, decides to fulfill his last will: to read his secret diary to "discover the truth about her origin", and to shed his ashes over a small unknown town. However, she is afraid that her father lied to her about everything.

The second track, "Die Stadt", describes the town as it looks like now, and then it starts talking a little about how the town used to be according to the narrator's memories.

"Show Me the Way" talks about the narrator's mother and her theory about the 3x3 notion, that, according to her, can save everyone from illnesses. Also, it tells how seekers of the truth look for her wisdom.

The fourth track, "Brothers", is the first track about the two brothers' relationship. The song says that, although the younger brother (the narrator) was physically handicapped since he was born, his older brother does not abandon him, even after their mother's premature death. The song describes the older brother as a man that "everyone follows and listens to" due to his leadership skills. Finally, it talks about an "eternal vow" that both brothers made in front of their mother's tomb, swearing that they would be together forever, and that they would follow her steps no matter what happened then.

The next part of the story includes a non-album track, featured only on the "Show Me the Way" MCD: "Salvation". It narrates how the younger brother discovered that all he always feared had already happened: his older brother had become a sect leader, and all the people in the town blindly followed him, because he promised them redemption. He wants to stop his older brother before something terrible happens, and he starts planning how to do that, and to remind him the promise they both made to her mother; this part is told in "Seit dem Anbeginn der Zeit".

The next two tracks, "Remember the Promise" and "Phoenix from the Ashes", are involved with the big discussion between the two brothers. The first, "Remember the Promise", talks about what the narrator told his brother to make him stop before it's too late, and why he could not take anyone safely to salvation; and "Phoenix from the Ashes" is the answer of the older brother, his frustration and his negative reaction to his younger brother's words.

Meanwhile, the older brother's wife discovers the truth about her husband's mistakes and what could happen if he does not stop pretending to save everyone. She wonders how long she'll be able to stand without being hurt, and all her thoughts can be listened in the next track, "How Long". When she finally has decided to leave her husband, her fears stop her, and chooses to stay with him to try to save him. But it's obviously clear that the older brother somehow influenced her final decision (maybe because they had a little daughter). Innocent Hearts talks about this decision. However, she still doubts about what she chose, and she hopes that her husband remembers how their lives together used to be before the turned into a sect leader, when everything was beauty and pureness. The track "These Days Are Gone" (the second non-album track, featured on the MCD) narrates her faith on returning to those wonderful times.

The next track's story, "Forgotten Love", takes place one year after that crucial decision. Now, the younger brother has withdrawn himself from his brother and the entire community. He spends his time at his favorite place on the hills, while he thinks about his lost love, and wondering how the situation is on the town. He recalls his lost hopes, dreams and good times; but there's nothing he can do.

"The Burning" is the climax of the story. It tells about what happened when, one day in the afternoon, while spending his time thinking at the hills, the younger brother looked at the town and discovered that the city hall (where the meetings of his brother's sect took place) was on fire. He ran as fast as he could to the city hall to try to save everyone he could, but it was too late: his brother provoked somehow a big fire, and only then the people understood that he was not a redeemer after all, and that nobody could be their redeemer. The only person that the younger brother managed to save from the flames was his brother's little daughter, whom he decided to raise as his own daughter to teach her not to make the same mistakes her father made. Everyone else (including the older brother and his wife) died, and the whole town was reduced to ashes.

Now, ten years later, after reading the entire tale on her father's diary, that young girl realized why her father showed her to use her skills only for good. Also, she understood why that dark and ruined town was a special place for her father. 'Ashes to Ashes', she read, interpreting that as some kind of calling the lost souls that died on the town back then were sending to her father and, someday, they would send her, too. However, that would not be the end of the story... and the track "A New Decade" tells it clearly.

And the final track (the third non-album track featured on the MCD), In Einem Verlassenen Zimmer, talks about the place where that young woman discovered all the truth about her origin, and especially what was about to happen after that. The song is taken from a poem of the same name by Georg Trakl.

The bonus track "Heaven and Hell" has little or nothing to do with the concept. It is simply a cover of a Black Sabbath song.

== Track listing ==
(Translations to English from German titles in brackets)

1. "Tales from Heaven or Hell" - 4:17
2. "Die Stadt" (The City) - 4:19
3. "Show Me the Way" - 4:06
4. "Brothers" - 4:23
5. "Seit dem Anbeginn der Zeit" (Since the Beginning of Time) - 5:40
6. "Remember the Promise" - 3:24
7. "Phoenix from the Ashes" - 4:19
8. "How Long" [another version on Digipack] - 4:03
9. "Innocent Hearts" - 5:11
10. "Forgotten Love" - 4:23
11. "The Burning" - 4:43
12. "A New Decade" - 3:46
13. "Heaven and Hell" (Black Sabbath cover) [Bonus on Digipack] - 4:53

== Singles ==
- "Show Me the Way" (2007)

== Personnel ==
- Sabine Dünser - vocals
- Pete Streit - guitars
- Chris Gruber - guitars
- Tom Saxer - bass, death growls
- Max Naescher - drums
- Violin on "Forgotten Love" by Judith Biedermann (Nevertheless)

Concept created by Sabine Dünser. All songs written by Sabine Dünser, except "Heaven and Hell" by Ronnie James Dio. All arrangements by Elis.
