= Echos (Lacrimosa album) =

Studio album by Lacrimosa
- Released: 27 January 2003
- Recorded: June–September 2002
- Genre: Gothic rock, classical music
- Length: 61:10
- Label: Hall Of Sermon HOS 7880
- Producer: Tilo Wolff

Lacrimosa chronology
Fassade (2001)	Echos (2003)	Lichtgestalt (2005)

Echos is the eighth studio album by Switzerland-based Gothic rock band Lacrimosa. It features classically influenced Gothic-themed rock music. The title is German for "echoes". The record was released on 27 January 2003 by Hall Of Sermon.

== Style ==
Echos begins with an orchestral overture of 13 minutes length and continues with a mix of symphonic elements and hard rock that is typical of Lacrimosa. However the entire album is oriented towards classical instruments rather than hard electric guitars. Singer Anne Nurmi's only solo track "Apart" has been compared to music by the Cocteau Twins. Generally, the album has been seen as a typical work by Lacrimosa.

== Reception ==
Professional ratings
Review scores
Source	Rating
Allmusic	4/5 stars
Laut.de	favourable
Powermetal	very favourable
Sonic Seducer	neutral

The album received positive reviews from the critics and stayed in the German charts for four weeks peaking at position 13. The single "Durch Nacht und Flut" reached position 52 in the German charts.

Allmusic lauded the subtlety of the songs while the German Laut magazine was positive about Lacrimosa following their own concept instead of being influenced by expectations from the fans. While writing a very positive review, the German Powermetal magazine still marked that producer and composer Tilo Wolff's musical concept had begun to become too abstract and demanding for a broad audience to comprehend.

== Track listing ==
No.	Title	English title	Length
1.	"Kyrie - Overture"		12:44
2.	"Durch Nacht und Flut - Suche Teil 1"	Through Night and Flood - Search Part 1	6:05
3.	"Sacrifice - Hingabe Teil 1"	Sacrifice - Devotion Part 1	9:30
4.	"Apart - Bittruf Teil 1"	Apart - Petition call Part 1	4:18
5.	"Ein Hauch von Menschlichkeit - Suche Teil 2"	A Touch of Humanity - Search Part 2	5:07
6.	"Eine Nacht in Ewigkeit - Hingabe Teil 2"	A Night in Eternity - Devotion Part 2	5:54
7.	"Malina - Bittruf Teil 2"	Malina - Petition call Part 2	4:50
8.	"Die Schreie sind verstummt – Requiem für drei Gamben und Klavier"	The Screaming has ceased – Requiem for three Viols and Piano	12:42

== Special edition ==
There is also "Special edition", released by 'Scarecrow Records' (SC03067) at the same time and only released in Mexico, it contains a bonus track, "Road to Pain" (4:21), and a slightly different Digipack which also contains a second booklet with the Spanish translation of the lyrics (except "Road to Pain").

== Personnel ==
- Cello, Violin [Gamben] – V. Sondeckis
- Choir – Rosenberg Ensemble
- Choir [Alt] – Melanie Kirschke, Uli Brandt, Ursula Ritter
- Choir [Bass] – Frederick Martin, Joachim Gebardt*
- Choir [Sopran] – Bettina Hunold, Catharina Boutari, Raphaela Mayhaus
- Choir [Tenor] – Klaus Bülow, Olaf Senkbeil, Yenz Leonhard*
- Concertmaster [Spielmann-schnyder Philharmonie] – Ludgar Hendrich
- Conductor [Deutsches Filmorchester Babelsberg] – Günter Joseck
- Conductor [Spielmann-schnyder Philharmonie] – Christopher Clayton
- Design – Tilo Wolff
- Design [Painted By] – Stelio Diamantopoulos
- Double Bass – Katharina Bunners
- Drums – Manne Uhlig, Thomas Nack
- Electric Guitar, Acoustic Guitar, Electric Bass, Acoustic Bass, Mellotron – Jay P. (3)
- Keyboards, Voice – Anne Nurmi
- Orchestra – Deutsches Filmorchester Babelsberg
- Spielmann-Schnyder Philharmonie* Performer – Lacrimosa
- Piano, Programmed By, Voice – Tilo Wolff
- Viola – Sebastian Marock
- Violin [1st] – Stefan Pintev
- Violin [2nd] – Rodrigo Reichel
- Written, composed, arranged, orchestrated, produced by Tilo Wolff
- Mastered by Herge Halvé
- Photography – Burgis Wehry
