= Lichtgestalt =

Studio album by Lacrimosa
- Released: 2 May 2005
- Recorded: 2005
- Genre: Gothic metal
- Length: 69:12
- Label: Hall of Sermon HOS 7890
- Producer: Tilo Wolff

Lacrimosa chronology
| Echos (2003) | Lichtgestalt (2005) | Sehnsucht (2009) |

Lichtgestalt is a 2005 album by German gothic rock duo Lacrimosa. The album was released on 2 May 2005 by Hall of Sermon.

== Music ==
Recorded in 2005, it consists of 9 tracks, including the two different versions of "The Party Is Over". The album has strong elements of symphonic metal. The album continues in the musical vein of Lacrimosa's previous albums, in contrast to Tilo Wolff's other musical project, Snakeskin.

The style changes between calm songs with string instruments and aggressive electric guitar tracks.

Lyrics cover Lacrimosa's by-now standard themes of love, estrangement and loneliness. A notable exception is the last individual track, "Hohelied der Liebe", a song written entirely for orchestra and choir with rock elements, and with lyrics taken from St Paul's First Epistle to the Corinthians.

== Track listing ==
All songs written, composed, arranged, orchestrated & produced by Tilo Wolff except the lyrics of "Hohelied der Liebe" taken from the Holy Bible.

| No. | Title | English title | Length |
|---|---|---|---|
| 1. | "Sapphire" | | 11:14 |
| 2. | "Kelch der Liebe" | "Chalice of Love" | 6:05 |
| 3. | "Lichtgestalt" | "Luminous Figure" | 5:18 |
| 4. | "Nachtschatten" | "Night Shadows" | 7:08 |
| 5. | "My Last Goodbye" | | 8:18 |
| 6. | "The Party Is Over" | | 5:29 |
| 7. | "Letzte Ausfahrt: Leben" | "Last Exit: Life" | 5:44 |
| 8. | "Hohelied der Liebe" | "Song of Songs of Love" | 14:30 |
| 9. | "The Party Is Over" ((piano version)) | | 5:33 |

== Charts ==
| Chart (2005) | Peak position |
|---|---|
| German Albums (Offizielle Top 100) | 30 |
| Polish Albums (ZPAV) | 21 |

== Credits ==
- Tilo Wolff – vocals, programming (1,5), piano (3), keyboards (6), trumpet (8)
- Anne Nurmi – vocals (1–3,5,7,8), keyboards
- Jan Peter Genkel (credited as Jay. P) – guitars (1–5,7,8), bass (1–6,8), acoustic guitar (6)
- Thomas Nack – drums (1)
- Thomas Rhode – oboe (1,4–6)
- Thomas Gramatzki – clarinet (1,4), flute (6)
- Philip Kreinert – bassoon (1)
- Manne Uhlig – drums (2,3,5–7)
- Andrey Zubrich – conductor (Victor Smolski Symphonic Orchestra) (2,8)
- Christopher Clayton – conductor (Spielmann-Schnyder Philharmonic) (3,5,7)
- Rüdiger Dreffein (credited as AC) – drums (4,8)
- Stefan Pintev – 1st violin (4)
- Rodrigo Reichel – 2nd violin (4)
- Thomas Oepen – viola (4)
- Boris Matchin – cello (4)
- Katharina C. Bunners – double bass (4)
- Susanne Vogel – fretless bass (5)
- Jens Arnsted (credited as Yenz Leonhardt) – bass (7)
- Birte Schultz – viola da gamba, cello (8)
- Kanemaki choir, Rosenberg ensemble with Arno Schubert, Thomas Günther and Christian Kammerschick (8)
