= Stille (Lacrimosa album) =

Studio album by Lacrimosa
- Released: 17 March 1997
- Genre: Gothic metal
- Length: 71:20
- Label: Hall of Sermon HOS 781

Lacrimosa chronology
Inferno (1995)	Stille (1997)	Elodia (1999)

Stille is the fifth studio album by German duo Lacrimosa. It features a mix of classical instruments and Gothic metal.

== Concept ==
As a concept, Stille connects to the previous release Inferno which is reflected in several tracks. The first track "Der erste Tag [The first Day]" features the recovery from a burning inferno while the last track reviews the principle of hope throughout the history of mankind. "Stolzes Herz" has been called "an ode to hope".

== Reception ==
Professional ratings
Review scores
Source	Rating
Powermetal	Very favourable
Visions	5/12

The album stayed in the German charts for three weeks, peaking at position 64 with the single "Stolzes Herz" being Lacrimosa's first song to enter the German single charts. A retrospective review in 2002 by the German Powermetal magazine praised Stille for its powerful lyrics and true emotions. In contrast, the Visions magazine marked a lack of variation in Tilo Wolff's singing and wrote that the expectations that had been raised by the pre-release single "Stolzes Herz" had not been fulfilled by the full album.

== Track listing ==
All music is composed by Tilo Wolff except where noted

No.	Title	English title	Length
1.	"Der erste Tag"	The First Day	10:11
2.	"Not Every Pain Hurts" (composed by Tilo Wolff and Anne Nurmi)		5:20
3.	"Siehst du mich im Licht?"	Do You See Me in the Light?	8:19
4.	"Deine Nähe"	Your Closeness	11:02
5.	"Stolzes Herz"	Proud heart	8:47
6.	"Mein zweites Herz"	My Second Heart	6:53
7.	"Make It End" (composed by Tilo Wolff and Anne Nurmi)		6:06
8.	"Die Strasse der Zeit"	The Road of Time	14:42
