= Elis (given name) =

Elis is a given name, used for both men and women.

== Notable men with this given name ==
- Elis Bakaj (born 1987), Albanian footballer
- Elis Bergh (1881–1954), Swedish architect and designer
- Elis Bishesari (born 2005), Swedish footballer
- Elis Chiewitz (1784–1839), Swedish musician and artist
- Elis Doksani (born 1998), Albanian professional footballer
- Elis Eriksson (1906–2006), Swedish artist
- Elis Fischer (1834–1889), Swedish business executive and lawyer
- Elis Gruffydd (1490–1552), Welsh writer
- Elis Guri (born 1983), Bulgarian Greco-Roman style wrestler of Albanian descent
- Elis Isufi (born 2000), Swiss footballer
- Elis James (born 1980), Welsh comedian
- Elis Johansson (1897–1956), Swedish runner
- Elis Manninen (1909–1997), Finnish Lutheran pastor and politician
- Elis Roberts (Elis y Cowper) (1712–1789), Welsh author
- Elis Schröderheim (1747–1795), Swedish politician
- Elis Sella (1930–1992), Finnish actor
- Elis Sipilä (1876–1958), Finnish gymnast
- Elis Strömgren (1870–1947), Swedish-Danish astronomer
- Elis Svärd (1996–2022), Swedish professional golfer
- Elis Watts (born 2002), Welsh professional footballer
- Elis Wiklund (1909–1982), Swedish cross country skier

== Notable women with this given name ==
- Elis Eiler (born 1990), Liechtensteiner footballer
- Elis Lapenmal (born 1987), Vanuatu sprinter
- Elis Ligtlee (born 1994), Dutch track cyclist
- Elis Lovrić, Croatian contemporary folk singer-songwriter and actress
- Elis Manolova (born 1996), Bulgarian-born Azerbaijani freestyle wrestler
- Elis Martin (born 1999), Scottish rugby union player
- Elis Meetua (born 1979), Estonian football player
- Elis Nemtsov (born 2002), Israeli-born Canadian professional soccer player
- Elis Özbay (born 2001), Turkish rower
- Elis Paprika (born 1980), Mexican singer-songwriter
- Elis Regina (1945–1982), Brazilian singer

== See also ==
- Elis (surname)
- Elis (disambiguation)
- Ellis, similar given name and surname
