= Sehnsucht (Lacrimosa album) =

Studio album by Lacrimosa
- Released: 8 May 2009
- Recorded: 2008
- Genre: Gothic metal
- Length: 59:48
- Label: Hall of SermonHOS 8010
- Producer: Tilo Wolff

Lacrimosa chronology
Lichtgestalt (2005)	Sehnsucht (2009)	Revolution (2012)

Sehnsucht is the tenth album by the German gothic rock duo Lacrimosa, released on 8 May 2009. Singer and producer Tilo Wolff wanted to create an album that was less conceptual and more spontaneous than the previous releases by Lacrimosa. Therefore, Sehnsucht features a great variability of musical expressions like a sarcastic track "Feuer" and the tender song "Call Me With The Voice Of Love". The planned release of a vinyl format album was cancelled shortly before the final release of Sehnsucht.

== Reception ==
Professional ratings
Review scores
Source	Rating
laut.de	favourable
Side-Line	5/6
Sonic Seducer	favourable

In a positive review the German Sonic Seducer magazine lauded the freshness of the songs as well as singer Anne Nurmi's facetted and self-confident vocals, while the Side-Line magazine did not discover much new material in the album and compared the sound of "I Lost My Star in Krasnodar" to Rammstein. However, the author awarded five out of six points. The laut.de online magazine complained about the lack of quality in Wolff's singing and about weak lyrics but at the same time made very positive statements about his skills in arranging classical elements, Hard rock and Metal.

== Track listing ==
No.	Title	English title	Length
1.	"Die Sehnsucht in mir"	The Longing in Me	8:03
2.	"Mandira Nabula"		5:17
3.	"A.u.S."	Everything in Pain	6:50
4.	"Feuer"	Fire	4:33
5.	"A Prayer for Your Heart"		5:13
6.	"I Lost My Star in Krasnodar"		5:39
7.	"Die Taube"	The Dove	7:28
8.	"Call Me with the Voice of Love"		3:36
9.	"Der tote Winkel"	The Blind Spot	5:23
10.	"Koma"	Coma	7:46

== Special edition ==
There is also a "Special edition", released at the same time, with the same tracks but re-recorded with slight variations. The special version is also the first Lacrimosa album with a full color cover (The Echoes digipak had a sepia cover).

== Charts ==
Chart (2009)	Peak position
Austria (Ö3 Austria Top 40)	68
Germany (Media Control Charts)	35
Mexico (AMPROFON)	49
Switzerland (Swiss Hitparade)	82
