= Ellis Jones =

Ellis Jones may refer to:

- Ellis Jones (actor) (born 1943), English actor and acting coach
- Ellis Jones (sociologist) (born 1970), American sociologist and author
- Ellis Jones (American football) (1921–2002), American football player
- Ellis Jones (footballer, born 2003), English footballer
- Ellis Jones (footballer, born 1900) (1900–1972), English footballer
- Ellis O. Jones, American magazine editor of Life and Good Morning
- Ellis Jones, the founder of the indie rock band Trust Fund.
