= Elodia ambulatoria =

Scientific classification
- Kingdom: Animalia
- Phylum: Arthropoda
- Class: Insecta
- Order: Diptera
- Family: Tachinidae
- Subfamily: Exoristinae
- Tribe: Goniini
- Genus: Elodia
- Species: E. ambulatoria

Binomial name
- Elodia ambulatoria (Meigen, 1824)

Synonyms
- Tachina ambulatoria Meigen, 1824; Arrhinomyia cloacellae Kramer, 1910; Tachina convexifrons Zetterstedt, 1844

Species of fly

Elodia ambulatoria is a species of tachinid fly in the genus Elodia of the family Tachinidae. It is a parasitoid of Archinemapogon yildizae.

== Distribution ==
British Isles, Czech Republic, Hungary, Lithuania, Poland, Romania, Slovakia, Ukraine, Denmark, Finland, Norway, Sweden, Andorra, Bulgaria, Italy, Austria, Belgium, France, Germany, Netherlands, Switzerland, Israel, Palestine, Mongolia, Russia, Transcaucasia, China.
