= Angst (Lacrimosa album) =

Studio album by Lacrimosa
- Released: 1991
- Genre: Dark wave
- Label: Hall of Sermon

Lacrimosa chronology
| Angst (1991) | Einsamkeit (1992) |

Professional ratings
Review scores
| Source | Rating |
|---|---|
| AllMusic | 2/5 stars |
| Metal Storm | 7.5/10 stars |

Angst (German for Anguish, Fear) is the debut album by the German dark wave band Lacrimosa. It was released in 1991.

== History ==
All music and lyrics for all songs were written by Tilo Wolff. The album was recorded from 1990 to 1991 at the Sodom & Gomorra studio in Binningen, Switzerland. Tilo Wolff founded his own independent label Hall of Sermon for album release. Over the first six months only 1000 copies were sold. The first two songs from the album - “Seele in Not” and “Requiem” - were originally released in 1990 on the Clamor demo MC, the first release of Tilo Wolff.

"Clamor" was released only in 100 copies and never re-released until in 2010 these demo versions were included on the Schattenspiel album which was dedicated to the twentieth anniversary of Lacrimosa.

The idea of cover was proposed by Tilo Wolff, source photo was made by Judith Grüning, Stelio Diamantopoulos made the cover artwork and later he became a constant author of Lacrimosa's covers.

== Releases ==
The original edition was released as a vinyl LP and consisted of six songs. The CD version was released in 1993, with many reprints in the ensuing years. The Russian edition was released in 2002 as a digipack and consisted of Angst and Einsamkeit. A limited-edition Mexican version was also released in 2002 including a second CD with four more songs: "Versiegelt glanzumströmt", "Versuchung", "Darkness" and "Copycat". Regular editions in Mexico and Argentina contained song "Diener eines Geistes (Dirus - Mix)" as a bonus track, while a Korean edition included "Promised Land" as a bonus track.

== Track listing ==
All tracks are written by Tilo Wolff.

| No. | Title | English title | Length |
|---|---|---|---|
| 1. | "Seele in Not" | Soul in Need | 9:21 |
| 2. | "Requiem" | | 9:51 |
| 3. | "Lacrima Mosa" | | 5:17 |
| 4. | "Der Ketzer" | The Heretic | 7:22 |
| 5. | "Der letzte Hilfeschrei" | The Last Cry for Help | 5:21 |
| 6. | "Tränen der Existenzlosigkeit" | Tears of Nonexistence | 10:40 |

== Personnel ==
The album was recorded by Tilo Wolff (vocals, music, lyrics, producing) with participating of Judith Grüning (female vocals in Der Ketzer) and Philippe Alioth (mastering).
