= Elodia morio =

Scientific classification
- Kingdom: Animalia
- Phylum: Arthropoda
- Class: Insecta
- Order: Diptera
- Family: Tachinidae
- Subfamily: Exoristinae
- Tribe: Goniini
- Genus: Elodia
- Species: E. morio

Binomial name
- Elodia morio (Fallén, 1820)

Synonyms
- Elodia gagatea Robineau-Desvoidy, 1863; Elodia subfasciata Aldrich, 1933; Pentamyia parva Brauer & von Berganstamm, 1889; Roeselia atricula Pandellé, 1896; Tachina morio Fallén, 1820; Tachina tragica Meigen, 1824; Westwodia atra Robineau-Desvoidy, 1863; Westwodia flavisquamis Robineau-Desvoidy, 1863

Species of fly

Elodia morio is a species of tachinid fly in the genus Elodia of the family Tachinidae. The larvae are parasitoids of Codling moth larvae.

== Distribution ==
British Isles, Czech Republic, Hungary, Latvia, Lithuania, Moldova, Poland, Romania, Slovakia, Ukraine, Denmark, Norway, Sweden, Bulgaria, Italy, Portugal, Serbia, Spain, Turkey, Austria, Belgium, France, Germany, Netherlands, Switzerland, Japan, Mongolia, Russia, China.
