= Lacrimosa (band) =

Swiss rock band

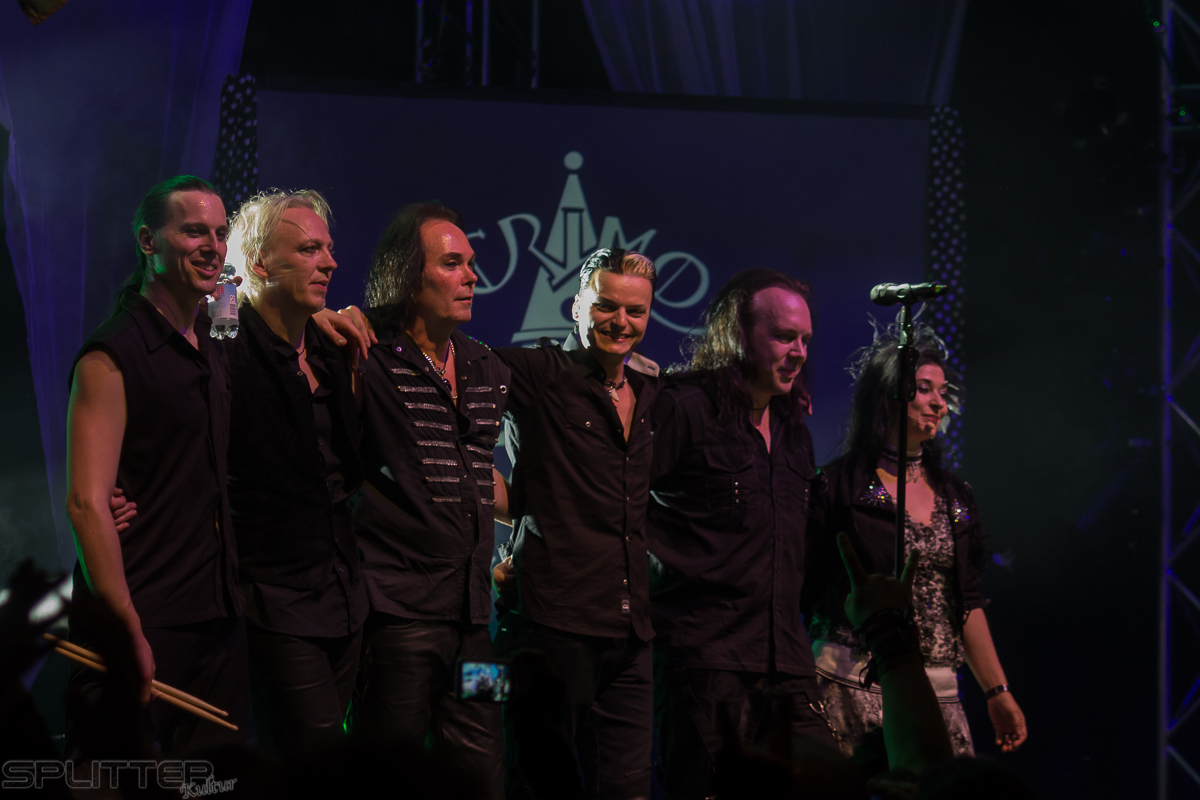
- Lacrimosa live in 2015. L-R: Julien Schmidt (drums), Jay P. (guitar), Yenz Leonhardt (bass), Tilo Wolff (vocals), Henrik Flyman (guitar), Anne Nurmi (keyboard).

Background information
- Origin: Frankfurt, Germany
- Genres: Gothic metal; gothic rock; dark wave (early)
- Years active: 1990–present
- Labels: Hall of Sermon; Nuclear Blast; East West Records; Deathwish Office
- Members: Tilo Wolff; Anne Nurmi
- Website: lacrimosa.com

Lacrimosa is a Swiss gothic metal band led by German musician Tilo Wolff, who is also the main composer, and Finn Anne Nurmi. They are currently based in Switzerland, but originally from Germany. Although sometimes associated with the Neue Deutsche Todeskunst movement, Wolff himself has distanced the band from this label. Lacrimosa are most commonly associated with the gothic metal genre.

Their musical style mixes gothic rock and heavy metal, along with violin, trumpet, and more classical instruments, although their musical development throughout the years has led to changes in instrumentation. Lacrimosa's lyrics are written almost exclusively in German, although since the 1995 album Inferno, every album has featured one or two songs in English. These songs are generally written by Anne Nurmi. Finnish has also appeared in the spoken intro to two songs ("Schakal" on Inferno and "The Turning Point" on Elodia) and on a bonus track in a limited edition release of Fassade called Vankina. Their lyrics are mainly about loneliness, sadness, darkness, despair, and love.

The band has sold more than 20,000 copies of each album in Germany, but has also gained a large fanbase in Russia, Mexico and China.

== History ==
In 1990, Tilo Wolff recorded a demo tape titled Clamor (Latin for "outcry"). Unable to secure a record deal, he founded his own label, Hall of Sermon, in 1991 and released the debut album Angst under the name Lacrimosa. A harlequin has adorned the album covers as the band's logo ever since.

In 1994, Finnish musician Anne Nurmi, formerly the keyboardist and singer of the gothic rock band Two Witches, joined Lacrimosa as a permanent member. She has since contributed her own compositions in Finnish and English.

The band's commercial breakthrough came with Elodia (1999), which reached number 12 on the German album charts. For this album, Lacrimosa collaborated with the London Symphony Orchestra at Abbey Road Studios. Subsequent albums Fassade (2001) and Echos (2003) continued the orchestral direction with the Deutsches Filmorchester Babelsberg.

In 2008, Hall of Sermon reclaimed the rights to all albums previously licensed to Nuclear Blast, restoring full independence over the back catalogue.

In March 2025, Lament reached number 7 on the German album charts, the band's highest chart position since Elodia. The subsequent world tour comprised 50 concerts across eleven countries.

On 16 September 2025, the band announced that Anne Nurmi would be unable to accompany the ongoing Lament tour due to illness. Wolff's niece Lara Florence stood in for the remaining European dates, while keyboardist Katharina von Schlotterstein of Days of Sorrow took over for the China tour. In May 2026, the band announced Anne's full recovery, and she returned to the stage at the Wave-Gotik-Treffen on 24 May 2026.

In August 2026, Lacrimosa performed their first-ever concerts with a live orchestra at the Arena Ciudad de México, marking the world premiere of this format for the band. The first concert on 22 August, attended by around 22,000 people, sold out quickly, prompting the addition of a second date on 23 August, which also sold out. The band was accompanied by the Mexican Orquesta Sincrophonia under the direction of Maestro Rodrigo Cadet, performing Tilo Wolff's original arrangements. Anne Nurmi, performing at this scale for the first time since her recovery, sang lead on "The Turning Point"; on 22 August, which was her birthday, the audience serenaded her with the traditional Mexican birthday song "Las Mañanitas". Both nights were filmed for a planned CD and DVD release. The Mexican music magazine Pólvora described the concerts as "the dream that came true" (el sueño se hizo realidad). On 18 September 2026, this was followed by the band's only orchestral concert in Europe, with choir and orchestra, at the Admiralspalast in Berlin; the band described it as a new chapter after 35 years of its history. The band was accompanied by the Philharmonie Leipzig, conducted by Michael Koehler, and by the Berlin a cappella gothic choir Stimmgewalt. As the final song before the encore, the band performed "Die Strasse der Zeit", the almost fifteen-minute closing track of Stille (1997), live for the first time. The concert, in front of about 1,700 people, was sold out.

== Style and themes ==
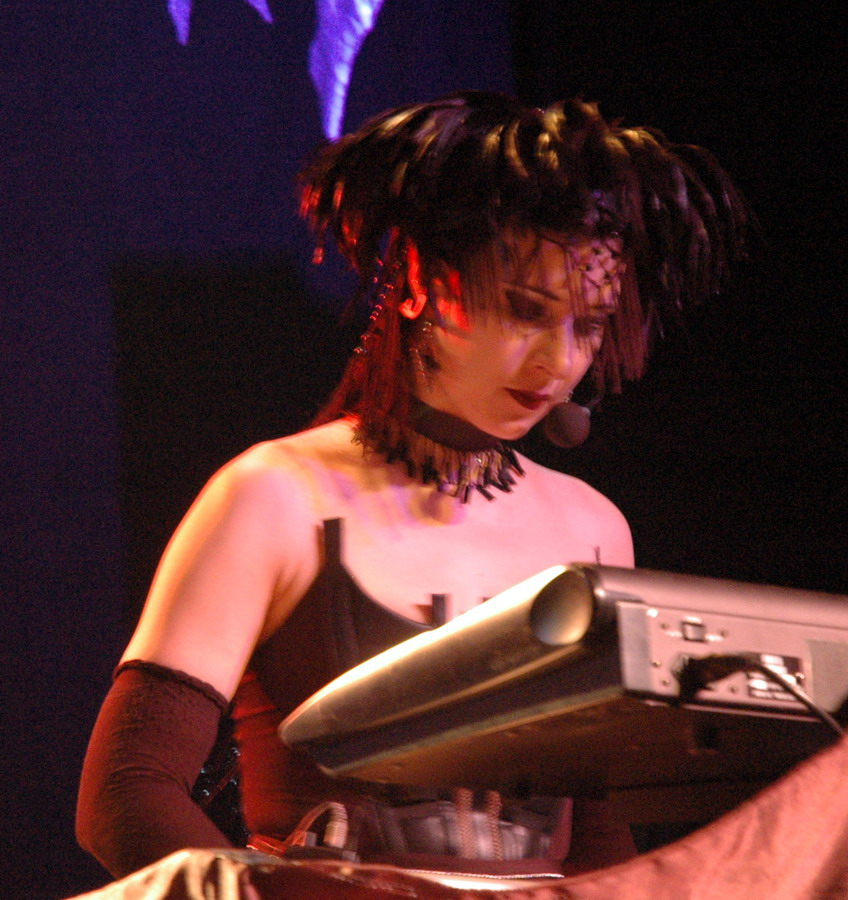
Anne Nurmi

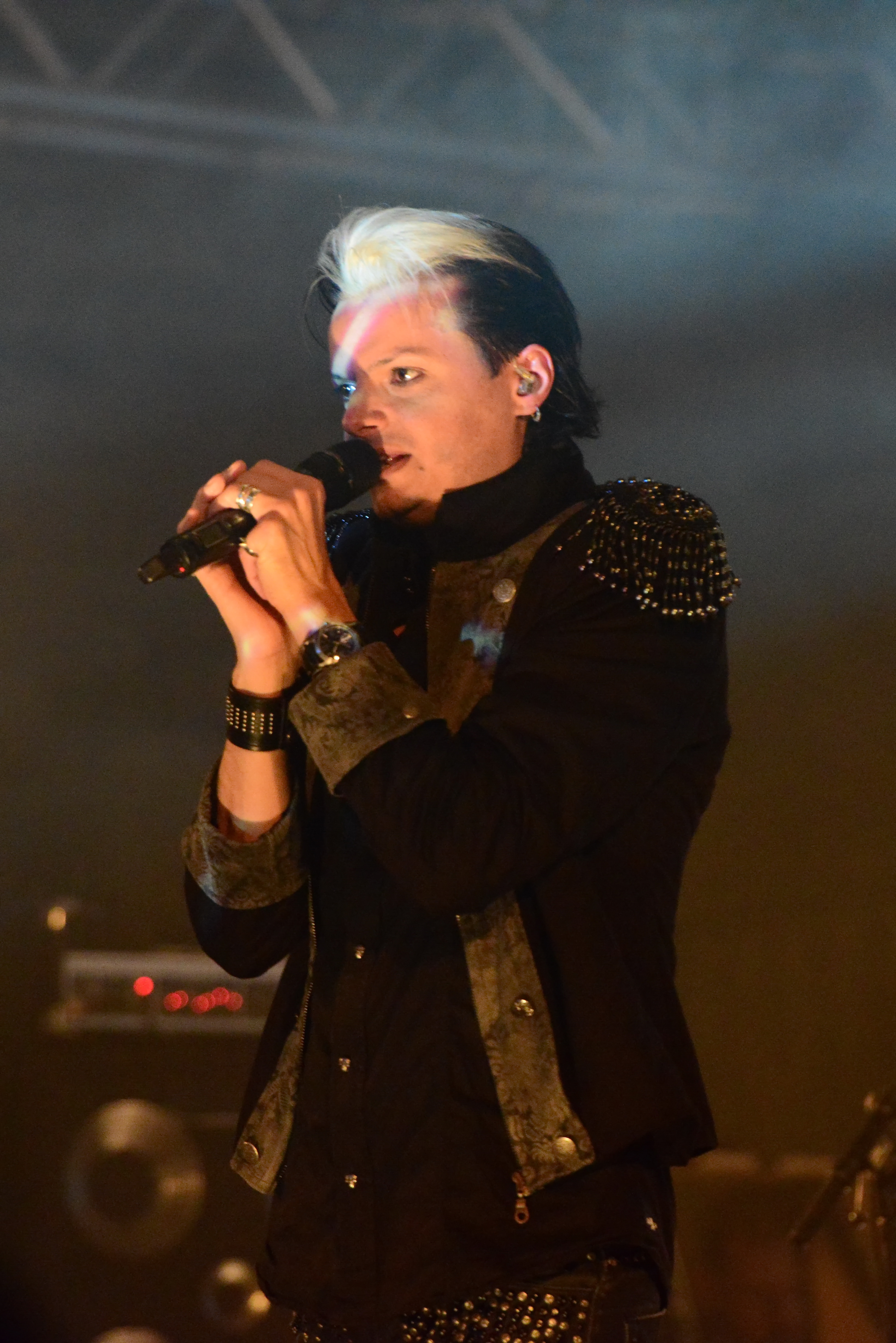
Tilo Wolff

Lacrimosa's first album, Angst, is slow and minimal music, dominated by keyboards and voice. This early period explores fear, helplessness, loneliness, non-existence, unattainability, the illusionary nature of love, and death. The same themes can be found on the next three albums, Einsamkeit, Satura, and Inferno. Musically, this period is characterised by the introduction of electric guitars and basses, with more rock elements being added.

Stille was the beginning of their metal style. Heavy guitars and bombastic arrangements for classical instruments dominate the music in the style of symphonic metal. Thematically, Stille features several uplifting songs. "Stolzes Herz" ("Proud heart") and "Die Strasse der Zeit" ("The Lane of Time") praise individual and cultural strength. "Die Strasse der Zeit" describes a journey backwards through a history of war, greed, and stupidity, until the protagonist finds solace in ancient Greek culture.

The next album, Elodia, reduced the metal-style guitars and increases the symphonic, classical arrangements, this time recorded in part by the London Symphony Orchestra. Presented as a play in three parts, Elodia revolves around the theme of love. The gothic element is still present and the themes of loss and death feature prominently in the latter half, but it ends with an affirmation of hope.

Fassade features a variety of musical visions, from the metal sound of "Liebesspiel" ("Love Game") to flowing keyboards of "Senses", and the symphonic interplay between guitars and orchestra on "Fassade". The latter, a piece in three movements arranged on the album as tracks 1, 5, and 8, explores a critique of modern society. It ends with an affirmation of individuality and the protagonist's retreat from society.

In Echos, guitars and other rock elements appear less often, whereas classical instruments feature more prominently. The orchestral arrangements move away from standard symphonic arrangements often found in contemporary metal music, as in the album's first track, "Kyrie - Overture". Echos also shows influence from electronic and industrial music, as in the song "Ein Hauch von Menschlichkeit" ("A Touch of Humanity"). This album is more personal and quieter than those before it. It continues to explore love with gothic twists.

Lacrimosa's ninth album, Lichtgestalt, retains the classical elements, but rock elements begin to resurface. The first track, "Sapphire", begins as a slow, classical song but halfway moves into a metal section; the pace of the song increases, a heavy guitar backing takes over, and Wolff switches from singing into a high-pitched death grunt for a few minutes. The remaining songs display a similar mix of styles to previous albums, with some upbeat songs, a song written and sung in English mainly by Anne Nurmi, and some slower-paced, sadder pieces.

In 2005, Lichtgestalten was released, containing a new electronic version of the song "Lichtgestalt", produced by Tilo for his solo project, Snakeskin.

In 2006, a DVD called Musikkurzfilme was released, which contained all the video clips that Lacrimosa shot throughout their career, including the video for "Lichtgestalt".

Sehnsucht was released in 2009. Wolff wanted to create an album that was less conceptual and more spontaneous than the previous releases, so Sehnsucht features a variety of musical expressions.

In 2008, Lacrimosa's label Hall of Sermon reclaimed the rights to all of the band's Nuclear Blast releases. In March 2008, Lacrimosa started working on their next studio album, entitled "Sehnsucht", which was released on 8 May 2009.

Their eleventh studio album was released in September 2012, called Revolution. The first song on this release was written in 2009 while they were touring in China.

Hoffnung (2015) marked a return to a more balanced sound, combining the heavier elements of Revolution with the orchestral textures of earlier works.

Testimonium (2017) was conceived as a requiem in four acts, paying tribute to musicians who died in 2016, among them David Bowie and Prince. The album alternates between contemplative orchestral passages and heavy metal sections, with liturgical and elegiac texts.

Leidenschaft (2021) and Lament (2025) form the final two parts of a stylistic trilogy that began with Testimonium. Leidenschaft pairs electronic textures with symphonic arrangements, while Lament synthesises the orchestral and metal elements into what critics described as one of the band's most cohesive works, debuting at number 7 on the German charts.

== Reception and significance ==
Since their inception, Lacrimosa have operated independently through Wolff's own label Hall of Sermon, making them one of the longest-running self-released acts in the gothic metal scene. Their chart history in Germany spans from Elodia (number 12, 1999) to Lament (number 7, 2025).

The band enjoys particular popularity in Latin America and China, where they are one of the few German-language acts to regularly play sold-out concerts. They have undertaken multiple tours through Mexico, Chile, Argentina and Peru, and the 2007 live album Lichtjahre includes concert recordings from Mexico among thirteen countries. The Mexican edition of Echos (2003) featured a Spanish-language version of the song Durch Nacht und Flut as a tribute to the Latin American fanbase.

A distinguishing feature of Lacrimosa is their collaboration with classical orchestras, including the London Symphony Orchestra for Elodia and the Deutsches Filmorchester Babelsberg for Fassade and Echos. This fusion of metal with orchestral arrangements and liturgical texts has established the band in a distinctive musical niche.

== Members ==
Band

- Tilo Wolff – vocals, programming, piano, keyboards, music production, arrangements (1990–present)
- Anne Nurmi – vocals, keyboards (1993–present)

Live musicians

- Jay P. (Jan-Peter Genkel) – guitar (1996–present)
- Yenz Leonhardt (Jens Arnsted) – bass (2001–present)
- Henrik Flyman – guitar (2009–present)
- Julien Schmidt – drums (2013–present)

Former live musicians

- Gottfried Koch – guitar
- Sascha Gerbig – guitar
- Rüdiger "AC" Dreffein – drums
- Stefan Schwarzmann – drums

== Discography ==
All albums and DVDs were published by Tilo Wolff's own label, Hall of Sermon.

=== Albums ===
Year	Title	Peak positions				
Year	Title	GER	AUT	MEX	POL	SWI
1991	Angst	–	–	–	–	–
1992	Einsamkeit	–	–	–	–	–
1993	Satura	–	–	–	–	–
1995	Inferno	81	–	–	–	–
1997	Stille	64	–	–	–	–
1999	Elodia	12	–	–	–	–
2001	Fassade	20	–	–	31	–
2003	Echos	13	–	–	–	–
2005	Lichtgestalt	30	–	–	21	–
2009	Sehnsucht	35	68	49	–	82
2012	Revolution	35	–	–	–	–
2015	Hoffnung	28	–	–	–	–
2017	Testimonium	32	–	–	–	–
2021	Leidenschaft	26	–	–	–	–
2025	Lament	7	–	–	–	–

=== Live albums ===
Year	Title	Peak positions	
Year	Title	GER	MEX
1998	Live (2 CD)	–	–
2007	Lichtjahre (2 CD)	70	64
2014	Live In Mexico City (2 CD)	58	–

=== Compilation albums ===
Year	Title	Peak positions	
Year	Title	GER	MEX
2002	Vintage Classix (7 LPs)	–	
2010	Schattenspiel	51	51
2019	Zeitreise	59	

=== Singles ===
Year	Title	Album	Peak positions
Year	Title	Album	GER
1994	"Schakal" (Jackal)	Inferno	–
1996	"Stolzes Herz" (Proud Heart)	Stille	-
1999	"Alleine zu zweit" (Together Alone)	Elodia	52
2001	"Der Morgen danach" (The Morning After)	Fassade	50
2002	"Durch Nacht und Flut" (Through Night and Flood)	Echos	52
2002	"Durch Nacht und Flut" (Special Edition) (Through Night and Flood)	Echos	52
2005	"The Party is Over"	Lichtgestalt	–
2009	"I Lost my Star"	Sehnsucht	–
2009	"Feuer" (Fire)	Sehnsucht	–
2009	"Mandira Nabula"	Sehnsucht	–

=== Demos and extended plays ===
Year	Title	Type
1990	"Clamor"	2-track demo tape
1993	Alles Lüge ("All Lies")	EP
2005	Lichtgestalten ("Luminous Beings")	EP
2010	"Sellador"	Club promo
2010	"Untitled"	Club promo
2013	Morning Glory	EP
2013	Heute Nacht ("Tonight")	EP

== Videography ==
=== VHS ===
Year	Title
1995	The Clips 1993-1995
1997	The Silent Clips

=== DVD ===
Year	Title
2000	The Live History
2005	Musikkurzfilme (Short Music Films)
2007	Lichtjahre (Lightyears)
2015	Live in Mexico City
