= Ellis Jones (footballer, born 1900) =

English footballer

Personal information
- Full name: Ellis Jones
- Date of birth: 5 April 1900
- Place of birth: Spennymoor, England
- Date of death: 1979 (aged 83–84)
- Position: Inside forward

Senior career*
Years	Team	Apps	(Gls)
1921–1922	Stanley United		
1922–1923	Willington		
1923–1924	Crook Town		
1924–1925	Spennymoor United		
1925–1926	Hull City	8	(1)
1926–1927	Annfield Plain		
1927–1929	Oldham Athletic	7	(3)
1929–1930	Workington		
1930–1931	Spennymoor United		
1931	Crook Town		
1932	Blackhall Colliery Welfare		
Total		15	(4)
- * Club domestic league appearances and goals

Ellis Jones (5 April 1900 – 1972) was an English footballer who played in the Football League for Hull City and Oldham Athletic.
