= Elodia (fly) =

Scientific classification
- Kingdom: Animalia
- Phylum: Arthropoda
- Class: Insecta
- Order: Diptera
- Family: Tachinidae
- Subfamily: Exoristinae
- Tribe: Goniini
- Genus: Elodia; Robineau-Desvoidy, 1863

Type species
- Elodia gagatea Robineau-Desvoidy, 1863

Synonyms
- Pentamyia Brauer & von Berganstamm, 1889; Pentamyia Brauer & von Berganstamm, 1893; Westwodia Robineau-Desvoidy, 1863

Genus of flies

Elodia is a genus of flies in the family Tachinidae.

== Species ==
- Elodia adiscalis Mesnil, 1970
- Elodia ambulatoria (Meigen, 1824)
- Elodia atra Gardner, 1940
- Elodia atricans (Herting, 1975)
- Elodia flavipalpis Aldrich, 1933
- Elodia morio (Fallén, 1820)
- Elodia parafacialis (Chao & Zhou, 1992)
