= Alyce McCormick =

American actress

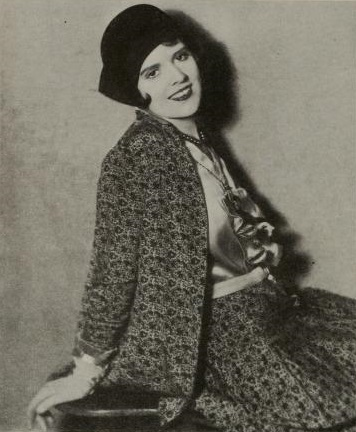
- Born: 1899; Chicago, Illinois, U.S.
- Died: January 5, 1932 (aged 32–33); Hollywood, California, U.S.
- Occupations: Charity worker, actress
- Spouse: Caryl H. Strauser (1918–1918, his death)

Alyce McCormick (1899 – January 5, 1932) was an American actress and a leader in the Volunteers of America (VOA).

== Early years ==
McCormick was born in Chicago in 1899 and was the daughter of Mr. and Mrs. F. A. McCormick. The family moved to Omaha when she was six or seven years old. Her father was a minister who was head of operations of the (VOA) for four states, and Maud Ballington Booth (co-founder of the group) was her godmother. In 1923, she was designated the most beautiful girl in Nebraska in a contest, which led to her going to New York City to participate in a national beauty contest. She finished as runner-up in the national competition, which was held in conjunction with the Spring Fashion Show of the National Milliners' Association.

== Career ==
Before McCormick became an entertainer, she was the Omaha relief secretary for the Volunteers of America. She began helping with missionary work when she was four years old, and as she matured she took on more responsibilities. She sang in prisons in North Carolina, New Jersey, Illinois, Nebraska, Kansas, and California. She preached and conducted testimony meetings. She ministered to needy people, and she kept books for the organization.

In 1923, McCormick began working as a showgirl at the Winter Garden Theatre on Broadway, debuting in The Dancing Girl. Three weeks later, she was shifted from that role to a part in Betsy Ross; after that she was one of six young women selected from 300 actresses for a part in Bal Tabourin. Following that third show, a Broadway producer offered her "three months' strenuous training under the ablest of instructors and at the end of that time to star her in one of the famous annual revues". She declined that offer and returned to Omaha to resume her work with VOA.

McCormick also acted in films, including Bad Girl, Frankenstein, and The Spirit of Notre Dame.

== Libel cases ==
A case of mistaken identity led to McCormick's involvement in 44 libel suits after a Pennsylvania divorce case in 1925 identified a woman named Alice McCormick as co-respondent, and that name was included in a wire-service story about the divorce. An employee at the New York Mirror newspaper, thinking that the alleged co-respondent was the actress, put a file photograph of Alyce McCormick with a story about the divorce suit in the newspaper's December 1, 1925, issue. Following that publication, three newspaper syndicates distributed the erroneous pairing of photograph and story to their clients across the United States, indicating that the actress was the co-respondent in the divorce suit. On March 19, 1926, the suits were settled out of court, with terms of the settlement "dictated personally" by the actress.

== Death ==
McCormick married Caryl H. Strauser in St. Louis on February 26, 1918. She filed for divorce a few months after the marriage, but Strauser tried to shoot her and then killed himself before the case was heard in court.

On January 5, 1932, McCormick died of pneumonia in Hollywood.
