= Ellice School =

- U.S. National Register of Historic Places
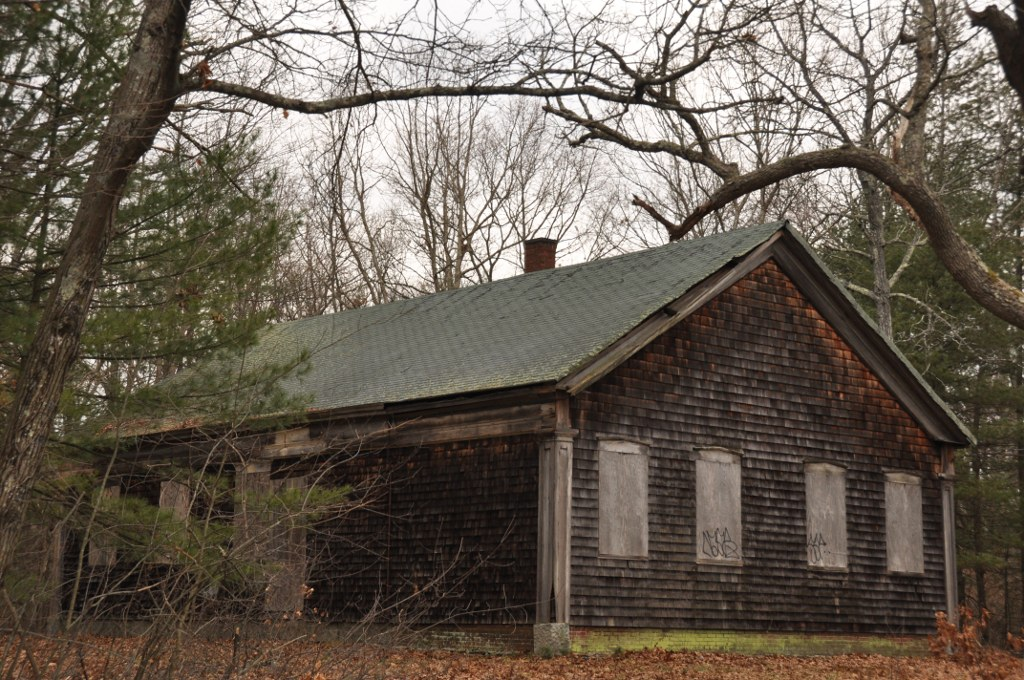

- Location within Massachusetts Location within the United States
- Location: 185 Pleasant Street, Millis, Massachusetts
- Coordinates: 42°08′43″N 71°21′30″W
- Architectural style: Greek Revival
- NRHP reference No.: 10000785
- Added to NRHP: September 24, 2010

The Ellice School is a historic two-room schoolhouse at 185 Pleasant Street in Millis, Massachusetts. The single story wood frame Greek Revival building was constructed c. 1849, when Millis was still part of Medway. It is sheathed in wood shingles, with wood trim, including corner pilasters. Its gable roof is clad in asphalt shingles. The building served as a public school until 1931. It was used during the Great Depression and the Second World War for community activities, but has stood vacant since then. It is the only remaining district school building in Millis.

The building was added to the National Register of Historic Places in 2010.

== See also ==
- National Register of Historic Places listings in Norfolk County, Massachusetts
