= AHCTF1 =

Protein-coding gene in humans

Available structures
PDB	Ortholog search: PDBe RCSB
PDB	List of PDB id codes 4I0O

Identifiers
- Aliases: AHCTF1, ELYS, MST108, TMBS62, MSTP108, AT-hook containing transcription factor 1
- External IDs: OMIM: 610853; MGI: 1915033; HomoloGene: 9142; GeneCards: AHCTF1; OMA:AHCTF1 - orthologs

Gene location (Human)
Chr.	Chromosome 1 (human)
Band	1q44	Start	246,839,098 bp
Band	1q44	End	246,931,948 bp

Gene location (Mouse)
Chr.	Chromosome 1 (mouse)
Band	1 H4|1 83.62 cM	Start	179,572,459 bp
Band	1 H4|1 83.62 cM	End	179,631,245 bp
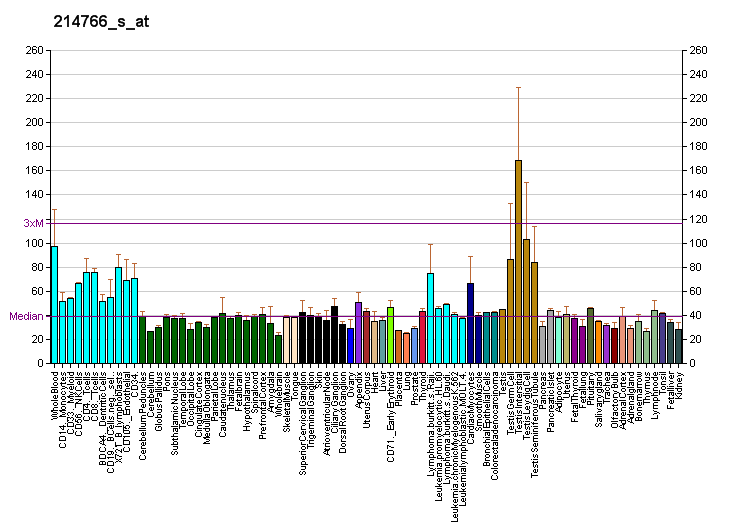
RNA expression pattern
Bgee	Human / Mouse (ortholog); Top expressed in: endothelial cell; Achilles tendon; secondary oocyte; sperm; ventricular zone; Brodmann area 23; testicle; internal globus pallidus; left testis; middle temporal gyrus / Top expressed in: tail of embryo; spermatocyte; spermatid; genital tubercle; epiblast; seminiferous tubule; zygote; secondary oocyte; otic placode; otic vesicle; More reference expression data
BioGPS	More reference expression data
Gene ontology
Molecular function	DNA binding; DNA-binding transcription factor activity; DNA-binding transcription factor activity, RNA polymerase II-specific
Cellular component	cytoplasm; cytosol; nuclear membrane; nuclear periphery; nuclear matrix; nuclear pore; nucleoplasm; chromosome; nuclear pore outer ring; chromatin; extracellular exosome; chromosome, centromeric region; nucleus; kinetochore; nuclear envelope
Biological process	mRNA transport; nuclear pore complex assembly; regulation of transcription, DNA-templated; cytokinesis; cell division; protein transport; cell cycle; sister chromatid cohesion; transport; regulation of transcription by RNA polymerase II; regulation of cytokinesis
Sources:Amigo / QuickGO
Orthologs
Species	Human	Mouse
Entrez	25909	226747
Ensembl	ENSG00000153207	ENSMUSG00000026491
UniProt	Q8WYP5	Q8CJF7
RefSeq (mRNA)	NM_015446; NM_001323342; NM_001323343; NM_175865	NM_026375
RefSeq (protein)	NP_001310271; NP_001310272; NP_056261	NP_080651
Location (UCSC)	Chr 1: 246.84 – 246.93 Mb	Chr 1: 179.57 – 179.63 Mb
PubMed search
- Wikidata
View/Edit Human	View/Edit Mouse

Protein ELYS is a protein that in humans is encoded by the AHCTF1 gene.

== See also ==
- AT-hook
