= Elodia (album) =

Studio album by Lacrimosa
- Released: 6 July 1999
- Recorded: Abbey Road Studios; Impuls Tonstudios, Hamburg
- Genre: Gothic metal
- Length: 57:57
- Label: Hall of Sermon HOS 7820
- Producer: Tilo Wolff

Lacrimosa chronology
Stille (1997)	Elodia (1999)	Fassade (2001)

Elodia is the sixth studio album by German duet Lacrimosa. It was released on 6 July 1999 via Hall of Sermon label.

== Background ==
Elodia is a concept album and a rock opera, divided into three acts. The first act describes a love that is slowly being overwhelmed; the second act describes the act of separation itself, while the third act begins with a requiem, "Sanctus", before ending on a note of hope.

Elodia was an important point in the development of Lacrimosa's music into more classical areas, with the London Symphony Orchestra, the Rosenberg Ensemble and the Hamburg State Opera contributing to the orchestral side. "Sanctus" is a particular example of this, as it is based on the Christian liturgy of the same name, and dominated by the choral vocals of the Rosenberg Ensemble. It is not entirely an orchestral work, as it includes a section of Tilo Wolff's vocals and a guitar solo; it did, however, pave the way for the track "Kyrie" on Lacrimosa's eighth album Echos, which was entirely a classical work.

The song "The Turning Point" starts with Anne Nurmi saying a small poem in Finnish. The poem is "Poutaiset pilvet haihtuvat. Katoan nopeasti tuulten mukana, kuin tämä uni, jossa en enää sinua tavoita", and roughly translates to "The white clouds are fading. I disappear quickly with the winds, as this dream, in which I no longer reach you".

== Reception ==
Professional ratings
Review scores
Source	Rating
Terrorverlag	10/10

The German Terrorverlag magazine wrote a positive review that lauded the sentimental lyrics and Anne Nurmi's expressive vocals. Especially "Turning Point" is seen as a review of Nurmi's inner self. The author concluded that the album was definitely a great step in the band's evolution and awarded the album ten out of ten points.

Elodia stayed in the German album charts for ten weeks, peaking at position 12.

== Track listing ==
All tracks are written by Tilo Wolff except where noted

1st Act
No.	Title	English title	Length
1.	"Am Ende der Stille"	At the End of Silence	8:08
2.	"Alleine zu zweit"	Alone Together	4:16
3.	"Halt mich"	Hold Me	4:00
4.	"The Turning Point" (composed by Wolff, Anne Nurmi)		5:00

2nd Act
No.	Title	English title	Length
1.	"Ich verlasse heut' Dein Herz"	I Take Leave of Your Heart Today	8:31
2.	"Dich zu töten fiel mir schwer"	Killing You Was Hard For Me	8:00

3rd Act
No.	Title	English title	Length
1.	"Sanctus"		14:13
2.	"Am Ende stehen wir zwei"	At The End There Are The Two Of Us	5:47

© & ℗ 1999 Hall Of Sermon GmbH.

== Personnel ==
- Tilo Wolff – Arranger, Producer, vocals, keyboards
- Anne Nurmi – vocals, keyboards
- Jay P. – lead guitar, bass
- Sascha Gerbig – rhythm guitar
- Mr AC (Rüdiger Dreffein) – drums
- Thomas Gramatzki – clarinet, flute
- Anja-Christine Hitzer – celli
- Gottfried Koch – acoustic guitar
- Orchestral parts performed by The London Symphony Orchestra conducting by David Snell
