= Elodia parafacialis =

Scientific classification
- Kingdom: Animalia
- Phylum: Arthropoda
- Class: Insecta
- Order: Diptera
- Family: Tachinidae
- Subfamily: Exoristinae
- Tribe: Goniini
- Genus: Elodia
- Species: E. parafacialis

Binomial name
- Elodia parafacialis (Chao & Zhou, 1992)

Synonyms
- Hebia parafacialis Chao & Zhou, 1992

Species of fly

Elodia parafacialis is a species of tachinid fly in the genus Elodia of the family Tachinidae.

== Distribution ==
China.
