= Ellis Meng =

American roboticist (born 2000)

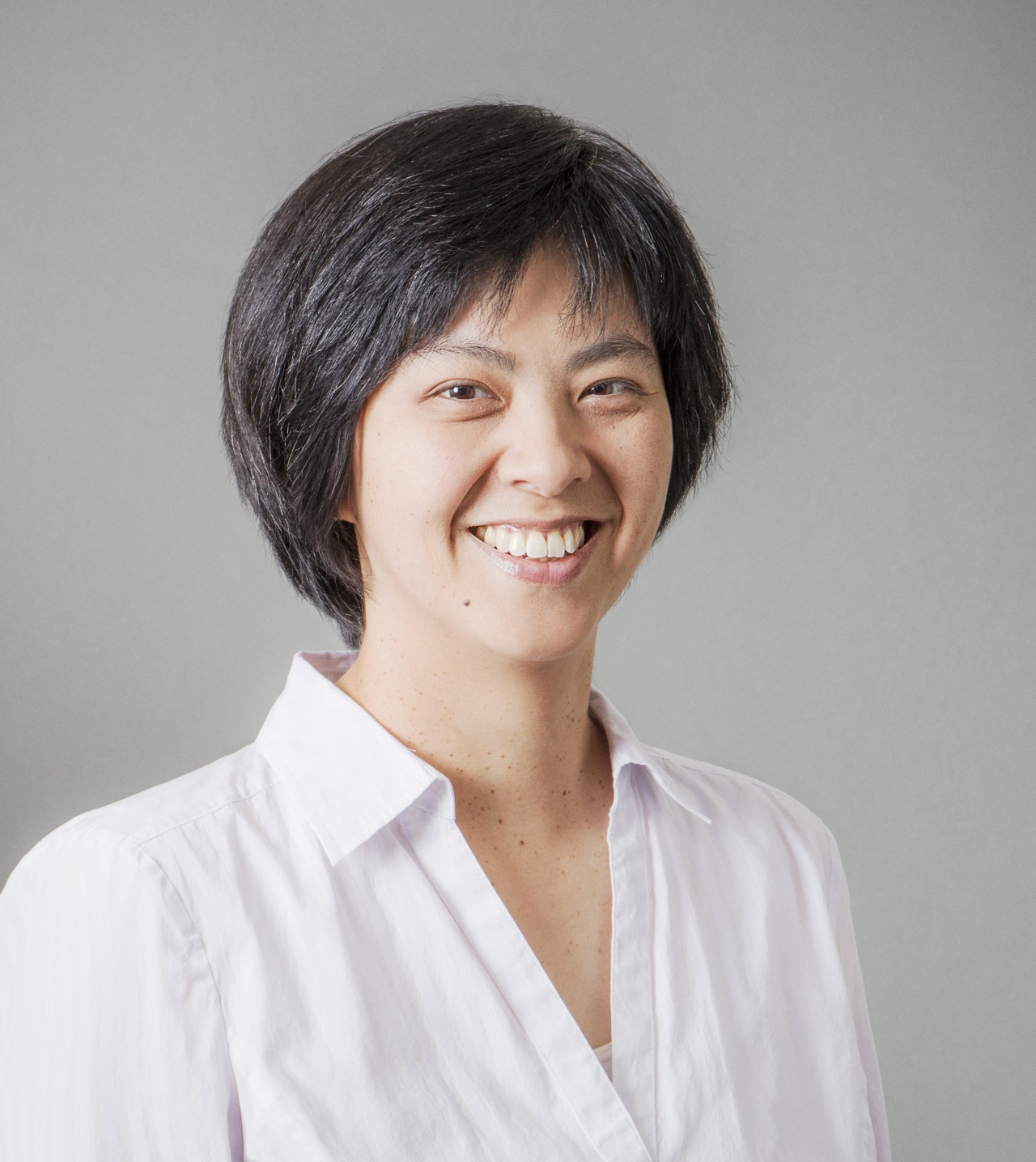
- Education: California Institute of Technology
- Scientific career
- Fields: Microtechnology; Nanotechnology; Biomedical Engineering
- Workplaces: University of Southern California; USC Biomedical Microsystems Laboratory

Ellis Meng is the Shelly and Ofer Nemirovsky Chair of Convergent Biosciences and Professor of Biomedical Engineering and Electrical and Computer Engineering in the Viterbi School of Engineering at the University of Southern California, where she also serves as the Vice Dean of Technology Innovation and Entrepreneurship. Meng is highly decorated in the development of novel micro- and nanotechnologies for biomedical applications. In 2009, Meng was named on MIT Technology Review's "Innovators Under 35" List for her work on micropumps that deliver drugs preventing blindness, and she was listed on the 40 Under 40 List of the Medical Device and Diagnostic Industry (MDDI) in 2012.

== Life and education ==
Meng received her B.S. in engineering and applied science as well as her M.S. and Ph.D. degrees in electrical engineering from the California Institute of Technology in 1997, 1998, and 2003, respectively.

== Career ==
Upon completing her Ph.D. in 2003 Meng joined the USC family. She was previously Dwight C. and Hildagarde E. Baum Chair of the Department of Biomedical Engineering from 2015 to 2018 and an inaugural holder of the Gabilan Distinguished Professorship in Science and Engineering from 2016 to 2019.

=== Research ===
Meng leads the Biomedical Microsystems Laboratory at USC that focuses on developing novel micro- and nanotechnologies for biomedical applications. Specifically, the research lab is interested in the integration of multiple modalities (e.g. electrical, mechanical, and chemical) in miniaturized devices measuring no more than a few millimeters for use in fundamental scientific research, biomedical diagnostics, and therapy.

==== Start-ups ====
Meng's research and collaborations led to the launch of USC startup, Senseer. Senseer uses self-aware sensing devices to greatly improve a pediatric condition, hydrocephalus, that causes excessive fluid in the brain. She also co-founded the Polymer Implantable Electrode (PIE) Foundry, which is funded by the NIH BRAIN Initiative. This Foundry is dedicated to developing polymer microelectrode arrays (MEA) for chronic animal experiments that provide a new technological approach for neural recording and stimulation.

=== Awards ===
Meng has received numerous distinguished awards throughout the years, and was recently awarded the Shelly and Ofer Nemirovsky Chair in Convergent Biosciences at University of Southern California. In 2019, she was awarded the IEEE Sensors Council Technical Achievement Award in Sensors. Her research has culminated in a number of outstanding achievements, including in 2015 the Orange County Engineering Council Distinguished Engineering Merit Award, in 2014 3rd Place student paper award at IEEE EMBS Conference, best paper at the 15th International Conference on Solid-State Sensors, Actuators, and Microsystems (Transducers 2009), and best paper in 2006 at Micro Total Analysis Systems Conference.

As a faculty member, she has earned numerous awards, including an NSF CAREER Award, the Viterbi School of Engineering Early Career Chair, and the Wallace H. Coulter Foundation Early Career Award. In 2016 she became a USC Women in Science and Engineering Program Gabilan Distinguished Professorship in Science and Engineering.

=== Professional memberships ===
Meng has been named a fellow at a number of societies, most recently of which was in 2018, where she was named Fellow of the National Academy of Inventors. In 2017, she was named Fellow of Biomedical Engineering Society, as well as Fellow of the American Society of Mechanical Engineers. She was named Fellow of the Institute of Electrical and Electronics Engineers in 2016 for contributions to biomedical microelectromechanical systems. In 2014, for outstanding research and translational contributions to the field of biomedical microdevices and for the education and mentoring of young engineers, she was named a fellow of the American Institute for Medical and Biological Engineering.

=== Outreach ===
Meng participates in a number of outreach opportunities, and was awarded the 2016 USC Faculty Mentoring Faculty Award, the 2013 USC Mellon Mentoring Culture of Mentoring Award,
