= Alyce Fraser Denny =

British Guianese singer

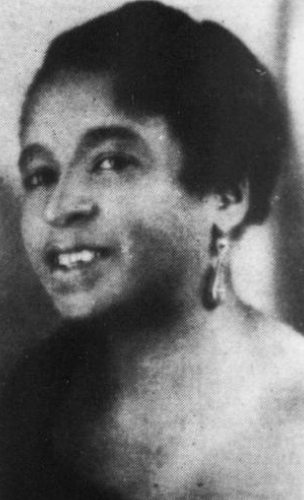
- Alyce Fraser Denny, from a 1927 publication
- Born: 17 October 1896; Georgetown, British Guiana
- Died: 28 June 1988 (aged 91); New York City, New York, U.S.
- Other names: Alice Fraser, Alice Fraser Robinson, Alyce Fraser Eaton, Alyce Eaton
- Occupations: Singer, voice teacher
- Known for: "The Songbird of British Guiana"
- Relatives: Hamilton Green (cousin)

Alyce Fraser Denny Eaton (28 June 1896 – 17 October 1988) was a singer and voice teacher, known as "the Songbird of British Guiana" (now Guyana).

== Early life and education ==
Fraser was born in Georgetown, British Guiana, the daughter of Archibald Fraser. She moved to New York City when she was 18 years old, and studied voice there with Caska Bonds.

== Career ==
Fraser toured as a soprano in the Caribbean, North and South America, and Great Britain. She sang European arias, folk songs, and Black spirituals. "She sang with intelligence and musical sense and seemed to give much pleasure to an enthusiastic audience," commented The Musical Leader about her 1927 performance at New York City's Town Hall venue.

Fraser worked as a church soloist in New York City, and conducted a choir for the United Negro Improvement Association. In 1928, she sang at a screening of Uncle Tom's Cabin in London. In 1930 she pleased an audience in Aberdare by singing a Welsh lullaby, "All Through the Night". In 1932 and 1933, she performed with pianist and singer Amy Gibbons in England and Wales.

Later in life, Fraser taught voice and piano classes in New York City.

== Personal life and legacy ==
Fraser married three times. She was married to Arthur F. Robinson, railroad cook from Barbados, in 1918. She married a Georgetown official, James Sydney Denny, in 1933, in a ceremony described as "the most impressive in the history of British Guiana", requiring a significant police presence to manage the crowds of onlookers. She was a widow by 1949, and remarried in 1953 to Detroit businessman William Edward Eaton. In 1986, her cousin Hamilton Green, the prime minister of Guyana, visited her in a nursing home in Hyde Park. She died in 1988, at the age of 91, in New York.

In 1992, a bust of Alyce Fraser was dedicated in the National Cultural Centre in Guyana.
