= Fassade =

Studio album by Lacrimosa
- Released: 1 October 2001
- Studio: Impuls Musicproductions, Hamburg
- Genre: Gothic metal
- Length: 52:55
- Label: Hall of Sermon HOS 7840, Nuclear Blast
- Producer: Tilo Wolff

Lacrimosa chronology
Elodia (1999)	Fassade (2001)	Echos (2003)

Fassade (English: Facade) is the seventh album by German duo Lacrimosa released on 1 October 2001 by Hall of Sermon and Nuclear Blast.

== Themes ==
Whereas the previous album, Elodia, centered on love, Fassade's theme is that of a lonely individual feeling overwhelmed by society, exemplified by the central song, Fassade, divided into three Sätze (movements), and the album's artwork. There are also sounds between symphonic gothic metal and funeral doom metal rhythms and patterns, as seen in Fassade's different parts.

The album's cover shows a crowd of men and women identically dressed in what can be assumed to be grey (the album's cover is in greyscale), emotionlessly watching three women wearing gothic lingerie parade down a catwalk. Every single individual in the audience has his or her head wired to the person next to them, implying that they are all part of a hivemind. The only person present other than the models and the audience is Lacrimosa's trademark clown, standing in a side door. The back of the album's cover shows that the back wall of the theater has fallen away, revealing nothing but fog and the top of a skyscraper.

== Reception ==
Professional ratings
Review scores
Source	Rating
Exclaim!	favorable
Sonic Seducer	favorable

Fassade received positive reviews from the Canadian Exclaim! magazine as well as from the German Sonic Seducer. Exclaim! noted that the German vocals added to the overall "doom and gloom atmosphere" but was reluctant about the fact that all songs seemingly end too abruptly. The Seducer marked a surprisingly intense singing by Tilo Wolff and concluded that both singers Wolff and Nurmi would demand much attention from the listener.

== Track listing ==
No.	Title	English title	Length
1.	"Fassade - 1. Satz"	Facade - 1st Movement	9:16
2.	"Der Morgen danach"	The Morning After	4:17
3.	"Senses"	Senses	6:03
4.	"Warum so tief?"	Why So Deep?	9:11
5.	"Fassade - 2. Satz"	Facade - 2nd Movement	5:34
6.	"Liebesspiel"	Loveplay	4:38
7.	"Stumme Worte"	Silent Words	5:57
8.	"Fassade - 3. Satz"	Facade - 3rd Movement	7:44

== Personnel ==
- Arranged By, Orchestrated By, Producer, vocals – Tilo Wolff
- Anne Nurmi – vocals, keyboards
- Jay P. – lead guitar, bass
- Sascha Gerbig – rhythm guitar
- Mr AC (Rüdiger Dreffein) – drums
- Manne Uhlig – drums
- Mastered By – Helge Halvé
- Orchestra – Deutsches Filmorchester Babelsberg
- Recorded By [Recordings Deutsches Filmorchester Babelsberg] – Michael Schubert
- Recorded By, Mixed By – JP Genkel
- Text By, Music By – Anne Nurmi (tracks: 3), Tilo Wolff (tracks: 1, 2, 4 to 8)

== Charts ==
Chart (2001)	Peak position
German Albums (Offizielle Top 100)	20
Polish Albums (ZPAV)	31
