= Wem Town Hall =

Municipal building in Wem, Shropshire, England

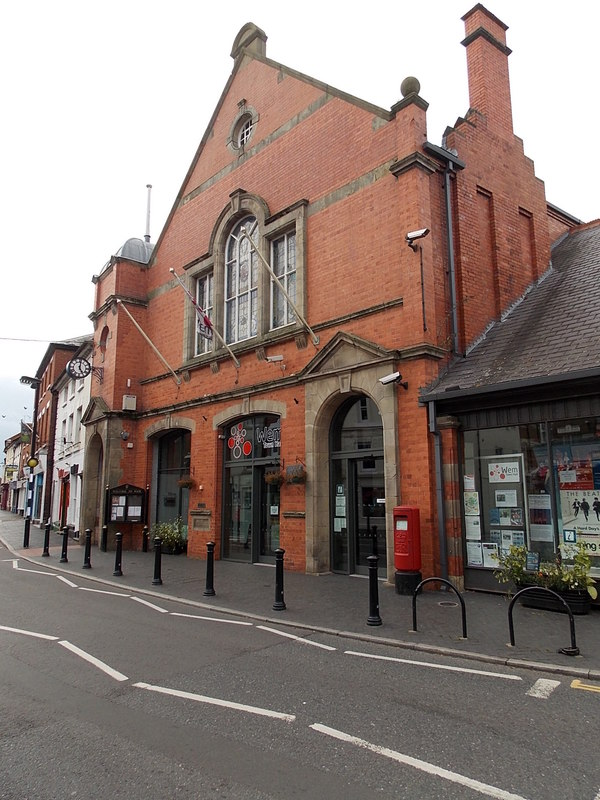
- Wem Town Hall

- Location within Shropshire

General information
- Architectural style: Victorian style
- Location: Wem
- Coordinates: 52.8555°N 2.7245°W
- Inaugurated: 1905

Wem Town Hall is a building in the market-town of Wem in Shropshire, England. It is currently used as a venue for music and dance concerts, films, stage shows and exhibitions.

The interior of the building was completely destroyed by fire on 19 November 1995. The incident became famous as a result of a black-and-white photo taken by amateur photographer Tony O'Rahilly, which appeared to depict the image of a young girl in the doorway of the burning building. The image was later proven to be fake after the source image of the alleged ghost girl was discovered to be copied from a postcard from 1922.

== History ==
The building was built in red brick and completed in 1905. Part of the town hall was operating as a cinema, managed by the Cheshire Animated Picture Company, from the early 20th century. An AWH Sound System, named after its inventor, Arthur William Harris, was installed in the cinema in 1934. After a fire gutted the building in November 1995, the facility was rebuilt, retaining the old Edwardian-era façade but replacing the rest of the building. The building re-opened as a community arts centre in 2000.

== Apparitional experience ==
During the fire on 19 November 1995, Tony O'Rahilly, a sewage farm worker who was also an amateur photographer, was originally stopped by police from approaching the burning building. He took a picture of the blaze from across the road with a 200mm lens. It appeared to depict the image of a young girl in the doorway of the burning building. Locals averred that this was the ghost of Jane Churm, a young girl who was accused (in 1677) of starting a fire in the same town. The image of a girl in the doorway of the burning building was not noticed by the photographer or the onlookers; it only appeared after the photo had been developed.

O'Rahilly sent the photo for analysis to the Association for the Scientific Study of Anomalous Phenomena (ASSAP), which determined that a burning piece of wood lay on the railing where the image appears, rendering the image a simulacrum. ASSAP forwarded the photo to the former Royal Photographic Society president, Dr. Vernon Harrison. Harrison concluded that the image did appear to be genuine, but he continued to be sceptical, believing it could have been the smoke or light playing tricks.

Blake Smith for Skeptical Inquirer writes "A later analysis by photographic officers of the National Media Museum concluded that the photograph was doctored. A negative made from the photograph (not the original negative) showed horizontal scan lines consistent with those of a television image across the image of the girl. The officers concluded that the girl's image was likely pasted into the photograph."

In 2010, five years after the death of the photographer, a 77-year-old local resident debunked the photograph as fake, showing that the girl in the photograph was superimposed from an image of a girl printed on a postcard that appeared in the local paper Shropshire Star in 1922.
