= Elis Manninen =

Finnish Lutheran pastor and politician (1909–1997)

Elis Olavi Carolus Manninen (18 February 1909 – 21 February 1997) was a Finnish Lutheran pastor and politician, born in Liperi. He was a member of the Parliament of Finland from 1958 to 1966, representing the Social Democratic Party of Finland (SDP). He was a presidential elector in the 1956 and 1962 presidential elections.
