= Ellis Marsalis =

Ellis Marsalis may refer to:

- Ellis Marsalis Sr. (1908–2004), American businessman
- Ellis Marsalis Jr. (1934–2020), American jazz pianist
