= Alyce Frank =

American painter (1932–2024)

- Born: 1932; New Iberia, Louisiana
- Died: January 16, 2024 (aged 91–92); Santa Cruz, California
- Known for: Landscape painting
- Notable work: The Upper Falls at Yosemite

Alyce Frank (1932 – January 16, 2024) was an American landscape painter.

== Early life ==
Frank was born in New Iberia, Louisiana, in 1932. She moved to Los Angeles and Tulsa at a young age. At the age of 15, she applied to a liberal arts program and was accepted at the University of Chicago, graduating three years later, in 1950. She moved to Los Angeles, where she attended graduate school at UCLA and the University of Southern California (USC). At USC she met Larry Frank, an aspiring filmmaker; they married in 1953.

For ten years, she worked on educational films that her husband produced. Her work as a film editor helped cultivate her sense of composition, something that served her well when she took up painting.

== Career ==
She moved to New Mexico in 1962 and began painting in 1973, specializing in boldly colored landscape paintings influenced by fauvism and German expressionism.

In 1983, she was selected for a master class with Richard Diebenkorn at the Santa Fe Institute of Art.

Frank collaborated with many artists in nearby Taos, New Mexico, and referred to herself as a "Taos Expressionist". She was a long-time painting partner of Taos artist Barbara Zaring.

Over 26 years, she created a large body of work, completing more than 600 canvases, primarily large landscapes as well as nearly one hundred portraits. Her works were collected into the book The Magical Realism of Alyce Frank by Joseph Dispenza in 1999.

Her painting The Upper Falls at Yosemite (ca. 1996) was part of an exhibition on the art of Yosemite which appeared at the Autry National Center, the Oakland Museum of California, the Nevada Museum of Art and the Eiteljorg Museum of American Indians and Western Art from 2006 to 2008.

== Personal life ==
She was a resident of Arroyo Hondo, New Mexico, and was married to Larry Frank, a filmmaker and author, until his death. They collected Native American and Hispano American art and artifacts. They had three children.

She died in Santa Cruz, California on January 16, 2024.
