= Twilight (Erben der Schöpfung album) =

Studio album by Erben der Schöpfung
- Released: December 7, 2001
- Recorded: Mastersound Studio
- Genre: Electro; Gothic metal
- Length: 59:05 minutes
- Label: M.O.S. Records ltd Napalm Records
- Producer: Alexander Krull

Erben der Schöpfung chronology
Twilight (2001)	Narben der Zeit (2009)

Twilight is the debut studio album of the Liechtenstein gothic metal band Erben der Schöpfung.

== Prelude ==
"Twilight" turned out to be an Electro, Gothic metal album with classical female vocals by Sabine Dünser. Lyricwise Erben der Schöpfung concentrated on topics as death and ageing. Also a poem of Georg Trakl named "An den Knaben Elis" was processed in the song "Elis".

== Track listing ==
1. Elis (5:53)
2. Sleep and Death (5:00)
3. By My Side (5:05)
4. Eine Rose für den Abschied (5:49)
5. Niemand kennt den Tod (5:44)
6. My Star (6:32)
7. Ade (5:52)
8. Alone (5:52)
9. Doch sie wartet vergebens... (4:52)

== Release ==
First release was on December 7, 2001 under the label M.O.S. Records ltd. which was coupled with a single release of the track "Elis". After signing by Napalm Records, there was a re-release on 13 August 2003.
