= Tilo Wolff =

German musician (born 1972)

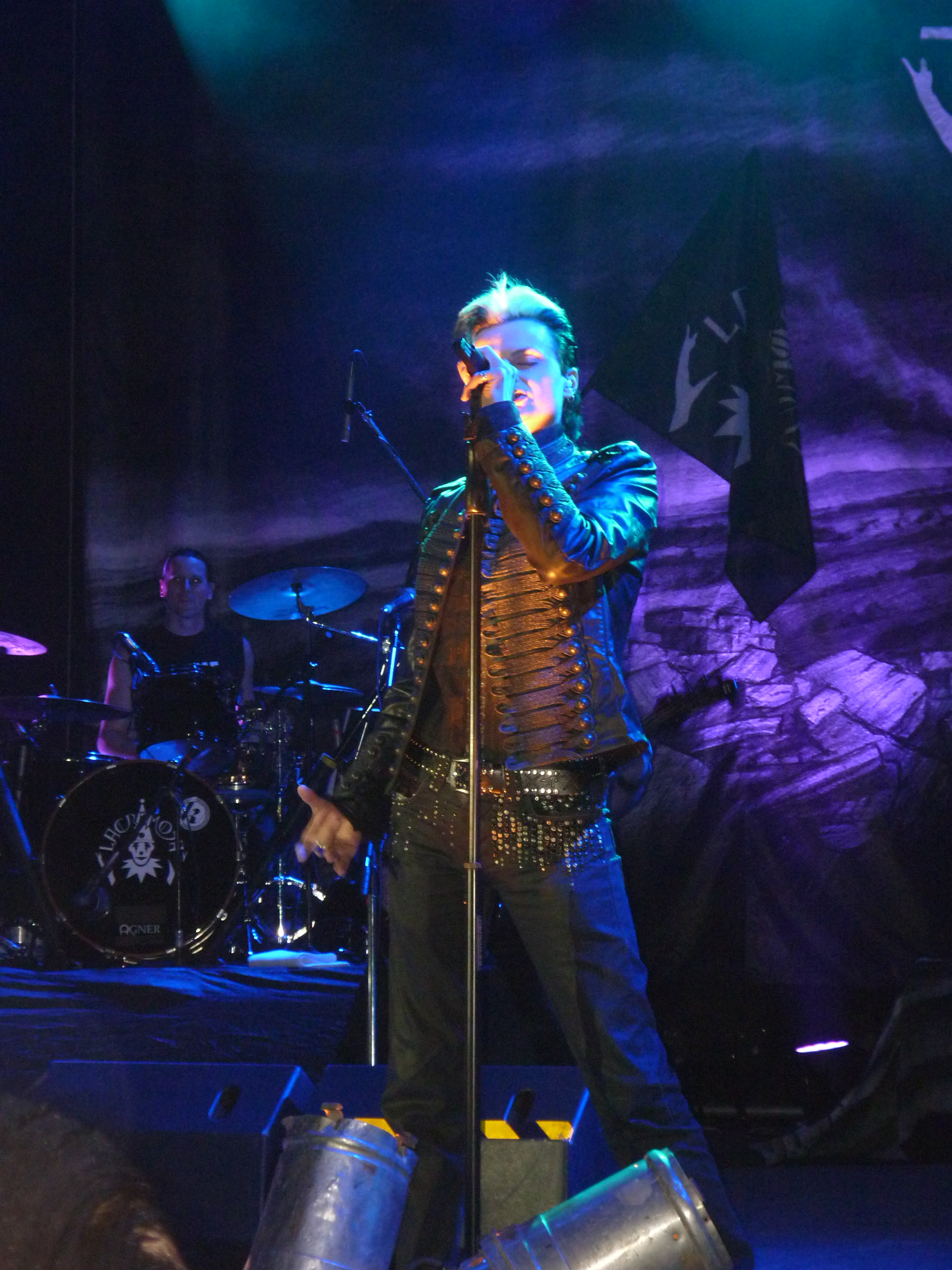
- Tilo Wolff performing with Lacrimosa in Puebla, Mexico in 2013

Background information
- Born: 10 July 1972 (age 53); Frankfurt am Main, West Germany (now Germany)
- Genres: Gothic metal, darkwave, Symphonic metal
- Occupations: Musician, producer, composer, arranger
- Instruments: Vocals, piano, guitar, bass guitar
- Years active: 1990–present
- Label: Hall of Sermon
- Formerly of: Lacrimosa; Dreams of Sanity; Girls Under Glass

Tilo Wolff (born 10 July 1972) is a German musician and artist. He was born in Frankfurt am Main and currently lives in Switzerland.

His longest-running project is the band Lacrimosa, which debuted in 1990. The band embraces a diverse range of gothic, darkwave and orchestral musical styles. Wolff composes, arranges, and writes the lyrics for almost all of Lacrimosa's songs. He also sings and plays piano for the songs and has contributed to the design of the album sleeves.

The same year Lacrimosa was founded, Wolff founded the independent record label, "Hall of Sermon" to finance Lacrimosa without being dependent on outside record companies. Hall of Sermon now has eight darkwave bands other than Lacrimosa on its books, including Dreams of Sanity and Girls Under Glass.

In 2004, Wolff founded Snakeskin, another band, which diverts significantly from Lacrimosa's music.

Wolff was also the manager of the German band Cinema Bizarre. He also DJs, playing festivals and clubs across Europe.

== Discography ==
=== Lacrimosa albums ===
==== Studio albums ====
Year	Title	Peak positions				
Year	Title	GER	SWI	AUT	MEX	POL
1991	Angst	–	–	–	–	–
1992	Einsamkeit	–	–	–	–	–
1993	Satura	–	–	–	–	–
1995	Inferno	81	–	–	–	–
1997	Stille	64	–	–	–	–
1999	Elodia	12	–	–	–	–
2001	Fassade	20	–	–	–	31
2003	Echos	13	–	–	–	–
2005	Lichtgestalt	30	–	–	–	21
2009	Sehnsucht	35	82	68	49	–
2012	Revolution	35	–	–	–	–
2015	Hoffnung	28	–	–	–	–
2017	Testimonium	32	–	–	–	–
2021	Leidenschaft	–	–	–	–	–
2025	Lament	–	–	–	–	–

==== Live albums ====
Year	Title	Peak positions	
Year	Title	GER	MEX
1998	Live (2 CD)	–	–
2007	Lichtjahre (2 CD)	70	64
2014	Live in Mexico City (2 CD)	–	–

==== Compilations ====
Year	Title	Peak positions	
Year	Title	GER	MEX
2002	Vintage Classix (7 LPs)	–	
2010	Schattenspiel	51	51
