= Ellis Spring =

Unincorporated community in the state of Georgia

Coordinates: 34°55′25″N 85°09′50″W

Ellis Spring is a spring in Catoosa County, Georgia, in the United States.

Ellis Spring was named for a local family who settled near this stream.
