= Ellis Island (Missouri) =

River island of the Mississippi River, U.S.

Coordinates: 38°52′28″N 90°10′49″W

Ellis Island is an island in the Mississippi River. The island is entirely within St. Charles County, Missouri.

The namesake of Ellis Island is unknown.
