= El Limonar International School =

El Limonar International School (ELIS) refers to a pair of international schools in Spain, operated by the Cognita Group:

- El Limonar International School, Murcia
- El Limonar International School, Villamartin
