= Ellice (1824 ship) =

Merchant ship

History

United Kingdom
- Name: Ellice
- Owner: Ellice & Co.
- Builder: Phillip Lang, Sunderland
- Launched: 1824
- Fate: Disappeared after April 1829

General characteristics
- Tons burthen: 311 (bm)

Ellice was launched in 1824 in Sunderland as a West Indiaman.

Year	Master	Owner	Trade	Source & notes
1826	Stanners; Whitmore	Ellice & Co.	London–Tobago	Lloyd's Register (LR)
1829	Whitmore	Ellice & Co.	London–Tobago	(LR)

Lloyd's List reported on 24 July 1829 that Ellice, with Whitmore as ship's master, had been missing since 28 April 1829.
