= Ellis Lloyd =

Ellis Lloyd may refer to:

- Ellis Lloyd (of Rhiwgogh), Welsh landowner and MP for Merioneth
- Charles Ellis Lloyd (1879–1939), known as Ellis Lloyd, novelist, barrister and politician
