= Ellis Roberts =

Ellis Roberts may refer to:

- Ellis H. Roberts (1827–1918), United States Representative from New York
- Ellis William Roberts (1860–1930), English portrait painter
