= Ellice (1798 ship) =

Cargo and passenger transport ship (1800–1817)

History

Great Britain
- Name: Ellice
- Owner: J.Mellish
- Builder: Bermuda
- Launched: 1798
- Fate: Wrecked 1 November 1817

General characteristics
- Tons burthen: 368, or 370, or 374, or 376, (bm)
- Armament: 1800: 4 × 6-pounder guns; 1809: 10 × 18-pounder carronades; 1812: 2 × 6-pounder guns + 8 × 18-pounder carronades

Ellice (also known as Ellis or Ellise) was launched in 1798 in Bermuda. From 1800 until her loss in 1817, she served as a hired transport for the government, carrying passengers and cargo between London and the Mediterranean, including destinations as far as Malta. She was wrecked in November 1817.

== Career ==
Ellice entered Lloyd's Register (LR) in 1800 with J.Dryden, master, Mellish & Co, owner, and trade London transport. She had damages repaired in 1800.

Year	Master	Owner	Trade	Source & notes
1801	J.Dryden	Mellish	London transport	LR; damages repaired 1800
1807	J.Dryden	Mellish	London transport	LR; damages repaired 1800
1809	Longstaff	Mellish	London transport	RS – Ellis
1811	Longstaff	Mellish	London transport	RS – Ellis
1812	Longstaff	Mellish	London transport	LR; thorough repair 1812
1815	Longstaff	Mellish	London transport	Register of Shipping; thorough repair 1811
1818	J.Scott	Mellish	London–Malta	LR; thorough repair 1812

== Fate ==
The transport ship Ellice was wrecked on 1 November 1817, on the north coast of Spain. By one report, 144 passengers and the crew were rescued. LLoyd's List reported that the wreck took place on 5 November and that an officer to the 60th Regiment and about 30 others were drowned.
