= Elis (Arcadia) =

Unlocated town of ancient Arcadia

Elis (Ancient Greek: Ἦλις) was a town of ancient Arcadia mentioned by Stephanus of Byzantium.

Its site is unlocated.
