= Ellis Island (Queensland) =

Ellis Island Queensland
- Coordinates: 13°22′05″S 143°41′31″E
- Established: 2014
- LGA(s): Cook Regional Council
- State electorate(s): Cook
- Federal division(s): Leichhardt

Ellis Island is part of the Great Barrier Reef Marine Park West of Cape Melville, Queensland and East of Coen in the Claremont Isles between the first three-mile (4.8 km) and the second three-mile opening of the Barrier Reef.

The elevation of the terrain is 1.57 metres.
