= Revolution (Lacrimosa album) =

Studio album by Lacrimosa
- Released: 7 September 2012
- Recorded: 2012
- Genre: Gothic metal, gothic rock
- Length: 54:09
- Label: Hall of Sermon HOS 8030
- Producer: Tilo Wolff

Lacrimosa chronology
| Sehnsucht (2009) | Revolution (2012) | Hoffnung (2015) |

Revolution is the 11th studio album by the German gothic rock duo Lacrimosa. It was released on 7 September 2012 by Hall of Sermon. The album provides a mix of musical styles like classical instrumentation and aggressive rock.

== Reception ==
Professional ratings
Review scores
| Source | Rating |
|---|---|
| Orkus | 9.5/10 |
| Powermetal.de | 8.5/10 |

In an announcement for their 'Tip of the Week', the Sonic Seducer magazine noted a "remarkably broad spectrum" of styles typical for Lacrimosa, and remarked a sometimes "unpolished" sound. A more detailed review by Powermetal.de wrote that the album's content was unusually direct for a work by Lacrimosa. The reviewer noted the guitar play of guest musician Mille Petrozza but was also critical of singer Tilo Wolff's English language skills in the song "This Is The Night". He wrote however that the "true revolution" of the album was offering music for a broad audience while not denying Lacrimosa's musical roots and ideals. The cover art for the album was interpreted in this review as a reference to the album's name: the band's mascot, a harlequin, is standing above the debris of the revolution, waving a flag. The Orkus magazine selected Revolution as 'album of the month' in the October 2012 issue. The review noted a contrast between a seemingly familiar sound by Lacrimosa and the new roughness and direct lyrics of the album.

The album peaked at position 35 in the German album charts.

== Style ==
Revolution features a mix of guitar-based heavy metal and orchestral sounds. Especially the title track "Revolution" has been noted as an exceptionally hard and aggressive track while "If The World" is inspired by female-fronted metal.

== Personnel ==
The album was recorded with the help of two guest musicians: guitarist Mille Petrozza from Kreator and drummer Stefan Schwarzmann of Accept.

== Track listing ==
| No. | Title | Length |
|---|---|---|
| 1. | "Irgendein Arsch ist immer unterwegs" | 5:00 |
| 2. | "If the World Stood Still a Day" | 3:35 |
| 3. | "Verloren" | 7:29 |
| 4. | "This Is the Night" | 5:29 |
| 5. | "Interlude – Feuerzug (Part 1) – instrumental" | 0:46 |
| 6. | "Feuerzug (Part 2)" | 4:41 |
| 7. | "Refugium" | 4:42 |
| 8. | "Weil Du Hilfe brauchst" | 6:01 |
| 9. | "Rote Sinfonie" | 11:03 |
| 10. | "Revolution" | 5:23 |

== Musicians ==
- Tilo Wolff: vocals (1,3,4,6,7,8,9,10); piano (1,4,7,9); bass (1,2,3,4,6,8,9,10); add guitar (1); guitar (2,9); drums programming (3,10); acoustic guitar (6,8); trumpet (10); flugelhorn (10).
- Anne Nurmi: keyboards (1,3,4,6,7,8,9,10); choir (1,9); vocals (2,6,10).
- Mille Petrozza: guitar (1,3,4,8,10).
- J. P. Genkel: guitar (3,4,9).
- Henrik Flyman: guitar (6,9).
- Stefan Schwarzmann: drums (1,4,10).
- Arturo Garcia: drums (2,8).
- Manne Uhlig: drums (3,6,9).
- Christina Grabka: violin (6,9).
- Die Spielmann-Schnyder: orchestra.
