= Elis (song) =

Single by Erben der Schöpfung

from the album Twilight
- Released: April 23, 2001(Europe)
- Genre: Electro; Gothic metal
- Length: 23:44 minutes
- Songwriter(s): Georg Trakl; Sabine Dünser; Oliver Falk
- Producer(s): Alexander Krull

Erben der Schöpfung singles chronology
"Elis" (2001)	"Der Letzte Tag (as Elis)" (2004)

"Elis" is a song composed by the Electro-Gothic metal band Erben der Schöpfung, from its 2001 debut album Twilight.

== History ==
The song is also a poem of Georg Trakl named "An den Knaben Elis".

== Track listing ==
1. Elis - 5:53
2. Elis (English version) - 5:53
3. Elis (Remix by NoyceTM) - 5:47
4. Elis (Remix by Spiritual Cramp) - 6:09

== Release ==
Elis was released on 23 April 2001 over M.O.S. Records and the re-release was on January 1, 2003 from the German label Napalm Records.

== Credits ==
- Sabine Dünser - Vocals
- Oliver Falk - Keyboards
- Pete Streit - Guitar
- Tom Saxer - Guitar
- Jürgen Broger - Bass
- Franky Koller - Drums
