= Ellice (given name) =

Ellice is a given name which may refer to:

== Women ==
- Ellice Eadie (1912–2001), Irish-born English barrister and civil servant
- Ellice Handy (1902–1989), Singaporean educator, education administrator and cookbook author
- Ellice Hopkins (1836–1904), English social campaigner and author
- Ellice Nosworthy (1897–1972), Australian architect, one of Australia's first female architects
- Ellice Pilkington (1869–1936), Irish women's activist and artist

== Men ==
- Ellis (Nez Perce) (1810–1848), also spelled Ellice, Nez Perce leader
- Ellice Horsburgh (1870–1935), Scottish mathematician and engineer

== See also ==
- Alyce, a list of people with the given name
- Allyce Beasley (born 1954), American actress and comedienne
- Ellise Chappell (born 1992), English actress
- Ellyse Perry (born 1990), Australian female cricketer and footballer
