= Hoffnung (Lacrimosa album) =

Studio album by Lacrimosa
- Released: 6 November 2015
- Recorded: 2015
- Genre: Gothic metal, gothic rock
- Length: 1:02:38
- Label: Hall of Sermon HOS 8060
- Producer: Tilo Wolff

Lacrimosa chronology
Revolution (2012)	Hoffnung (2015)	Testimonium (2017)

Hoffnung (transl. Hope) is the 12th studio album by the German gothic rock duo Lacrimosa. The album was released on November 6, 2015, by Hall of Sermon label.

== Background ==
The recording of the album began in January 2015. An orchestra of 60 musicians was invited. The album was released on November 6, 2015, via Hall of Sermon. The date is timed to the twenty-fifth anniversary of the duo, which appeared in the fall of 1990, when Tilo Wolff released his first demo recording "Clamor". The album contains 10 songs, including "Mondfeuer"—the longest song (15:15) in the history of the band, which exceeds the length of the song "Die Strasse der Zeit" from the album Stille. In addition to the standard edition, the group released the deluxe edition, supplemented by an alternative version of the song "Keine Schatten mehr" and a bonus DVD of the Lacrimosa concert in Mexico City.

The first songs from the album performed at the concert were "Keine Schatten mehr" and "Kaleidoskop". They were presented at the first of two anniversary concerts in Germany, which took place on September 18, 2015, in Oberhausen. The second concert took place on September 19 in Dresden. During these concerts, the album cover was also shown for the first time. Its author is Shteleo Diamantopoulos, a permanent artist for Lacrimosa, who designed the covers of all previous studio albums.

== Tour ==
The supporting tour called Unterwelt-tour (transl. Underworld tour), started with a concert in Minsk on November 13, 2015. As part of the tour, the musicians performed in Belarus, Russia, mainland China, Taiwan, Japan, Mexico, Brazil, Argentina, Chile, Peru, Bolivia, Colombia, Germany and Belgium.

== Track listing ==
All tracks are written by Tilo Wolff except for "Thunder and Lightning" written by Tilo Wolff and Anne Nurmi.

No.	Title	Length
1.	"Mondfeuer"	15:15
2.	"Kaleidoskop"	6:15
3.	"Unterwelt"	3:49
4.	"Die unbekannte Farbe"	5:35
5.	"Der Kelch der Hoffnung"	3:23
6.	"Thunder and Lightning"	3:55
7.	"Tränen der Liebe"	6:39
8.	"Der freie Fall - Apeiron, Pt. 1"	6:17
9.	"Keine Schatten mehr"	2:28
10.	"Apeiron - Der freie Fall, Pt. 2"	9:07
Total length:		01:02:38

== Personnel ==
Lacrimosa

- Tilo Wolff – vocals, music, piano, guitar, bass, trumpet, programming
- Anne Nurmi – vocals, keyboard

Additional musicians

- Andre Wacker – viola
- David Underwood – bass guitar
- Jay P. Genkel – guitar
- Henrik Flyman – guitar
- Melanie Borczac – violin
- Arturo Garcia – drums
- Julien Schmidt – drums

Production

- Shteleo Diamantopoulos – cover
- Angst-im-wald Studio – design
