= Siegfried (band) =

Austrian heavy metal band founded in 1998

Siegfried is a heavy metal band from Austria that was founded in 1998 by Bruder Cle, aka Hagen, who was later joined by Daniel Bachmaier (ex Sarcasm Syndrome), a.k.a. Ortwin, and former Dreams of Sanity singer Sandra Schleret. In 2000 they released a demo CD called Fafnir. Later in 2000 they were signed to Napalm Records, releasing their first album, Drachenherz, in 2001. Their second album, Eisenwinter, was released in 2003. The lyrics of Siegfried are based on and inspired by the Nibelung Saga.

According to Sandra Schleret as of April 25, 2008, "Siegfried is still together and working on a new album (pre-production is finished except the vocals for two songs.)"

In May 2009 Siegfried recorded their third album, Nibelung, in Alex Krull's well-known Mastersound studios. Nibelung was released in November 2009.

== Line-up ==
- Sandra Schleret – Female vocals
- Werner Bialek – Epic Male vocals
- Bruder Cle – Harsh Male vocals
- Daniel Bachmaier – Guitar and keyboards
- Roland Wurzer – Bass
- Hannes Krause – Keyboards
- Moritz Neuner – Drums

== Discography ==
- Fafnir demo (2000)
- Drachenherz (2001)
- Eisenwinter (2003)
- Nibelung (2009)
