= Dreams of Sanity =

Austrian gothic metal band

- Origin: Innsbruck, Austria
- Genres: Gothic metal, progressive metal
- Years active: 1991–2002
- Label: Hall of Sermon
- Members: Michael Knoflach; Christian K. Marx; Andreas Wildauer; Sandra Schleret; Patrick Schrittwieser; Florian Steiner
- Past members: See below

Dreams of Sanity was a gothic metal band from Austria. Founded in 1991, they released three full-length albums, before disbanding in 2002.

== History ==
After forming in 1991, Dreams of Sanity released two demos in 1994 and 1996. They toured Europe late in 1996 before releasing their proper debut in 1997, which was inspired by The Divine Comedy of Dante Alighieri. Two further full-lengths were issued by the band, the first based upon Phantom of the Opera and the second exploring the concept of life as a game. The group went through a series of lineup changes around the recording of the third album. Following this they were dropped by their label Hall of Sermon; the group broke up in 2002.

== Members ==
Final line-up

- Michael Knoflach - bass (1991-2002)
- Christian K. Marx - guitars (1991-2002)
- Andreas Wildauer - guitars (1994-2002)
- Sandra Schleret - lead vocals (1994-2000, 2001-2002)
- Patrick Schrittwieser - drums (1999-2002)
- Florian Steiner - keyboards (2000-2002)

Session & Touring members

- Laura Angelmayer - vocals (1993)
- Tilo Wolff - male vocals (1999)
- Jan Peter - guitars (1999-2000)

Former members

- Hannes Richter - drums (1991-1993)
- Florian Ratzesberger - keyboards (1992-1993), Guitars (1993-1994)
- Gudrun Gfrerer - lead vocals (1992-1993)
- Romed Astner - drums (1993-1997)
- Stefan Manges - keyboards (1993-1997)
- Robert - lead vocals (1993-1994)
- Birgit Moser - lead vocals (1993-1994)
- Martina Hornbacher - vocals (1994-1997)
- Harald Obexer - drums (1997-1999)
- Frédéric Heil - keyboards (1997-2000)
- Barbara Peer - vocals (2000-2001)

Timeline

== Discography ==
Demos

- Demo (1994)
- A God Damned City (demo compilation CD, 1995)
- Ein Liebeslied (demo, 1996)

Studio albums

- Komödia (Hall of Sermon, 1997)
- Masquerade (Hall of Sermon, 1999)
- The Game (Hall of Sermon, 2000)

Singles

- Window to the Sky (2000)

== Videos ==
- (1999) Blade of Doom (Live in Mexico)
- (1999) The Maiden and the River (Live in Mexico)
- (1999) Treesitter (Live in Mexico)
