= Ellis =

Ellis is a surname of Welsh and English origin. An independent French origin of the surname is said to derive from the phrase fleur-de-lis.

People with the surname include:

== A ==
- Abby Ellis, American documentary filmmaker, journalist, editor, and cinematographer
- Adam Ellis, American webcomic artist
- Adam Ellis (born 1996), British grasstrack and speedway rider
- Adam Gibb Ellis, Chief Justice of Jamaica
- Adrienne Ellis (c. 1941–2019), American-Canadian actress
- Albert Ellis (disambiguation), multiple people
- Alexander Ellis (disambiguation), multiple people
- Allan Ellis (disambiguation)
- Alton Ellis (1938–2008), Jamaican musician
- Andrew Ellis (disambiguation), multiple people
- Anita Ellis, Canadian-born American singer and actress
- Annette Ellis (born 1946), Australian politician
- Arthur Ellis (disambiguation), multiple people
- Atom Ellis (born 1966), American musician
- Aunjanue Ellis (born 1969), American actress

== B ==
- Ben Ellis (disambiguation), multiple actress
- Bill Ellis (1919–2007), English cricketer
- Boaz Ellis (born 1981), Israeli fencer
- Bob Ellis (1942–2016), Australian writer and journalist
- Bob Ellis (cricketer) (born 1940), Scottish cricketer
- Bobby Ellis (1932–2016), Jamaican trumpeter
- Boogie Ellis (born 2000), American basketball player
- Brad Ellis, American composer and musical director
- Bret Easton Ellis (born 1964), American novelist
- Bri Ellis (born 2003), American softball player
- Brian Ellis (disambiguation), multiple people

== C ==
- C. P. Ellis (1927–2005), American Ku Klux Klan leader turned civil rights activist
- Caroline Ellis (born 1950), American actress
- Carson Ellis (born 1975), American artist
- Charles Ellis (disambiguation), multiple people
- Chris Ellis (disambiguation), multiple people
- Rev Clement Ellis (1633–1700), English clergyman
- Clough Williams-Ellis (1883–1978), Welsh architect
- Colten Ellis (born 2000), Canadian ice hockey player
- Constance Ellis (1872–1942), first woman to graduate from the University of Melbourne as a Doctor of Medicine (1903)
- Craig Ellis (Australian rules footballer) (born 1974), Australian footballer
- Craig Ellis (gridiron football) (born 1961), Canadian football player

== D ==
- Dale Ellis (born 1960), American basketball player
- Dana Ellis (born 1980), Canadian pole-vaulter
- Daniel Ellis (disambiguation) or Dan Ellis, multiple people
- David Ellis (disambiguation) or Dave Ellis, multiple people
- DeGoy B. Ellis (1876–1949), American politician and lawyer
- Dame Di Ellis (1938–2017), English rower
- Dessie Ellis (born 1938), Irish politician
- Diane Ellis (1909–1930), American actress
- Dick Ellis (1895–1975), treacherous intelligence officer
- Dock Ellis (1945–2008), American baseball player
- Dock Ellis (born 1955) American radio DJ
- Don Ellis (1934–1978), American jazz trumpeter
- Donna Ellis, American politician
- Dorothy Ellis (1935–2018), American blues singer
- Doug Ellis (1924–2018), English entrepreneur
- Drew Ellis (disambiguation), multiple people
- Duke Ellis (born 1998), American baseball player

== E ==
- Earl Hancock Ellis (1880–1923), US Marine Corps intelligence officer
- Edgar C. Ellis (1854–1947), American politician and lawyer
- Edith Ellis (1861–1916), English author and women's rights activist
- Edmund Ellis (disambiguation), multiple people
- Edward Ellis (disambiguation), multiple people
- Edwin Ellis (disambiguation), multiple people
- Eleanor Joan Ellis (1904–1989), English artist
- Eliécer Ellis (born 1945), Panamanian basketball player
- Ellen Deborah Ellis (1878–1974), American historian and political scientist
- Ellis Bell (1818–1848), pseudonym of Emily Jane Bronte
- Emory Ellis (1906–2003), American biochemist
- Ephraim Ellis (born 1985), Canadian actor
- Eric Ellis (disambiguation), multiple people
- Ernest Ellis (1885–1916), English footballer
- Evelyn Ellis (1894–1958), American actress

== F ==
- Felix Ellis, Australian politician
- Fiona Ellis, British philosopher
- Frampton Ellis, American designer and inventor
- Francis Ellis (disambiguation), multiple people
- Frank Ellis (disambiguation), multiple people
- Fred Ellis (disambiguation), multiple people
- Francis Whyte Ellis (1777–1819), British civil servant in the Madras Presidency and scholar of Tamil and Sanskrit

== G ==
- Gary Ellis (born 1968), American BMX racer
- Geoff Ellis (born 1950), Welsh cricketer
- George Ellis (disambiguation), multiple people
- George Agar-Ellis, 1st Baron Dover (1797–1833), British politician
- Georgia Ellis (1917–1988), American actress
- Gerry Ellis (born 1957), American football player
- Gordon Ellis (1920–1978), British maritime artist
- Gordon Bennett Ellis, Canadian politician
- Grant Ellis (born 1993), American television personality
- Greg Ellis (disambiguation), multiple people

== H ==
- Harold Ellis (disambiguation), multiple people
- Harry Ellis (born 1982), English rugby player
- Harvey Ellis (1852–1904), American architect, gfgte perspective renderer and painter
- Havelock Ellis (1859–1939), English sexual psychologist
- Henry Ellis (disambiguation), multiple people
- Herb Ellis (1921–2010), American jazz guitarist
- Herbert Ellis (disambiguation), multiple people
- Hortense Ellis (1941–2000), Jamaican reggae artist
- Hunter Ellis (born 1968), American television personality

== I ==
- Isadore Ellis, American animator (1910–1994)

== J ==
- C. Jack Ellis, American politician from Georgia
- J. Delano Ellis (1944–2020), American Pentecostal bishop and writer
- Jack Ellis (disambiguation), multiple people
- James Ellis (disambiguation), multiple people
- James Ellis Humphrey (1861–1897), American botanist and mycologist
- Jan Ellis (1942–2013), South African rugby player
- Janet Ellis (born 1955), English television presenter
- Jason Ellis (born 1971), Australian skateboarder, mixed martial artist, radio host and actor
- Jay Ellis (born 1981), American actor
- Jeff Ellis (disambiguation), multiple people
- Jerry Ellis (disambiguation), multiple people
- Jessica Ellis (born 1987), British actress
- Jill Ellis (born 1966), English-born American soccer player and coach
- Jim Ellis (disambiguation), multiple people
- Jimmy Ellis (disambiguation), multiple people
- Jo Ellis (born 1983) English field hockey forward
- Joanne Ellis (born 1981), English field hockey player
- Job Bicknell Ellis (1829–1905), American mycologist
- John Ellis (disambiguation), multiple people
- Joseph Ellis (born 1943), American historian
- June Ellis (1926–2011), English actress
- Justin Ellis (born 1990), American football player
- Justin Ellis (soccer) (born 2007), American soccer player

== K ==
- Kaden Elliss (born 1995), American football player
- Kai Ellis (born 1980), Canadian football player
- Kate Ellis (author), British author of crime fiction
- Kate Ellis (politician) (born 1977), Australian politician
- Katharine Ellis, British musicologist and academic
- Katherine Ellis, English singer-songwriter
- Kathleen Ellis (born 1946), former American swimmer
- Keith Ellis (disambiguation), multiple people
- Keon Ellis (born 2000), American basketball player
- Kerry Ellis (born 1979), English singer and stage actress
- Kevin Ellis (disambiguation), multiple people

== L ==
- LaPhonso Ellis (born 1970), American basketball player and analyst
- Larry R. Ellis (born 1946), American general
- Lauren Ellis (born 1989), New Zealand cyclist
- Lee Ellis (born 1942), American sociologist
- Leonora Beck Ellis (1862–1951), American educator, author, poet and social reformer
- LeRon Ellis (born 1969), American basketball player
- Leroy Ellis (1940–2012), American basketball player
- Lester Ellis (born 1965), English/Australian boxer
- Lindsay Ellis (footballer) (born 1935), Australian football player
- Lindsay Ellis (media critic) (born 1984), web video creator
- Lionel Ellis (1885–1970), British military historian
- Liz Ellis (born 1973), Australian netball player
- Luther Elliss (born 1973), American football player

== M ==
- Magen Ellis (born 1986), American beauty queen
- Marc Ellis (rugby) (born 1971), New Zealand businessman, television presenter and rugby player
- Marc H. Ellis (born 1952), American author
- Margaret Dye Ellis (1845–1925), American social reformer
- Mari Ellis (1913–2015), Welsh writer and women's rights activist
- Marion Durbin Ellis (1887–1972) American ichthyologist and entomologist
- Mark Ellis (disambiguation), multiple people
- Martin Beazor Ellis (1911–1996), British mycologist
- Mary Ellis (disambiguation), multiple people
- Mary Beth Ellis (born 1977), American triathlete
- Matt Ellis (disambiguation) or Matthew Ellis, multiple people
- Max Mapes Ellis (1887–1953), American ichthyologist
- Merrill Ellis (1916–1981), American electroacoustic composer
- Michael Ellis (disambiguation) or Mike Ellis, multiple people
- Monta Ellis (born 1985), American basketball player

== N ==
- Nancy Walker Bush Ellis (1926–2021), American political activist
- Nick Ellis, American psychologist
- Novalyne Price Ellis (1908–1999), American schoolteacher

== O ==
- Osian Ellis (1928–2021), Welsh harpist

== P ==
- Patricia Ellis (1916–1970), American film actress
- Patrick Ellis (educator) (1928–2013), brother of the Institute of Brothers of Christian Schools and president of CUA (1992–98)
- Patrick Ellis (radio host) (1943–2020), American radio show host
- Paul Ellis, New Zealand record producer
- Pee Wee Ellis (1941–2021), American saxophonist
- Perry Ellis (1940–1986), American fashion designer
- Peter Ellis (disambiguation), multiple people
- Philip Ellis (disambiguation), multiple people
- Phil Ellis (born 1981), English comedian and actor
- Pitts Ellis (1808–1875), American politician
- Powhatan Ellis (1790–1863), American politician from Mississippi

== R ==
- R. John Ellis (1935–2025), British biochemist and academic
- Ralph Ellis (disambiguation), multiple people
- Ray Ellis (1923–2008), American record producer and composer
- Ray Ellis (American football) (born 1959), American football player
- Raymond Ellis (1923–1994), British politician
- Reg Ellis (disambiguation), multiple people
- Richard Ellis (disambiguation), multiple people
- Rick Ellis (disambiguation), multiple people
- Rita Ellis (1950–2025), American politician from Florida
- Robert Ellis (disambiguation), multiple people
- Robin Ellis (born 1942), English actor
- Robinson Ellis (1834–1913), English classical scholar
- Rod Ellis, British linguist
- Rodney Ellis (born 1954), American politician from Texas
- Romallis Ellis (born 1965), American boxer
- Ron Ellis (1945–2024), Canadian ice hockey player
- Ronald Ellis (disambiguation), multiple people
- Rosemary Ellis (1910–1998), English artist
- Ross Ellis (1915–1983), Canadian politician
- Rowan Ellis, British YouTuber and author
- Rowland Ellis (1650–1731), Welsh Quaker
- Rowland Ellis (bishop) (1841–1911), Welsh clergyman
- Roxanne Ellis (1942–1995), American murder victim
- Royston Ellis (1941–2023), English writer
- Ruth Ellis (1926–1955), last woman to be executed in the UK
- Ruth Ellis (activist) (1899–2000), American gay rights activist
- Ryan Ellis (disambiguation), multiple people

== S ==
- Samuel Ellis (disambiguation) or Sam/Sammy/Samuel, multiple people
- Sara L. Ellis (born 1969), American judge
- Sarah Ellis (author) (born 1952), Canadian author
- Sarah Kate Ellis (born 1971), American media executive
- Sarah Stickney Ellis (1799–1872), English writer
- Scott Ellis (disambiguation), multiple people
- Sedrick Ellis (born 1985), American football player
- Seger Ellis (1904–1995), American jazz pianist
- Shaun Ellis (born 1977), American football player
- Shaun Ellis English animal researcher
- Shirley Ellis (1929–2005), American soul singer
- Simon Ellis (disambiguation), multiple people
- Sophia Ellis (born 1996), British powerlifter
- Sophie Ellis-Bextor (born 1979), English singer and songwriter
- Stanley Ellis (disambiguation), multiple people
- Steven Ellis (disambiguation), multiple people

== T ==
- T. E. Ellis (1859–1899), Welsh politician
- T. S. Ellis III (1940–2025), American judge
- Ted Ellis (disambiguation), multiple people
- Terry Ellis (born 1963), American R&B singer
- Terry Ellis (music producer) (born 1943), English record producer
- Theodore T. Ellis (1867–1934), American inventor and publisher
- Thomas Ellis (disambiguation), multiple people
- Timo Ellis (born 1970), American musician and record producer
- Tino Ellis (born 1997), American football player
- Tinsley Ellis (born 1957), American blues/rock musician
- Todd Ellis (American football) (born 1967), American football player
- Todd Ellis (motorcyclist) (born 1994), English sidecar racer
- Tom Ellis (actor) (born 1979), Welsh actor
- Tom Ellis (politician) (1924–2010), British politician
- Tommy Ellis (born 1947), American NASCAR racing driver
- Tony Ellis (born 1964), English footballer

== V ==
- Vivian Ellis (1903–1996), English musical comedy composer

== W ==
- W. Ellis (MCC cricketer), English cricketer
- Walter Ellis (writer) (born 1946), Northern Irish writer
- Walter E. Ellis (1960–2013), American serial killer
- Warren Ellis (born 1968), English comic book author
- Warren Ellis (musician) (born 1965), Australian musician and composer
- Welbore Ellis (disambiguation), multiple people
- Wes Ellis (1932–1984), American golfer
- William Ellis (disambiguation), multiple people

== Z ==
- Zeph Ellis (1988–2026), British MC, rapper, singer, songwriter and record producer

== See also ==
- Elles
- Ellice (disambiguation)
- Ellis (given name)
- Elis (given name)
- Elis (surname)
- Elys (disambiguation), which includes people with the given name or surname
