= David Ellis =

David or Dave Ellis may refer to:

== Arts and entertainment ==
- David Ellis (scriptwriter) (1918–1978), British television series writer
- David Ellis (composer) (1933–2023), English composer and BBC producer
- David Ellis (biographer) (born 1939), writer of biographies of English authors
- David R. Ellis (1952–2013), American film director, actor and stuntman
- Dave Ellis (saxophonist), American jazz saxophonist

== Sports ==
- Dave Ellis (footballer) (1869–1940), Scottish international footballer
- David Ellis (Scottish footballer) (1900–?), Scottish footballer
- David Ellis (Australian footballer) (born 1949), Australian rules footballer
- David Ellis (Australian cricketer) (born 1951), Australian cricketer
- David Ellis (English cricketer) (born 1934), English cricketer
- Dave Ellis (runner) (1937–2026), Canadian Olympic athlete
- David Ellis (swimmer), British swimmer
- Dave Ellis (paratriathlete) (born 1986), British paratriathlete

== Other ==
- David Ellis (architect) (born 1953), Canadian architect
- David Ellis (botanist) (1874–1937), British botanist, bacteriologist and baker
- David Ellis (consultant) (born 1936), president of Lafayette College
- David Ellis (priest) (1736–1795), Welsh priest and poet
