= Robert Ellis =

Robert, Bob, Bobby, Rob or Robbie Ellis may refer to:

== Academics ==
- Robert Ellis (theologian) (born 1956), principal of Regent's Park College, Oxford
- Robert Ellis (classicist) (1820–1885), English classical scholar
- Robert Leslie Ellis (1817–1859), English mathematician and polymath
- Robert Ellis (mathematician) (1926–2013), American mathematician
- Robert Ellis (artist) (1929–2021), New Zealand artist and art professor
- Robert Ellis (physicist) (1927–1989), American physicist
- Robert Evan Ellis, professor of Latin American studies

== Actors ==
- Robert Ellis (actor, born 1892) (1892–1974), American film actor, screenwriter and film director
- Robert Ellis (actor, born 1933) (1933–1973), American child actor in the 1940s and 1950s

== Musicians ==
- Bobby Ellis (1932–2016), Jamaican trumpet player
- Rob Ellis (producer) (born 1962), English drummer, producer and arranger
- Rob Ellis, bass player for the American rock band Seven Wiser
- Robert Ellis (singer-songwriter) (born 1988), alt country music singer-songwriter
- Robert Ellis (musician), bass trombone player in the folk band La Bottine Souriante

== Politicians ==
- Robert Ellis (fl. 1406), Member of Parliament (MP) for Great Yarmouth in 1406
- Robert Ellis (fl. 1414-1422), MP for Great Yarmouth, son of earlier MP
- Sir Geoffrey Ellis, 1st Baronet (1874–1956), (Robert Geoffrey Ellis), British Conservative MP 1922–1923, 1924–1929, 1931–1945

== Sportsmen ==
- Rob Ellis (baseball) (born 1950), major league baseball outfielder in the 1970s
- Robert Ellis (baseball) (born 1970), major league baseball pitcher in the 1990s
- Robert Ellis (cricketer) (1853–1937), English cricketer
- Bob Ellis (cricketer) (born 1940), Scottish cricketer
- Robbie Ellis (1943–2025), American professional wrestler

== Writers ==
- Bob Ellis (1942–2016), Australian journalist
- Robert Ellis (author) (born 1954), American crime fiction writer

== Other ==
- Robert Ellis (24 character), fictional character in the television series 24
- Robert Ellis (clergyman) (1898–1966), minister with the Presbyterian Church of Wales
- Robert M. Ellis (1922–2014), American artist, educator, and museum director
- Robert Stanton Ellis (1825–1877), British civil servant of the Indian civil service
- Robert Ellis (Cynddelw) (1812–1875), minister and poet
- Robert Kevin Ellis (1954–2014), British businessman murdered in Bali
- Robert Ellis (animator), animator on series VeggieTales.

== See also ==
- Rob Elles (born 1951), British molecular geneticist
