= John Ellis =

John Ellis may refer to:

== Academics ==
- John Ellis (scrivener) (1698–1791), English political writer
- John Ellis (naturalist) (1710–1776), English botanical illustrator
- John Ellis (physicist, born 1946), British theoretical physicist at CERN
- John Millott Ellis (1831–1894), American abolitionist and President of Oberlin College
- R. John Ellis (born 1935), British biochemist
- Sir John Ellis (physician) (1916–1998), Dean London Hospital Medical College 1968–1980 medical educationalist
- John Ellis (media academic) (born 1952), British media theorist and TV producer
- John Ellis (physicist, born 1963), British physicist at the University of Cambridge

== Business ==
- Alfred John Ellis (1915–2020), Canadian banker
- John Ellis (businessman) (1789–1862), Director of the Midland Railway in the UK and MP for Leicester 1848–1852
- John Devonshire Ellis (1824–1906), English steelmaker
- John Prescott Ellis (born 1953), media consultant and first cousin of U.S. President George W. Bush
- Dr. John Ellis (Valvoline founder) (1815–1896), founder of the motor oil company, Valvoline

== Music ==
- John Ellis (guitarist) (born 1952), founding member of the 1970s punk band The Vibrators
- John Ellis (saxophonist) (born 1974), New Orleans jazz musician
- John Ellis, member of the South African band Tree63
- John Ellis, English pianist, composer, A founder member of The Cinematic Orchestra

== Politics ==
- John Ellis (MP for New Romney)
- John Ellis (Harwich MP) (1643–1738), English administrator and MP for Harwich 1702–08
- John Ellis (Newry MP) (1812–?), Irish Member of UK Parliament for Newry
- John Ellis (Mississippi politician) (d. 1808), territorial legislative council and Speaker of territorial house
- Sir John Whittaker Ellis (1829–1912), British Member of Parliament for Mid Surrey 1884–1885, Kingston 1885–1892
- John Ellis (Fianna Fáil politician) (born 1952), Irish Fianna Fáil politician
- John Ellis (Liberal politician) (1841–1910), British Liberal politician, MP for Rushcliffe 1885–1910
- John Ellis (pastoralist) (1803–1873), "Captain Ellis" South Australian grazier and MLC
- John Ellis (Australian politician) (1872–1945), Victorian state politician
- John Ellis (Labour politician) (1930–2019), British Labour Party politician, MP for Bristol North West and for Brigg and Scunthorpe
- John Valentine Ellis (1835–1913), Canadian MP and Senator
- John William Ellis (1853–1918), New Zealand businessman and mayor of Hamilton
- John Willis Ellis (1820–1861), North Carolina governor
- E. John Ellis (1840–1889), U.S. Representative from Louisiana
- John Ellis Martineau (1873–1937), governor of Arkansas then United States District Court judge
- Johnny Ellis (1960–2022), Democratic member of the Alaska Senate

== Religion ==
- John Ellis (theologian) (1606?–1681), English priest
- John Ellis (antiquarian) (1634–1735), Welsh priest, rector of Llanbedr-y-Cennin
- John Ellis (religious writer) (1598/99–1665), Welsh priest
- John Tracy Ellis (1905–1992), Catholic Church historian
- John Ellis (chaplain) (born 1963), Chaplain in Chief of the Royal Air Force

== Sports ==
=== Cricket ===
- John Ellis (English cricketer) (1864–1927), English cricketer
- John Ellis (Victoria cricketer) (1890–1974), Australian cricketer
- John Ellis (Queensland cricketer) (1914–1994), Australian cricketer

=== Other sports ===
- John Ellis (American football) (1919–2000), American football lineman
- John Ellis (baseball) (1948–2022), American baseball player
- John Ellis (footballer) (born 1948), Australian rules footballer
- John Ellis (golfer) (born 1979), American golfer
- Jonathan Ellis (wrestler) (born 1982), British professional wrestler

== Others ==
- John Ellis (executioner) (1874–1932), British executioner
- John Ellis (trade unionist) (1939–2011), British trade union leader
- John G. Ellis, English architect
- John R. Ellis, American visual effects artist
- J. Breckenridge Ellis (1870–1956), American writer

== See also ==
- John Allis (born 1942), American cyclist
- Jack Ellis (disambiguation)
- John Ellys (1701–1757), English portrait-painter
- John Ellys (Caius) (1634?–1716), English academic, Master of Gonville and Caius College, Cambridge from 1703
- John Scott-Ellis, 9th Baron Howard de Walden (1912–1999), British peer, landowner, and thoroughbred racehorse owner and breeder
