= Frank Ellis =

Frank Ellis may refer to:

- Frank Ellis (radiologist) (1905–2006), English scientist
- Frank Ellis (Ontario politician), Canadian politician
- Frank Ellis (actor) (1897–1969), American actor who appeared in King of the Congo and Two Tars
- Frank Ellis (lecturer), former Leeds University lecturer
- Frank Burton Ellis (1907–1969), U.S. federal judge
- Frank Ellis (footballer) (1883–1957), Australian rules footballer
- Frank H. Ellis (1896–1979), Canadian aviator and historian
- Frank Ellis (Indiana politician) (1842–1919), mayor of Muncie, Indiana
- Frank C. Ellis (1913–2002), American politician from Missouri
- Frank Ellis (coach), American football coach and college athletics administrator
- Frank Ellis (economist), British agrarian development economist

== See also ==
- Francis Ellis (disambiguation)
