= General Ellis =

General Ellis may refer to:

- Arthur Ellis (British Army officer) (1837–1907), British Army major general
- Fred E. Ellis (fl. 1960s–1990s), Texas Air National Guard major general
- Larry R. Ellis (born 1946), U.S. Army general
- Richard H. Ellis (1919–1989), U.S. Air Force general
- Samuel Burdon Ellis (1782–1865), Royal Marines general

== See also ==
- Charles Ellice (1823–1888), British Army general
- Robert Ellice (1784–1856), British Army general
- General Elles (disambiguation)
- Attorney General Ellis (disambiguation)
