= Ellys =

Ellys is a surname. Notable people with the surname include:

- Ellys baronets
- Anthony Ellys (1690–1761), English bishop
- Thomas Ellys (disambiguation), multiple people

== See also ==
- Ellis
