= Fred Ellis =

Fred or Frederick Ellis may refer to:

- Fred Ellis (boxer) (1908–1963), South African boxer
- Fred Ellis (cartoonist) (1885–1965), American cartoonist
- Fred Ellis (racing driver) (1889–1958), American racecar driver
- Fred Ellis (footballer) (1900–1970), English footballer
- Fred E. Ellis, American general
- Frederick M. Ellis (1906–1967), American athlete, coach, professor, head football coach at Tufts University (1946–1952)
- Frederick S. Ellis (1830–1880), Wisconsin politician
- Frederick Startridge Ellis (1830–1901), English bookseller and author
- Frederick Vincent Ellis (1892–1961), New Zealand artist and art teacher
- Frederick Ellis (priest) (fl. 1926–1965), Canadian Anglican priest and Dean of Nassau
- Frederick Ellis, 7th Baron Howard de Walden (1830–1899), British landowner and peer
