= Harry Ellis (disambiguation) =

Harry Ellis is a former rugby union player.

Harry Ellis may also refer to:

- Harry Ellis (athlete), participant in 2010 World Junior Championships in Athletics – Men's 1500 metres
- Harry Ellis (cricketer) (1878–1943), New Zealand cricketer
- Harry Ellis (golfer) (born 1995), English golfer
- Harry Ellis, character in Die Hard

== See also ==
- Harold Ellis (disambiguation)
- Henry Ellis (disambiguation)
