= Ellyse =

Ellyse is a given name. Notable people with the name include:

- Ellyse Gamble (born 1997), Australian rules footballer
- Ellyse Perry (born 1990), Australian cricketer

== See also ==
- Ellys
