= George Ellis =

George Ellis may refer to:

- George F. R. Ellis (born 1939), South African cosmologist and mathematician
- George Ellis (poet) (1753–1815), English poet
- George F. Ellis (1903–1972), American cattleman and author
- George Henry Ellis (1875–1898), U.S. Navy sailor during the Spanish–American War
- George R. Ellis (born 1937), author, art historian and director of the Honolulu Museum of Art
- George Edward Ellis (1814–1894), Unitarian clergyman and historian
- George Viner Ellis (1812–1900), British anatomist
- George Washington Ellis (1875–1919), African American attorney, writer, and speaker
- George Ellis (composer) (born 1964), Australian conductor and composer
- George Ellis (athlete) (1932–2023), English sprinter
- George Ellis (silversmith) (1863–1944), British silversmith
- George Ellis (American football official)

== See also ==
- George Agar-Ellis, 1st Baron Dover (1797–1833), English nobleman
- George Ellis Pugh, Democratic politician from Ohio
- Ellis (surname)
