= Kevin Ellis =

Kevin Ellis may refer to:

- Kevin Ellis (rugby) (born 1965), Welsh rugby league and rugby union footballer
- Sir Kevin Ellis (politician) (1908–1975), Liberal member of the New South Wales Legislative Assembly
- Kevin Ellis (skeleton racer) (born 1973), American skeleton racer
- Kevin Ellis (Australian rules footballer) (born 1944), Australian footballer
- Kevin Ellis (footballer, born 1977), English footballer
- Kevin Ellis (soccer, born 1991), American soccer player
- Kevin Ellis (True Blood)
