= Charles Ellis =

Charles Ellis may refer to:

- Charles Alton Ellis (1876–1949), senior engineer for the design of the Golden Gate Bridge
- Charles Ellis (soccer) (1890–1954), American soccer midfielder
- Charles Ellis, 1st Baron Seaford (1771–1845), British politician
- Charles Ellis, 6th Baron Howard de Walden (1799–1868), his son, British peer and politician
- Charles Drummond Ellis (1895–1980), British physicist and scientific administrator
- Dick Ellis (Charles Howard Ellis, 1895–1975), Australian soldier and intelligence officer
- Charlie Ellis (1875–?), Australian rugby union player
- Charles H. Ellis III (born 1958), American preacher
- Charles D. Ellis (born 1937), American investment consultant
- Charles Ellis (cricketer, born 1830) (1830–1880), English cricketer
- Charles Ellis (cricketer, born 1815), English cricketer
- Charles Ellis Johnson (1857–1926), American photographer
- Charley Ellis (1944–2018), American boxer
- Chuck Ellis, American songwriter, vocalist and music producer
