= 1698 in poetry =

This article covers 1698 in poetry. Nationality words link to articles with information on the nation's poetry or literature (for instance, Irish or France).

== Works ==
- Aphra Behn – Poetical Remains
- John Hopkins
  - The Triumphs of Peace, or the Glories of Nassau ... written at the time of his Grace the Duke of Ormond's entrance into Dublin
  - The Victory of Death; or the Fall of Beauty

== Births ==
Death years link to the corresponding "[year] in poetry" article:

- January 3 – Metastasio, born Pietro Antonio Domenico Trapassi (died 1782), Italian poet and opera librettist
- January 10? – Richard Savage (died 1743), English poet
- March 22 – John Ellis (died 1791), English scrivener and poet
- May 8 – Henry Baker (died 1774), English naturalist, poet and sign-language developer
- July 19 – Johann Jakob Bodmer (died 1783), German-language Swiss, author, critic, academic and poet
- Approximate date – Alasdair mac Mhaighstir Alasdair (died 1770), Scottish Gaelic poet

== Deaths ==
Birth years link to the corresponding "[year] in poetry" article:

- January – Dáibhí Ó Bruadair (born 1625), Irish language poet
- February 28 – Nicolò Minato (born 1627), Italian poet, librettist and impresario
- September 3 – Sir Robert Howard (born 1626), English playwright, poet and brother-in-law of John Dryden

== See also ==
- List of years in poetry
- List of years in literature
- 17th century in poetry
- 17th century in literature
- Poetry
