= The Faith of Christopher Hitchens =

2016 book by Larry Taunton

The Faith of Christopher Hitchens: The Restless Soul of the World’s Most Notorious Atheist
- Author: Larry Taunton
- Language: English
- Published: Nashville, Kentucky
- Publisher: Thomas Nelson
- Publication date: 2016
- Publication place: United States
- ISBN: 978-0-7180-8112-6
- Dewey Decimal: 211.8092

The Faith of Christopher Hitchens: The Restless Soul of the World’s Most Notorious Atheist is a 2016 book by American author and evangelist Larry Taunton.

== Background and synopsis ==
Taunton, the Executive Director of Fixed Point Foundation, a non-profit organisation dedicated to defence of the Christian faith, claims he was a friend of the author, columnist, essayist, orator, religious and social critic and journalist Christopher Hitchens. Hitchens was a strong critic of religion and a proponent of atheism. The book "traces Hitchens spiritual and intellectual development" and includes claims that Hitchens flirted with Christianity after his diagnosis with terminal cancer and stared "into the depths of eternity, teetering on the edge of belief" and "was wading into Christian waters, getting more than his feet wet".

== Reception ==
Taunton's book attracted some media attention and Taunton was interviewed on Newsnight on BBC Two alongside Lawrence Krauss who strongly criticised the book and alleged Taunton was a "paid associate" and not a friend of Hitchens. He also suggested Hitchens' widow was "disgusted" by the book. The Faith of Christopher Hitchens received a mixed critical reception. Nick Cohen, a friend of Hitchens, was strongly critical of the book in The Guardian. Cohen described it as "strange, spiteful", the "work of a true fanatic". Cohen is critical of the several attacks made by Taunton on friends of Hitchens. Cohen also wrote that "In a section that is tasteless even by his low standards, he ridicules Christopher’s father, Eric, as a weak man, because his failure to discipline his children 'contributed to his son’s unbelief'" and wrote that the "willingness of believers to go further and invent conversions where none existed satisfies their infantile need for fairytale endings...they move from the extremely seedy to the outright creepy: from vultures to vampires".

Also in The Guardian Matthew d'Ancona depicted the book as "meretricious" and as the latest example of falsified deathbed conversion stories. He also wrote that whilst it is "tempting to write off this book as outburst of epic self-deception" d'Ancona wrote that "its craven purpose – to claim Hitchens posthumously for evangelical Christianity – is to defame a man who was a champion of the Enlightenment" and an enemy of all religion. David Frum, writing in The Atlantic, stated that "In the months before he died, Hitchens repeatedly and emphatically warned that claims like Taunton’s would be forthcoming and should be disbelieved." and that "Taunton mistakes curiosity for assent"

The book was praised in religious publications, such as Books & Culture. Douglas Wilson described the book as "simply outstanding" and praised Taunton for making his case "superbly". The Christian Post alleged that Hitchens "was contemplating conversion to evangelical Christianity". Publishers Weekly praised the "smooth and accessible prose".
