= Edwin Ellis =

Edwin Ellis may refer to:

- Edwin Ellis (poet) (1848–1916), British poet and illustrator
- Edwin Ellis (artist) (1842–1895), English artist
- Edwin Ellis (musician) (1844–1878), English musician
- Edwin E. Ellis (1924–1989), American inventor and photographer
- Jack Ellis (rugby league), born Edwin Horace Ellis, New Zealand rugby league player

== See also ==
- E. Earle Ellis (Edward Earle Ellis, 1926–2010), American biblical scholar
