= Michael Ellis =

Michael or Mike Ellis may refer to:

- Michael Ellis (British politician) (born 1967), British Conservative Member of Parliament for Northampton North
- Michael B. Ellis (1894–1937), American soldier and Medal of Honor recipient
- Mike Ellis (athlete) (born 1936), English hammer thrower
- Mike Ellis (basketball) (born 1958), Australian basketball player
- Mike Ellis (Canadian politician) (born 1973), Canadian provincial politician
- Mike Ellis (South African politician) (born 1946), deputy chief whip of the Democratic Alliance
- Mike Ellis, Co-Founder of Channel Awesome
- Michael Ellis (American politician) (1941–2018), member of the Wisconsin Senate
- Michael J. Ellis, British playwright and scriptwriter
- Michael Ellis (designer) (born 1962), American transportation designer
- "Michael Ellis" (Monty Python's Flying Circus episode), episode of British TV series Monty Python's Flying Circus
- Michael Ellis (bishop) (1652–1726), English Benedictine
- Michael Ellis (attorney), assistant White House counsel
- Michael Ellis, founder of the defunct multi-level marketing company Metabolife
- "Michael Ellis", a pseudonym used by J. M. DeMatteis
- Michael Ellis, the voice of Zozobra in 1994 and from 2014 to 2019
