= Frampton Ellis =

Frampton Ellis is an American footwear designer, inventor, researcher, and author.

== Career ==
Ellis was born and raised in Maryland and attended Duke University. Upon graduation, Ellis served six years in the U.S Naval Reserve, including as navigator of the guided missile destroyer USS Towers (DDG-9). In 1992, Ellis founded Anatomic Research, a company focused on anatomical and biomechanical research related to athletic footwear design and development that reduces injury.

Ellis is credited with inventing the patented barefoot sole-based technology licensed by Adidas for its Feet You Wear (FYW). line of footwear. He is also recognized as the inventor of the siped sole technology used in the Nike Free line of footwear. In 1994, Ellis entered into a patent licensing agreement with Adidas for his barefoot-inspired sole technology. Adidas subsequently branded their development of the technology as Feet You Wear (FYW), which was integrated into a broad range of Adidas shoe models between 1996 and 2001.

Ellis holds more than two hundred U.S. utility and design patents across diverse technological fields, with a strong focus on footwear soles. He has been awarded a patent on an artificial intelligence (AI) cloud-based system designed to connect with sensor-equipped and configurable footwear soles connected to smartphones. Ellis has conducted extensive investigative research and published two books on the serious injuries caused by footwear and the potential means for the footwear industry to prevent them using open technologies, including publication in the leading scientific journal, Footwear Science.
