= Richard Ellis =

Richard Ellis may refer to:

== Academics ==
- Richard Ellis (astronomer) (born 1950), Welsh, astronomer, Caltech professor and former director of Palomar Observatory
- Richard Ellis (biologist) (1938–2024), American marine biologist, author, and illustrator
- Richard Ellis (librarian) (1865–1928), Welsh librarian and scholar
- Richard S. Ellis (1947–2018), American mathematician
- Richard Ellis (paediatrician) (1902–1966), British paediatrician
- R. Keith Ellis (born 1949), British theoretical physicist

== Politicians ==
- Richard Ellis (Texas politician) (1781–1846), Texas legislator
- Richard Ellis (MP), in 1417 and 1421, MP for Great Yarmouth
- Richard Ellis (Massachusetts politician), 17th century representative to the Great and General Court
- Richard Ellis (Dedham), 19th century representative to the Great and General Court

== Other people ==
- Richard Ellis (English cricketer) (born 1960), former English cricketer
- Richard Ellis (New Zealand cricketer) (born 1945), New Zealand cricketer
- Richard Ellis (journalist), British former editor of the Sunday Telegraph
- Richard H. Ellis (1919–1989), U.S. Air Force general and former Strategic Air Command commander
- Richard Ellis (American photographer) (born 1960), news photographer and founder of the photo agency Newsmakers
- Richard Ellis (Maltese photographer) (1842–1924), British-Maltese photographer
- Richard Ellis (mayor) (1820–1895), English builder, property developer, alderman, mayor, and public benefactor
- Richard Ellis (Mississippi planter) (1732–1792), Anglo-American settler

== Other uses ==
- Richard Ellis International Limited, now part of CBRE Group, real estate company

== See also ==
- Sir Richard Ellys, 3rd Baronet, English politician, bibliophile and theological writer
- Rick Ellis (disambiguation)
- Dick Ellis (1895–1975), British intelligence officer
- Rick Elice (born 1956), writer
