= Jack Ellis =

Jack Ellis may refer to:

- Jack Ellis (rugby league), (1899–1964) New Zealand rugby league player
- Jack Ellis (footballer, born 1908) (1908–1994), English footballer
- Jack Ellis (rugby union) (1912–2007), English rugby player
- Jack Ellis (politician) (1929–1994), Canadian politician
- Jack Ellis (Australian footballer) (born 1933), Australian rules footballer
- C. Jack Ellis (born 1946), mayor of Macon, Georgia
- Jack Ellis (actor) (born 1955), British television actor
- Jack Ellis (writer) (born 1978), Australian writer
- Jack Ellis (footballer, born 2003), English footballer

== See also ==
- John Ellis (disambiguation)
