= Jim Ellis =

Jim Ellis may refer to:

- Jim Ellis (jockey) (1910–1971), New Zealand jockey and racehorse trainer
- James L. Ellis (1928–2017), California state legislator
- Jim Ellis (baseball) (born 1945), former Major League Baseball pitcher
- Jim Ellis (swimming coach) (born 1948), American swim coach and subject of the film Pride
- Jim Ellis (computing) (1956–2001), American computer scientist
- Jim Ellis (lobbyist) (fl. 2000), American Republican activist
- Jim Ellis (King County activist) (1921–2019), American civic activist
- Jim Ellis (American football) (born 1964), American professional football player and boxer

== See also ==
- James Ellis (disambiguation)
- Jimmy Ellis (disambiguation)
