= Ronald Ellis =

Ronald or Ron Ellis may refer to:

- Ronald W. Ellis (born 1960), American racehorse trainer
- Ronald Ellis (politician) (born 1952), member of the Kansas House of Representatives
- Ron Ellis (1945–2024), retired Canadian professional ice hockey player
- Ron Ellis (basketball) (born 1968), American/Belgian basketball player
- Ron Ellis (filmmaker), filmmaker known for his work dealing with intellectual disability
- Ron Ellis (author) (born 1941), British crime novelist, broadcaster and journalist
- Ron Ellis (footballer) (1915–2008), Australian rules footballer
