= Francis Ellis =

Francis Ellis may refer to:

- Francis Ellis (colonial administrator), administrator of the English East India Company
- Francis Ellis (comedian) (1989), comedian and podcaster
- Francis Ellis (cricketer) (1889–?), English cricketer
- Francis Whyte Ellis (1777–1819), British civil servant and scholar of Tamil and Sanskrit

== See also ==
- Frank Ellis (disambiguation)
