= Jeff Ellis =

Jeff, Geoff or Geoffrey Ellis may refer to:

- Jeff Ellis (plant scientist) (born 1953), Australian plant scientist
- Sir Geoffrey Ellis, 1st Baronet (1874–1956), British politician
- Geoff Ellis (born 1950), Welsh cricketer
- Jeff Ellis (recording engineer) (born 1984), American recording engineer
