= James Ellis =

James Ellis may refer to:

== Arts and entertainment ==
- James G. Ellis (composer) (1880–1966), American violinist, silent film theater pioneer, and composer
- James Ellis (actor) (1931–2014), British actor
- Orion (singer) (James Hodges Ellis, 1945–1998), American singer
- James Ellis (musician) (fl. 2005–2007), British rock guitarist and record producer

== Politics and law ==
- James Ellis (antiquary) (1763–1830), English lawyer and antiquary
- James Ellis (British politician) (1829–1901), British MP for Bosworth 1885–1892
- James Ellis (Australian politician) (1843–1930), Australian politician
- James A. Ellis (1864–1934), mayor of Ottawa
- James F. Ellis (1870–1937), Canadian physician and politician
- James M. Ellis (fl. 1920s), lawyer and state legislator in West Virginia
- James L. Ellis, (1928–2017), California state legislator

== Others ==
- James Ellis (footballer) (fl. 1892), Scottish footballer
- Mooney Ellis (James Ellis, 1896–unknown), American baseball player
- James H. Ellis (1924–1997), British engineer and cryptographer
- James G. Ellis (born 1947), American academic; dean of the Marshall School of Business at the University of Southern California
- James O. Ellis (born 1947), U.S. Navy admiral

== See also ==
- Jim Ellis (disambiguation)
- Jimmy Ellis (disambiguation)
