= Frederick Ellis (priest) =

Frederick Eveleigh Ellis
- Predecessor: Eric Jay
- Successor: Thomas Leslie Weatherhead

Orders
- Ordination: 1926

Personal details
- Education: University of Toronto

Frederick Eveleigh Ellis was Dean of Nassau from 1952 to 1965.

Ellis was educated at Wycliffe College, Toronto and ordained in 1926. After a curacy in Douglas, Ontario he held incumbencies at Chalk River, Woodside and Halifax.
