= Sherifa Zuhur =

American academic

Sherifa D. Zuhur is an academic and national security scholar of the Middle East and Islamic world. She was most recently a visiting scholar at the Center for Middle East Studies, University of California, Berkeley and is the director of the Institute of Middle Eastern, Islamic and Strategic Studies.

== Career ==
Her most recent book on the arts is Popular Dance and Music in Modern Egypt a unique survey and analysis of Egypt's many dance and musical genres. She previously wrote, Conflicting Interests in Egypt: Political, Business, Religious, Gender, Popular Culture co-authored with Marlyn Tadros (Lewiston, New York: Edwin Mellen Press: 2017). as well as a monograph on the political situation in Mubarak's Egypt, a book on the rise of Islamism in Egypt and its impact on women and many other studies of issues in Egypt and other Middle Eastern countries. She published an extended opinion piece on the case of Sirhan Sirhan on the 50th anniversary of the assassination of Robert F. Kennedy.

Zuhur was a distinguished visiting professor of national security studies from 2004 to 2006, then research professor of Islamic and regional studies from 2006 to 2009 at the U.S. Army War College's Strategic Studies Institute. International Fellows who studied with her there included Egyptian field marshal Abdel Fattah el-Sisi; General Sedki Sobhi, Egypt's former minister of defense; and Taysir Abdullah Saleh, defense attache at the Embassy of Yemen and nephew of the late president Saleh.

She has also held faculty positions at the American University in Cairo, Massachusetts Institute of Technology, University of California, Berkeley, Ben Gurion University of the Negev, California State University Sacramento, and Cleveland State University.

Zuhur has contributed to governmental and defense studies work groups, a NATO counterterrorism work group, a commission on Yemen, legal rights reforms, and other efforts on numerous subjects including women's legal rights, including counterterrorism and Islamic movements in Egypt, Saudi Arabia, Syria, Iraq, Lebanon, the West Bank, Libya, Yemen, Morocco, and Gaza. She has also contributed to research and legal rights work groups on human and women's rights.

She is a past president of the Association of Middle East Women's Studies.

Zuhur has been an advocate for legal reforms to benefit women in the region.

== Works ==
Zuhur's scholarship includes:

- Popular Dance and Music in Modern Egypt. McFarland. 2022.
- Egypt's Conflicting Interests since 2011: Political, Business, Religious, Social and Popular Culture. Co-authored with Marlyn Tadros. Lewiston, New York: Edwin Mellen Press.
- Saudi Arabia. ABC-Clio.
- “Egypt’s Revolution Reshapes Women’s Rights Advocates and their Aims.” In Minorities, Women and the State in North Africa. Red Sea Press.
- “The Syrian Revolution’s Shifting Landscape.” In Businessmen in Arms in the Middle East. Rowman and Littlefield.
- “The Master, the Pir and their Followers in Diaspora: Gülen’s Followers (Hizmet) and the Maktab Tarigha Oveyssi Shahmaghsoudi,” In New Horizons of Muslim Diaspora in Europe and North America. Palgrave Macmillan.
- “Shiite Women in the Eastern Beqaa Valley.” In "In Line with the Divine": The Struggle for Gender Equality in Lebanon. Abelian Group.
- “Women’s Quest for Equality in Post-Revolutionary Egypt.” In Women's Movements and Counter Movements: The Quest for Gender Equality in Southeast Asia and the Middle East. Cambridge Scholars.
- “Claiming Space for Minorities in Egypt after the Arab Spring.” In Multiculturalism and Democracy in North Africa. Routledge.
- “Strategy in the Battle over ‘Her’: Islamism and Secularism.” In Gender and Violence in the Middle East. Routledge.
- “Decreasing Violence in Saudi Arabia and Beyond.” In Home Grown Terrorism: Understanding and Addressing the Root Causes of Radicalisation among Groups with an Immigrant Heritage in Europe. IOS Press.
- “An Intercultural Approach to the Issue of Islamic Extremism,” in Portuguese in Podemos Viver Sem O Outro? and in English, Can We Live Without the Other? Arcata.
- “Quosque Tandem State Terror?” For Rand/USAF Air Research Laboratory and Multi-Agency White Paper on Deradicalization and Transforming Islamic Extremism, 2012.
- “Ideological Basis for Islamic Radicalism and Implications for Deradicalization.”
- Asrar Asmahan. (Arabic)Dar al-Mada and Dar Madbouli.
- Hamas and Israel: Strategic Interaction in Group-Based Politics, SSI.
- Precision in the Global War on Terror: Inciting Muslims through the War of Ideas. SSI.
- Egypt: Security, Political, and Islamist Challenges. SSI.
- Iraq, Women's Empowerment, and Public Policy. SSI
- Iraq, Iran and the United States: The New Triangle's Impact on Sectarianism and the Nuclear Threat. SSI
- A Hundred Osamas and The Future of Counterinsurgency. SSI
- Saudi Arabia: Islamism, Political Reform and the Global War on Terror. SSI.
- “State Power and the Progress of Militant and Moderate Islamism in Egypt” In Countering Terrorism and Insurgency in the 21st Century, Vol. III. Praeger Security Internat'l.
- “Nationalism, Insurgency, and Reconstruction in Iraq.” In Nationalisms Across the Globe: An Overview of the Nationalisms of State-Endowed and Stateless Nations. Vol. II
- “Syria: Haven for Terrorists?” and “A New Future for Jihad in Egypt?” In Unmasking Terror: A Global Review of Terrorist Activities. Jamestown.
- “Criminal Law, Women, and Sexuality in the Middle East.” In Women and Sexuality in the Middle East.
- The Middle East: Politics, History and Neonationalism. IMEIDS.
- Islamic Rulings on Warfare with LCDR Youssef Aboul-Enein. SSI
- Gender, Sexuality and the Criminal Laws in Middle East and North Africa: A Comparative Study. KKH/WWHR.
- Women and Gender in the Middle East and the Islamic World Today. UCP.
- Colors of Enchantment: Visual and Performing Arts of the Middle East. AUCP.
- Asmahan's Secrets: Woman, War and Song. U of T Press and Al-Saqi.
- Images of Enchantment: Visual and Performing Arts of the Middle East. AUCP.
- Revealing Reveiling: Islamist Gender Ideology in Contemporary Egypt. SUNY.
- Encyclopedia of the Arab-Israeli Conflict (assistant editor)
- Middle East Wars: Academic Version, Persian Gulf, Afghanistan, Iraq. (assistant editor)
