= General Elles =

General Elles may refer to:

- Edmond Elles (1848–1934), British Army lieutenant general
- Hugh Elles (1880–1945), British Army lieutenant general
- William Elles (1837–1896), British Army lieutenant general

== See also ==
- General Ellis (disambiguation)
