= Harold Ellis =

Harold Ellis may refer to:

- Harold Ellis (basketball) (born 1970), American basketball player
- Harold Ellis (cricketer) (1883–1962), English cricketer
- Harold Ellis (surgeon) (1926–2026), British surgeon

== See also ==
- Harry Ellis (disambiguation)
