= Leonard Wong =

- Born: 30 December 1958 (age 67); New York, U.S.
- Military career
- Allegiance: United States of America
- Branch: United States Army
- Service years: 1980–2000
- Rank: Lieutenant Colonel
- Other work: Instructor United States Military Academy, Strategic Studies Institute researcher

Leonard Wong (born 30 December 1958) is a Research Professor of Military Strategy (Human and Organizational Dimensions) in the Strategic Studies Institute at the U.S. Army War College, who focuses on the human and organizational dimensions of the military, and is a published author on leadership strategy.

== Work ==
Wong was born in New York State and raised in Pennsylvania. He is a registered professional engineer and holds a Bachelor of Science from the United States Military Academy in 1980, and an M.S.B.A. and Ph.D. from Texas Tech University. His 1992 doctoral thesis was on The effects of cohesion on organizational performance: a test of two models using performance data of unit battles at the U.S. Army's National Training Center, Fort Irwin, California. Wong joined the Strategic Studies Institute in July 2000 after serving 20 years in the United States Army, reaching the rank of lieutenant colonel. His army career included assignments teaching leadership at West Point, serving as an analyst in the Office of the Chief of Staff of the United States Army and in the Office of the Deputy Chief of Staff for Personnel, and serving as the Director of the Office of Economic and Manpower Analysis (OEMA). He has authored several articles, chapters, and papers on organizational issues in the Army such as downsizing, leadership, junior officer retention, professionalism, and innovation in the military.

His published research has led him to locations such as Iraq, Afghanistan, Kosovo, Bosnia, and Vietnam and has been highlighted in media such as The New York Times, The Wall Street Journal, Washington Post, The New Yorker, CNN, NPR, PBS, and 60 Minutes.

== Published works ==
- Wong, Leonard; Hunt, James G.; Dodge, George E. (1999) Out of the Box Leadership: Transforming the Twenty-First Century Army and Other Top Performing Organizations. Stamford, CT: Jai Press. ISBN 0-7623-0548-7
- Wong, Leonard (2000) Generations Apart: Xers and Boomers in the Officer Corps. Carlisle, PA: Strategic Studies Institute, U.S. Army War College. ISBN 1-58487-038-9
- Wong, Leonard; Struop, Theodore G. (2000) 'Re-establishing the force: the revolution in military affairs in the human resource and leadership systems', in Stuart A. Cohen (ed.) Democratic Societies and Their Armed Forces: Israel in Comparative Context. London : Portland, OR: Frank Cass. ISBN 0-7146-5038-2
- Wong, Leonard (2001) Maintaining Public Support for Military Operations. Carlisle, PA: Strategic Studies Institute, U.S. Army War College. OCLC 48769331
- Wong, Leonard (2002) Moral Dimensions of American Military Strategy: U.S. Army War College 13th Annual Strategy Conference. Carlisle Barracks, PA: Strategic Studies Institute, U.S. Army War College. OCLC 50297019
- Wong, Leonard (2002) Stifled Innovation?: Developing Tomorrow's Leaders Today. Carlisle, PA: Strategic Studies Institute, U.S. Army War College. ISBN 1-58487-064-8
- Wong, Leonard (2003) Why They fight: Combat Motivation in the Iraq War. Carlisle, PA: Strategic Studies Institute, U.S. Army War College. ISBN 1-58487-133-4
- Wong, Leonard (2003) Developing Adaptive Leaders: the Crucible Experience of Operation Iraqi Freedom. Carlisle Barracks, PA: Strategic Studies Institute, U.S. Army War College. ISBN 1-58487-167-9
- Wong, Leonard (2003) Strategic Leadership Competencies. Carlisle Barracks, PA: Strategic Studies Institute, U.S. Army War College. OCLC 56390032
- Wong, Leonard; Bliese, Paul; Mcgurk, Dennis (2003) 'Military Leadership: A Context Specific Review', in The Leadership Quarterly 14, no. 6: 657.
- Wong, Leonard; Lovelace, Douglas C. (2004) Homeland Security and Civil Liberties. Carlisle Barracks, PA: Strategic Studies Institute, U.S. Army War College. OCLC 56124189
- Wong, Leonard (2005) 'Leave No Man Behind: Recovering America's Fallen Warriors' in Armed Forces & Society, 31, no. 4: 600-622. ISSN 0095-327X
- Wong, Leonard (2006) CU @ the FOB: How the Forward Operating Base is Changing the Life of Combat Soldiers. Carlisle Barracks, PA: Strategic Studies Institute, U.S. Army War College. ISBN 1-58487-237-3
- Wong, Leonard; Lovelace, Douglas (2007) Knowing When to Salute. Fort Belvoir, VA: Defense Technical Information Center. OCLC 227939975
- Wong, Leonard (2008) Civil-Military Relations in a Post-9/11 World. Carlisle Barracks, PA: Strategic Studies Institute, U.S. Army War College. OCLC 247106507
- Wong, Leonard (2010) 'The officer corps in the all-volunteer army: the American experiment continues', in Stuart A. Cohen (ed.) The New Citizen Armies: Israel's Armed Forces in Comparative Perspective, Milton Park, Abingdon, Oxon; New York, NY: Routledge. ISBN 978-0-415-56546-2
