= Larry Taunton =

American author and commentator

- Born: May 24, 1967 (age 59)
- Occupations: Author, public speaker
- Writing career
- Genre: Christian spirituality history
- Website: www.larryalextaunton.com

Larry Alex Taunton (born May 24, 1967) is an American author, columnist, and cultural commentator. Larry Taunton's work has been covered by the BBC, The New York Times, and many others.

== Career ==
Larry Taunton has personally engaged some of the most outspoken opponents of Christianity, including Richard Dawkins, Christopher Hitchens, and Peter Singer. In 2007, he organized "The God Delusion Debate" between Dawkins and Christian apologist John Lennox concerning Dawkins' arguments against Christianity as set forth in his bestselling book, The God Delusion. The discussion was heard by over a million people worldwide. In 2008, he chaired a follow-up debate at the University of Oxford. In 2010, Taunton publicly debated Christopher Hitchens. In 2015, he debated atheist Daniel Dennett and imam Zaid Shakir on Al Jazeera America, as well as skeptic writer Michael Shermer. He has also been a guest on a variety of television and radio shows, and has been quoted by the New York Times and Vanity Fair, among other newspapers and magazines.

When not writing, teaching, or producing, Taunton travels widely, speaking on issues of faith and culture.

He published the 2016 book The Faith of Christopher Hitchens, about his friendship with the late atheist, in which he claimed that Hitchens seemed to be re-evaluating his religious options, "if only theoretically," after his cancer diagnosis. Taunton clarifies that such musings were no deathbed conversion: "I make no Lady Hope-like claims regarding Christopher Hitchens. As we have seen, there were no reports of a deathbed conversion."

Taunton published the 2020 book Around the World in (More Than) 80 Days, about his time spent in other countries, and contrasting those experiences with America. His writing frequently promote the Cultural Marxism conspiracy theory.

== Personal life ==
Taunton was born at Fort Benning, Georgia. He and his wife, Lauri, have four children and live in Birmingham, Alabama.

In October 2015, Taunton was nearly fatally injured when hit while cycling, suffering 39 broken bones including a skull fracture, his jaw, 19 breaks in his neck and back, all ribs on the right side of his body, and a punctured lung and massive internal hemorrhaging.

In the fall of 2017, Taunton resigned as the executive director of Fixed Point Foundation citing a lack of recovery since his injury and manic pace of work. In 2018, Taunton admitted that he "had engaged in inappropriate (consensual) behavior outside the bonds of my marriage some time ago" for which he received "marriage and personal counseling," without publicly offering details of the timeline in which these event occurred. His resignation came "after he was confronted about allegations that he had inappropriate relationships with two young women on the ministry staff."

In September 2019, the board of Fixed Point Foundation unanimously reinstated Taunton as executive director, stating, "Larry accomplished more than most of us thought possible, often at great personal risk and sacrifice. It is not wholly uncommon for people in high profile work to suffer their own setbacks, and Larry did. But he faced it with courage and dignity and he has done all that we have asked of him and more these last two years. Furthermore, it has become clear to us that God’s call upon his life is unchanged.". The letter did not discuss additional details surrounding Taunton's prior resignation or Fixed Point Foundation's future work. Although several members of the board of Fixed Point Foundation had resigned between 2015 and 2018, the letter was signed by "a founding member of the Fixed Point Foundation Board in 2003."

== Published works ==
- The Grace Effect: How the Power of One Life Can Reverse the Corruption of Unbelief, 2011 (Thomas Nelson) ISBN 1-59555440-8
- The Faith of Christopher Hitchens: The Restless Soul of the World's Most Notorious Atheist, 2016 (Thomas Nelson) ISBN 0-71802217-3
- Around the World in (More Than) 80 Days: Discovering What Makes America Great and Why We Must Fight to Save It, 2020 (Fidelis Books) ISBN 1-64293592-1
