= Jerry Ellis =

Jerry Ellis may refer to:

- Jerry Ellis (author) (born 1947), American author
- Jerry Ellis (Oklahoma politician) (born 1946), Oklahoma State Senator
- Jerry Ellis (Washington politician), Washington State Representative
- Jerry Ellis, founder of Building 19, a chain of discount stores in New England

== See also ==
- Gerry Ellis (born 1957), American football player
