= Strategic Research and Assessment Department =

U.S. Army research institute

Coordinates: 40.210936°N 77.175311°W

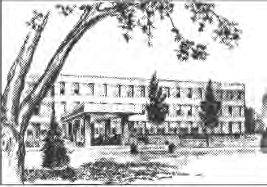
- Abbreviation: SRAD
- Predecessor: Strategic Studies Institute (SSI)
- Founder: U.S. Army War College
- Founded at: Carlisle Barracks, Pennsylvania
- Location: Pennsylvania
- Website: www.strategicstudiesinstitute.army.mil

The Strategic Research and Assessment Department (SRAD) is responsible for educating senior leaders at the operational and strategic levels. It is part of the U.S. Army War College. SRAD conducts strategic research and analysis to support the U.S. Army War College curricula, provides direct analysis for Army and Department of Defense leadership, and serves as a bridge to the wider strategic community. It is located at Carlisle Barracks, Pennsylvania.

== Organization ==
SRAD is composed of civilian research professors, uniformed military officers, and a professional support staff. SRAD is divided into three components: the Department of Research, the US Army War College Fellowship Program (USAWCFP) and the US Army War College Press. SRAD also has partnerships with strategic analysts, including in the field of security and military strategy.

== Products ==
SRAD and US Army War College Press publish studies, which are distributed to strategic leaders in the Army and Department of Defense, the military educational system, US Congress, the media, other think tanks and defense institutes, and colleges and universities. SRAD studies use history and current political, economic, and military factors to develop strategic recommendations. These studies often influence the formulation of U.S. military strategy, national security policy, and even the strategies of allies and friends. SRAD analysts have contributed to major U.S. national security strategy documents and to U.S. Army doctrine. The U.S. Army War College also hosts a major annual strategy conference at Carlisle Barracks.

Parameters is a security journal, serving as a forum for thoughts on the art and science of land warfare, joint and combined matters, national and international security affairs, military strategy, military leadership and management, military history, ethics, and other topics of significant and current interest to the US Army and Department of Defense. It serves as a vehicle for continuing the education and professional development of USAWC graduates and other senior military officials, as well as members of government and academia concerned with national security affairs.

== Staff ==
The current director is C. Anthony "Tony" Pfaff. Tom Kardos is deputy director.

National security experts such as Harry Summers, Sherifa Zuhur, Jeffrey Record, Phil Williams, Sheila Jager, Robert (Robin) Dorff, Douglas MacDonald, Thomas-Durrell Young, Andrew Scobell, Cori Dauber, Dallas Owens, and Stephen Biddle have been faculty members or associated with SRAD in the past. Strategic thinkers such as Michael Howard, Colin Gray, Daniel Byman, Thomas Marks, Dennis Ippolito, Amit Gupta, Leonid I. Polyakov, Williamson Murray, John White, John Deutch, Steven Metz, and Eliot Cohen have written SRAD studies.

SRAD's analytical staff includes Don Snider, Trey Braun, John Deni, Leonard Wong, Tony Pfaff, Chris Bolan, Chris Mason, Nate Freier and Robert Evan Ellis. In addition to their work for SRAD, the institute's staff analysts are well-known experts in their fields with multiple publications, congressional testimony, and many media interviews.
