= Elles =

Elles is a surname, and may refer to:

- Bertram Walter Elles (1877–1963), British colonial civil servant
- Diana Elles, Baroness Elles (1921–2009), British lawyer and peer
- Sir Edmond Elles (1848–1934), British Army lieutenant general
- Gertrude Elles (1872–1960), British geologist
- Sir Hugh Elles (1880–1945), British Army lieutenant general, son of Sir Edmond Elles
- James Elles (born 1949), British politician
- Wilma Elles (born 1986), German actress

== See also ==
- Elles (film), a French film from 2011
- Women (1997 film), a 1997 film
- Ellis
- Elles (series), an 1896 lithographic portfolio by Henri de Toulouse-Lautrec
- Elles, one of the French personal pronouns
- Elles, the plural for Elle (Spanish pronoun)
