= Kevin Ellis (skeleton racer) =

American skeleton racer (born 1973)

Kevin Ellis (born June 29, 1973) is an American skeleton racer who competed from 1999 to 2006. He finished 17th in the men's skeleton event at the 2006 Winter Olympics in Turin.

Ellis also finished sixth in the men's skeleton at the 2003 FIBT World Championships in Nagano.

Prior to competing in skeleton, Ellis competed for Stephen F. Austin State University in athletics. He is also an accountant in Dallas, Texas

== Athletic results ==
Header Date	Header Place	Header Competition Type	Header Track
02/04/2009	4	North American Cup	Lake Placid
21/12/2008	7	Europe Cup	Innsbrunk
20/12/2008	1	Europe Cup	Innsbrunk
08/11/2008	1	North American Cup	Lake Placid
07/11/2008	1	North American Cup	Lake Placid
05/04/2008	13	North American Cup	Lake Placid
18/02/2006	17	Olympic Winter Games	Cesana Pariol
27/01/2006	6	BMW IBSF World Cup	Altenberg
19/01/2006	4	BMW IBSF World Cup	St. Moritz
12/01/2005	32	BMW IBSF World Cup	Königssee
15/12/2005	14	BMW IBSF World Cup	Sigulda
09/12/2005	2	BMW IBSF World Cup	Nagano
17/11/2005	9	BMW IBSF World Cup	Lake Placid
