= Mark Ellis =

Mark Ellis or Marc Ellis may refer to:

== Athletes ==
- Mark Ellis (baseball) (born 1977), Major League Baseball player
- Mark Ellis (cricketer) (born 1962), English former cricketer
- Mark Ellis (footballer, born 1962), English footballer who played for Bradford City
- Mark Ellis (footballer, born 1988), English footballer who plays for Barrow
- Mark Ellis (hurler) (born 1990), Irish hurler
- Marc Ellis (rugby) (born 1971), New Zealand rugby league and union footballer

== Other people ==
- Mark Ellis (actor), Canadian actor
- Mark Ellis (lawyer) (born 1957), English/American international lawyer
- Mark Ellis (American author), American novelist and comic-book writer
- Mark Ellis (Formula One), British Formula One engineer
- Mark Ellis (Welsh author), Welsh thriller writer
- Mark Ellis (yacht designer), Canadian/American sailboat designer
- Marc H. Ellis (born 1952), theologian and philosopher
- Flood (producer) or Mark Ellis, English producer and recording engineer
