= Welbore Ellis =

Welbore Ellis may refer to:

- Welbore Ellis (bishop) (1651–1734), English bishop of Kildare and of Meath and Irish privy councillor
- Welbore Ellis, 1st Baron Mendip (1713–1802), British statesman, son of the bishop

== See also ==
- Welbore Ellis Doyle
- Welbore Ellis Agar (nephew of first Baron Mendip)
- Welbore Ellis Agar, 2nd Earl of Normanton
