= Nike Free =

Minimalist running shoe by Nike

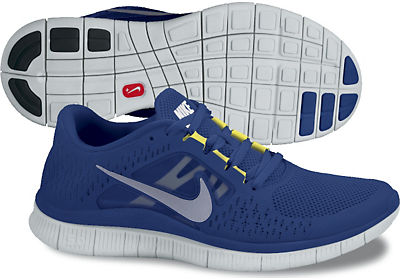
- Type: Sneakers
- Inventor: Nike, Inc.
- Inception: 2005; 21 years ago
- Manufacturer: Nike
- Website: nike.com/free

Nike Free is a minimalist running shoe. It was introduced in 2005 after Nike representatives observed Nike sponsored track athletes training barefoot.

== Overview ==
The numbering system indicates the cushioning of the shoe and follows a scale ranging from 0 (barefoot) to 10 (normal running shoe). Free 3.0 is the least and Free 7.0 (discontinued) is the most cushioned model so far.

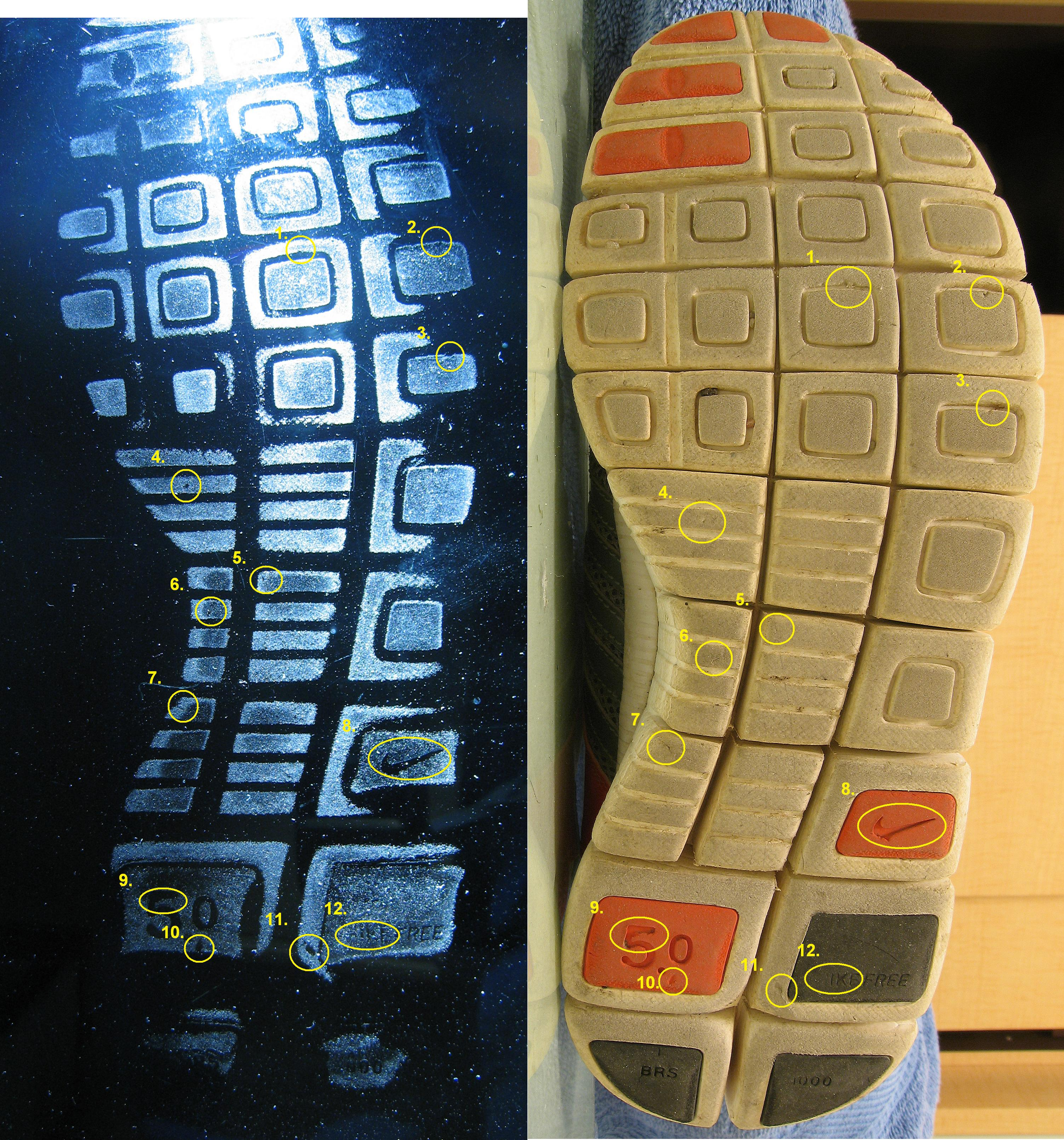
Footwear impression and the outsole from a piece of footwear

Nike started the Free series with the Free 5.0 in 2005 and in 2006 released a new version of the shoe, the Nike Free 5.0 V2, that addressed some durability issues. Also, the heel and sidewalls of the shoe were redesigned to prevent tearing.

Since then, the Nike Free 5.0 V3 (2007), Free 5.0 V4 (2009), and Free 5.0 V5 (2013) have been released along with other models, such as the Free 3.0 V1–V5 and the Free 7.0 V1 and V2.

In 2016, Nike retired the numbering system in favor of the RN designation. In 2019, Nike brought back the numbering system in the new Nike Free RN 5.0 and the Free RN 3.0. In 2019 the naming was changed again. The Free series consists of only two models, the RN 5.0 and RN Flyknit 3.0.

In 2021, around 10 years after the first release in 2011, the Free Run 2 was available again. For this release, slightly different materials were used, for example the logo on the heel was no longer printed, but sewn. Initially, the colors black and white were available, and later other colors followed. The ID of the Free Run 2 (537732) in its original colors is in the range from around 2011, while new colors from 2021 use letters in the first two places. As is common with many Nike shoes today, versions for older kids (DD0163), younger kids (DA2689) and toddlers (DA2692) have also been released.

In addition to the main series, offshoot models have been released over time, such as the Free 7.0, Free Inneva Woven, Free SB, Free RN Distance, and Free TR.

== See also ==
- Barefoot running
- Vivobarefoot
- FiveFingers
- Rocker bottom shoe
