= Jimmy Ellis =

Jimmy Ellis may refer to:

- Jimmy Ellis (boxer) (1940–2014), American boxer
- Jimmy "Orion" Ellis (1945–1998), American singer
- Jimmy "Preacher" Ellis (1934–2022), American musician
- Jimmy Ellis (singer) (1937–2012), lead singer of The Trammps
- Jimmy Ellis (fl. 1970s), former American motocross racer in AMA Supercross Championship

== See also ==
- James Ellis (disambiguation)
- Jim Ellis (disambiguation)
