= Michael Ellis (designer) =

American transportation designer

Michael Ellis (born October 1962) is an American transportation designer. His firm, Ellis Industrial Design, provides design services in the areas of transportation, product and machine design. He is also, on the board of directors of kIDs Innovation Studios, a youth enrichment program created to develop technical, creative and critical thinking skills.

Previously, Ellis was a Chief Designer for Ford Motor Company, Ellis’ designs include such vehicles as the Ford Ranger, Ford Explorer, Ford Expedition and TH!NK city vehicle lines. Four of his vehicles achieved industry-wide segment sales, volume and profit records and he has had six vehicles with design input appear simultaneously on America's list of top ten best-selling cars. Ellis also holds multiple innovation and design patents. Ellis has lived / worked in England, Germany, Italy, Sweden, and Norway.

Ellis is a graduate of the College for Creative Studies in Detroit, Michigan.
