= David Ellis (English cricketer) =

English cricketer

Personal information
- Full name: David John Ellis
- Born: 13 April 1934 (age 92); Middlesbrough, Yorkshire, England
- Batting: Right-handed

Domestic team information
- Years: Team
- 1961–1966: Durham

Career statistics
Competition	List A
Matches	2
Runs scored	3
Batting average	1.50
100s/50s	–/–
Top score	2
Balls bowled	–
Wickets	–
Bowling average	–
5 wickets in innings	–
10 wickets in match	–
Best bowling	–
Catches/stumpings	–/–
- Source: Cricinfo, 6 August 2011

David John Ellis (born 13 April 1934) is a former English cricketer. Ellis was a right-handed batsman. He was born in Middlesbrough, Yorkshire.

Ellis made his debut for Durham against Northumberland in the 1961 Minor Counties Championship. He played Minor counties cricket for Durham from 1961 to 1966, making 36 Minor Counties Championship appearances. He made his List A debut against Hertfordshire in the 1964 Gillette Cup. In this match, he scored 2 runs before being dismissed by Robin Marques. He made a further List A appearance against Sussex in the following round of the same competition. He scored a single run in this match, before being dismissed by Ian Thomson, with Sussex winning by 200 runs.
