= David Ellis (Australian footballer) =

Australian rules footballer

Personal information
- Full name: David Ellis
- Born: 11 November 1949 (age 76)
- Original team: Sandringham
- Height: 194 cm (6 ft 4 in)
- Weight: 89 kg (196 lb)
- Position: Ruck

Playing career^{1}
Years	Club	Games (Goals)
1972–74, 1977	St Kilda	27 (4)
- ^{1} Playing statistics correct to the end of 1977.

David Ellis (born 11 November 1949) is a former Australian rules footballer who played with St Kilda in the Victorian Football League (VFL). After completing his University studies at La Trobe University he left Victoria to become the Chief Medical Scientist in charge of the National Mycology Reference Unit based at the Adelaide Children's Hospital.
