= Richard Ellis (journalist) =

Richard Ellis is the executive director, editorial for the Telegraph Media Group. He joined the Sunday Telegraph in September 2001 as assistant editor in charge of the newsdesk after working at The Sunday Times, the Sunday and Daily Express, The Observer and The Sporting Life. He was appointed deputy editor in February 2006, and, after the dismissal of editor Sarah Sands that March, became acting editor for five weeks. He took up his current position in December 2006.

Media offices
Preceded by Matthew D'Ancona	Deputy Editor of the Sunday Telegraph; 2006	Succeeded by Dan Roberts
