= Charles Ellis (cricketer, born 1815) =

English cricketer and British Army officer

Personal information
- Full name: Charles Ellis
- Born: 16 August 1815; England
- Died: Unknown
- Batting: Unknown

Domestic team information
- Years: Team
- 1833: Marylebone Cricket Club

Career statistics
Competition	First-class
Matches	3
Runs scored	6
Batting average	1.20
100s/50s	–/–
Top score	3
Catches/stumpings	–/–
- Source: Cricinfo, 14 August 2021

Charles Ellis (1815 — date of death unknown) was an English first-class cricketer.

Ellis was educated at Harrow School, where he played for the cricket eleven. He played first-class cricket shortly after finishing his education at Harrow, with three appearances in 1833. Each appearance came for a different team, with his debut coming for an A to K team against an L to Z team. His second match came for the Marylebone Cricket Club against the Gentlemen of Kent, while his third match came for the Gentlemen in the Gentlemen v Players fixture; all of his first-class appearances came at Lord's. Ellis scored 6 runs across these matches, with a highest score of 3.
