= Scott Ellis (disambiguation) =

Scott Ellis is a director.

Scott Ellis may also refer to:

- Scott Ellis (cricketer) (born 1975)
- Scott Ellis (actor) in The Miserables
- Scott Ellis (drummer) in She Wants Revenge
- Scott Ellis (sailor) in Laser World Championships
- Scott Ellis (soccer), player for Kalamazoo Outrage
