= Allan Ellis =

Allan Ellis may refer to:

- Allan Ellis (American football) (1951–2013), American football player
- Allan Ellis (rugby league) (1909–1984), Australian rugby league footballer
