= Alexander Ellis =

Alexander or Alex Ellis may refer to:

- Alexander John Ellis (1814–1890), English mathematician and philologist
- Boo Ellis (Alexander Ellis, 1936–2010), American basketball player
- Alexander Ellis III (born 1949), American businessman
- Sir Alex Ellis (diplomat) (born 1967), British diplomat
- Alex Ellis (racing driver) (born 1991), Canadian racing driver
- Alex Ellis (American football) (born 1993), American football tight end
- Alex Ellis (rugby union) (born 1995), Canadian rugby union player
