= Philip Ellis =

Philip Ellis may refer to:

- Philip Ellis (priest) (1822–1900), Welsh clergyman
- Philip Michael Ellis (1652–1726), English bishop of Segni
- Philip Ellis (racing driver) (born 1992), German racing driver
- Philip Ellis Wheelwright (1901–1970), American philosopher
