= Edwin Ellis (musician) =

English musician

Edwin Ellis (1844–1878) was an English musician.

== Life ==
Ellis received his professional training from his father, and appeared when a boy of seven as solo violinist at Cremorne Gardens. He joined the orchestras of the Princess's and Adelphi theatres, becoming general musical director at the Adelphi about 1867, and composing music suitable for the dramas given there. In poor health, he then worked in the band of the Queen's Theatre, Liverpool, for a change of air. His health, however, did not improve, and he died aged 35, at St. Thomas's Hospital, 20 October 1878.

== Works ==
His published compositions consisted of selections for small orchestra from Friedrich von Flotow's Alessandro Stradella, Ambroise Thomas's Caïd, and Jacques Offenbach's La belle Hélène, besides songs to words by Edward Litt Laman Blanchard and others.
