= John Ellis (physicist, born 1963) =

British physicist and educator

- Education: University of Cambridge, St John's College
- Scientific career
- Workplaces: University of Cambridge; University of East Anglia
- Website: Dr John Ellis, Physics Department

John Ellis is the current director of studies for Natural Sciences at Gonville and Caius College, Cambridge. His research is on helium-3 surface spin echo, an inelastic scattering technique.

== Early life and education ==
Ellis studied at St John's College, Cambridge, where he obtained a first-class degree in natural sciences. He obtained a PhD in surface physics from the Cavendish Laboratory, Cambridge. He then spent three years at the Max Planck Institute for Dynamics and Self-Organization in Göttingen, during which he continued using helium scattering to probe surface structure and dynamics. Thereafter, he returned to Cambridge as a fellow of Lloyd's Tercentenary Research Foundation, later progressing to an EPSRC advanced fellow. He went on to become the assistant director of research at the Cavendish Laboratory, where he led the development of the Cavendish’s spin-echo instrument and research project.

== Research ==
Ellis specialises in surface physics and imaging techniques.

=== Helium-3 spin-echo spectroscopy ===
This technique has the potential for measurements on a nanoscale distance and over picosecond timescales. Ellis published a complete review of the current progress and future scientific challenges in this field in 2009.

== Awards ==
Ellis was nominated for the Student-Led Teaching Awards in 2019. This is an award given by the Cambridge University Students' Union annually with the nominations made by the students.
