= Robert Ellis (clergyman) =

Welsh clergyman (1898–1966)

Robert Morton Stanley Ellis (1 April 1898 – 2 November 1966) was a Welsh author and a minister with the Presbyterian Church of Wales (the Welsh Calvinistic Methodists).

Ellis was born on the Flintshire coast, but spent much of his childhood in Glanamman, a Welsh-speaking coalmining village in the Amman Valley in Carmarthenshire. He left school aged 12 and worked in a shop, then as a coalminer and as a tinplate worker. He started lay preaching at Bethania Presbyterian church, Glanaman, and was trained for the ministry at the Presbyterian colleges at Aberystwyth and Bala. He was ordained in 1925: his first churches were in Cardiganshire. In 1930 he returned to the Amman valley, as minister of Caersalem Chapel, Ty Croes, on the outskirts of Ammanford, where he remained for 36 years. In 1965 he was elected as Moderator of the South Wales Association of the Presbyterian Church of Wales.

Ellis was well known throughout Wales both as a preacher and as a popular lecturer - his lectures focused on the great preachers of the Welsh pulpit tradition. He wrote for the Welsh religious press between 1930 and his death in 1966. Three of his books also examine great Welsh preachers:

- Living Echoes (1957),
- Doniau a danwyd (1957),
- Lleisiau Ddoe a Heddiw (1963).

In 1963 he published a well received and entertaining autobiography:

- Wrth Gofio'r Daith (1963) [Remembering the Journey].
