= Charles Ellis (cricketer, born 1830) =

English cricketer

Charles Howard Ellis (9 August 1830 – 17 January 1880) was an English cricketer active from 1856 to 1868 who played for Sussex. He was born in Ditchling and died in Brighton. He appeared in 80 matches as a righthanded batsman who bowled underarm. He scored 1,812 runs with a highest score of 83 and took 100 wickets with a best performance of eight for 96.
