= George Ellis (silversmith) =

British silversmith (1863–1944)

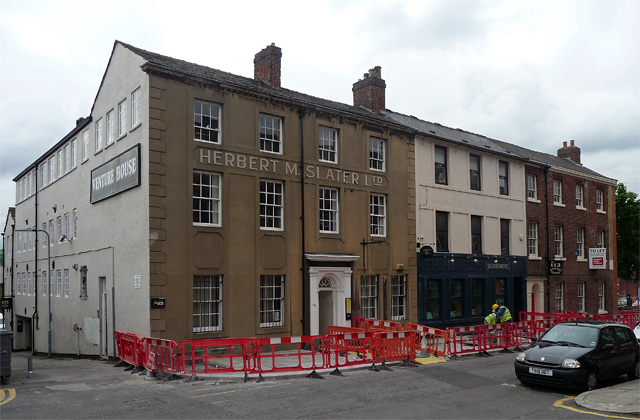
- George Ellis' final workshop was at 107−109 Arundel Street in Sheffield – the middle business in this 2012 photo. The buildings date from 1791 and were originally houses and offices at the street, with workshops behind, arranged around courtyards
- Born: 1863
- Died: 1944 (aged 80–81)
- Occupation: Silversmith

George Ellis (1863–1944) was a British silversmith, based in Sheffield, England.

In 1895, when he was around 32 years old, he began working from a workshop in Court 12, 16 John Street, near London Road in Sheffield. The address was occupied by several other craftsmen, including a "scissor smith", Charles Reynolds; William Addy, a file forger; a silver plater named Joseph Turner; and William Stones, another silversmith.

In 1900, when he was around 37, Ellis moved his business to 100a Charles Street.

He is described in the Sheffield trade directory as a "maker of fish eaters, carvers, desserts, jams, butters, spoons, etc. to the trade". Records at Sheffield Assay Office indicate that Ellis registered his first mark, GE, in May 1912.

In 1932, the business became a limited liability company and was renamed "George Ellis [Silversmiths] Ltd.", based at 107–109 Arundel Street. A trade directory from two years later lists Ellis as the managing director of the business. The business continued after his death, but was no listed in the trade directory after 1971.

The Arundel Street frontage is still visible today. In August 2008, Gordon Ramsay visited the restaurant, then named The Runaway Girl and owned by Justin Rowntree for three years, in an episode of his Ramsay's Kitchen Nightmares series. The restaurant was renamed Silversmiths during filming, with the 1932-embossed name on the front highlighted, and was listed in the Good Food Guide for three years. Rowntree sold the business in 2017, and it had two owners in as many years.

== Personal life ==
Ellis was married to Louisa. They had a daughter, Winifred Grace. In 1912 they were living at 199 Chippinghouse Road in the Nether Edge area of Sheffield.

== Death ==
Ellis died in 1944, aged around 81.
