= Edmund Ellis =

Edmund Ellis may refer to:

- Edmund Ellis (cricketer), English cricketer and solicitor
- Edmund Elys or Ellis (1633–1708), English clergyman, poet and writer
