= Simon Ellis =

Simon Ellis may refer to:

- Simon Ellis (record producer), producer and musical director
- Simon Ellis (film director), British film director
- Simon Ellis (sailor) (born 1963), Hong Kong sailor
