= David Ellis (architect) =

Canadian architect

David Ellis (born in 1953) is a Canadian architect, based in Sault Ste. Marie, Ontario. He is perhaps best known for his winning entry for the World Bank's Malaysian Health Development Project Design Competition along with his countless architectural designs built in Sault Ste Marie, Ontario. "Design is not a product, but a process", David Ellis stated this phrase to explain his view of architectural philosophy through his commitment to architecture, planning and interior design. This philosophy led into his design specialty for buildings that have complex academic innovation as well as attention to the human condition. His vision included revitalizing Northern communities and bringing technology and detail to the human condition. Many of David Ellis' design choices come from a relationship between building and environment, "Everyone needs to have a relationship with their environment".

== Life ==
Born in Sault Ste. Marie, Ontario, David Ellis began his early childhood growing up in Northern Ontario, as he came of age for post-secondary education, Mr. Ellis left to attend Carleton University for his architecture degrees. After completing his schooling, David Ellis returned to Sault Ste. Marie, Ontario and began giving back to the community. David Ellis has always had a connection to the eco-friendly aspects of architecture, creating a connection between building and landscape, with the conservation of energy in their operation. He continued this concept throughout his education and into real practice, first designing earth sheltered and solar homes in the late 1970s and became the first LEED accredited architect, as well as designed the first Net Zero building, in the Sault Ste. Marie area.

Additionally, he is an accomplished competitive cyclist, having won gold medals as Ontario Best All Round Time Trial Champion two years running, plus silver and bronze in other years. He used his racing experience to become a bicycle frame designer, along with longtime friend, associate and master craftsman, Hans Metzen. Their bicycles have been ridden by athletes competing in National and World Championships, both on the road and track.

== Career ==
After completing his education at Carleton University, Mr. Ellis moved back to Sault Ste. Marie and joined D. Perry Short Architect in 1978. After five years of Ellis being employed the firm became a partnership between Short and Mr. Ellis, until Short's retirement in 1990. Ellis became the sole architect and the name was now changed to David Ellis Architect Inc. The firm then competed and won the World Bank's Malaysian Health Development Project Design Competition, which resulted in other partners coming aboard to increase the size of the firm. As more partners came aboard, Mr. Ellis was the founder principal and lead designer of the firms EPA (Ellis, Pastore Architecture) and EPO (Ellis, Pastore, Oswin Consultants). However, after a couple projects together as a firm, Mr. Ellis decided to work independently again, establishing the firm known today as, david ELLIS architect Inc.

=== Architecture Style and Philosophy ===
Throughout David Ellis' years of designing, it is evident that Mr. Ellis was influenced through his birthplace within a Northern community, as his design influences often reflect a connection to the exterior landscape through various lighting practices and material choices. For example, in many of his lab designs, such as the Technology and Science Design Centre, discussed further under ‘works’, Mr. Ellis uses the end of corridors as spaces to connect with the outdoors, as well as a space for people to congregate and chat. Many of David Ellis' designs use building cantilevers and natural shading to produce spaces that have less reliance on mechanical systems, and more of a connection to the environment around it, through various strategies that mitigate heat and allow cross-ventilation to occur in many designs.

==== Sustainability and LEED accredited Designs ====
The firm's intentions and smaller projects within the community, exemplify david ELLIS architect Inc., as a sustainable and environmentally friendly firm. In specific, the firm speaks about its use of sustainable design with the community. The RYTAC building in Sault Ste. Marie, depicts a structure constructed along the St. Mary's River, in Sault Ste. Marie, Ontario. This building is an example of adaptive reuse and use of eco-friendly practices in order to limit the amount of damage done to the site, plus very high thermal properties to the building envelope. Another factor that the firm focuses on is the delivery of materials and accounting similar to many LEED standards in all of the build concepts. Materials are chosen from a local source. For example, many steel beams and connectors are sourced directly from the Steel mill within the city of Sault Ste. Marie, creating minimal carbon output upon delivery of materials as delivery is below 50 km in roadway distance. Being the only LEED certified architect currently practising in Sault Ste Marie, David Ellis himself focuses on bringing these requirements to life in every build to allow for the rejuvenation of Northern Ontario in the years to come without requirement to re-approach his designs in future.

==== Restorative and Adaptive Reuse Designs ====
In terms of sustainable and eco friendly design, the firm also prides itself on designing architecture with our cultural heritage in mind. David Ellis spent many months designing and building these additions to a cultural building, while respecting its heritage and allowing it to still create the same experience it once did. Another example of culturally sensitive design would be the addition to the Ermintinger Old Stone House, the oldest stone structure in Canada, west of Toronto. He created a ‘summer kitchen’, as a log cabin placed within the site. The firm spent many hours trying to replicate and understand how the Ermatinger family lived and functioned during the pioneer era in Northern Ontario. Mr. Ellis is quoted saying that he wanted to keep the original tower outside the Sault Ste. Marie Events Centre (GFL Memorial Gardens) as it remains a cultural image of the downtown core of Sault Ste Marie. David believed that through small but important landmarks on the old site, can become rejuvenated and adapted to work for future programming. Succeeding in this action, David not only kept the memorial tower, and did not revise the topology of the site, lending it to create a dynamic staircase that now signifies a main entry point.This shows how the firm wants to revitalise the Northern Communities and bring back the history that made the North what it is today, and continue to push our heritage and culture into the future of architecture. The connection between future and past can therefore allow the viewer to have a human experience within David ELLIS architect's buildings.

== Publications ==
The work of David Ellis is regularly featured in design and architectural journals and has received a number of international and national design awards, such as his winning entry for the World Bank's Malaysian Health Development Project Design Competition, awards from the American Architectural Woodwork Institute (LSSU Crawford Hall), the Association of Registered Interior Designers of Ontario (Floreani Clinic) and the Canadian Terrazzo, Tile and Marble Institute (John Rhodes Community Pool). Recognition of technical expertise is evidenced by his R&D Magazine's "Laboratory of the Year" and two "Ontario Global Traders Awards" for his research and work abroad.

His design work has been recently published in: The Canadian Architect, Perspectives, One Thousand Architects, Architecture Malaysia, Magazin fur Kunden und Mitarbeiter, DimensionsMagazine, Research and Development Magazine, Steel Design, Canada's Cultural Places, Canada Builds Magazine, etc. He has also contributed in many architecturally related areas, such as the Ontario government's "Heritage Tool Kit". He was the keynote speaker to the Commonwealth Scientific Congress, held in Sarawak, Borneo, the Scientific Equipment and Furniture Association annual convention in Chicago, and the Ontario Global Trader's Awards, in addition to lecturing at Construct Canada, Toronto, the Pittsburgh Scientific Conference and many other architectural design and historical symposia.

== Notable design projects ==
Among the many projects that David Ellis has completed in his career are the following:

=== Algoma University Convergence Centre, Ontario, Canada ===
The concept of the Essar Convergence Centre was to create a sustainable design that integrated human and ecological concerns resulting in a LEED gold designation. Another factor that resulted in the LEED gold standard was the consideration of material delivery and reducing that distance as much as possible, for example the steel came from the Algoma Steel Corporation and concrete was formed using waste products from local industry.

=== ADSB JK to 12 School ===
The ADSB (Algoma District School Board) hired architects David Ellis Architect and Teeple Architect to design a space for the entire community of Hornepayne, ON, to use as a school for all ages. The building features a double-sized gymnasium with a curtain wall to give the ability to split it into two smaller spaces allowing multi-use rooms, a theme seen throughout the design. The project also utilizes many methods of energy saving and environmentally friendly techniques, such as the in-ground geothermal heating system. This system consists of seventy-two, 100m deep wells in order to naturally heat/cool the structure.

=== Canada ===
- Algoma University Biosciences and Technology Convergence Centre, Ontario, Canada
- Government of Canada Great Lakes Forest Research Centre/Forest Pest Management Institute/Ontario Forest Research Institute complex, Ontario, Canada
- Canadian Bushplane Heritage Centre Entrance, Ontario, Canada
- 4D Theatre at the Canadian Bushplane Museum, Ontario, Canada
- Group Health Centre, Ontario, Canada
- The Group Health Centre and Sault Ste. Marie Innovation Centre joint Community Geomatics Centre
- Hockey Heritage North, Ontario, Canada
- The new Sault Area Hospital (co-design), Sault Ste. Marie, Ontario, Ontario, Canada (currently under construction)
- Algoma Residential Community Hospice, Ontario, Canada
- Floreani Orthodontic Clinic, Ontario, Canada
- Ontario Provincial Police Department, Ontario, Canada
- Sault Ste. Marie Events Centre, Ontario, Canada
- Ontario Winter Games Pool, Ontario, Canada
- John Rhodes Community Centre, Ontario, Canada
- F.H. Clergue French Immersion School, Ontario, Canada
- Waterfront Residential Project, Ontario, Canada
- Alternative Energy Interpretative Centre
- Algoma District Social Services Administration Building
- Boreal French Immersion School

=== United States ===
- Ozone Project (In "progress") Michigan, U.S.A.
- Lake Superior State University's Crawford hall of Science, Michigan, U.S.A
- Northwestern College Science/IT Centre, Michigan, U.S.A.
- Bay College Science Building, Michigan, U.S.A
- Viterbo University Science and Ethics Building, Wisconsin, U.S.A.

=== International ===
- The Malaysia Health Development Project Regional Laboratories, Kuala Lumpur, Malaysia
- National Blood Service Centre, Malaysia
- Prototypical Middle School Design, St. Lucia
- Australian Great Ocean Drive Residence

== Design awards ==
- 2003 Association of Registered Interior Designers of Ontario, Floreani Orthodontist Clinic
- 2000 Laboratory of the Year, Lake Superior State University's Crawford Hall of Science by Research Facilities Design and R&D Magazine
- 2000 American Woodwork Institute Award, Lake Superior State University
- 2000 Canadian Tile, Marble and Terrazzo Institute Award, Ontario Winter Games Pool and Restaurant
- 1998, 2002 Ontario Global Trader Regional Leadership Award – Leadership in the Scientific and Medical Design Fields
- 1995 Design Competition Winner - Sponsor The World Bank, Malaysia Health Development
