= Arthur Ellis =

Arthur Ellis may refer to:

== People ==
- Arthur Ayres Ellis (1830–1887), English academic
- Sir Arthur Ellis (British Army officer) (1837–1907), British Army general and courtier
- Arthur Edward Ellis (1914–1999), English football referee
- Arthur Ellis (rugby union) (born 1990), English rugby union player
- Arthur Ellis (Canadian politician) (1890–1964), Canadian politician
- Arthur Ellis (Maryland politician) (born 1961), American politician
- Arthur B. English (1864/1865–1938), Canada's official hangman who used the pseudonym Arthur Ellis, as did some of his successors
- Arthur Erskine Ellis (1902–1983), British scientist, biologist and naturalist

== Other uses ==
- Arthur Ellis Awards, Canadian awards presented to writers of crime fiction and true crime
