= DeGoy B. Ellis =

American politician

DeGoy Bowman Ellis (November 27, 1876– January 19, 1949) was an American lawyer and politician in Illinois.

Ellis was born on a farm in Boone County, Illinois. He received his bachelor's degree from Dixon College in 1897 and his law degree from University of Illinois College of Law in 1899. Ellis was admitted to the Illinois bar in 1899 and practiced law in Elgin, Illinois. He served as the Elgin city attorney and was a Republican. Ellis served in the Illinois House of Representatives from 1915 to 1921. He died in a hospital following a long illness.
