= Frank Ellis (footballer) =

Australian rules footballer

Personal information
- Full name: Francis Lachlan Ellis
- Born: 7 July 1883; Beaufort, Victoria
- Died: 7 May 1957 (aged 73); Parkville, Victoria
- Original team: Williamstown

Playing career^{1}
Years	Club	Games (Goals)
1910	Richmond	18 (0)
1913	Melbourne	6 (0)
Total		24 (0)
- ^{1} Playing statistics correct to the end of 1913.

Francis Lachlan Ellis (7 July 1883 – 7 May 1957) was an Australian rules footballer who played with Richmond and Melbourne in the Victorian Football League (VFL).
