= Jeff Ellis (plant scientist) =

Australian plant scientist

- Born: Jeffrey Graham Ellis; 4 May 1953 (age 72); Adelaide
- Education: University of Adelaide (Ph.D. 1981)
- Known for: Cloning and characterizing plant disease resistance genes
- Scientific career
- Fields: Plant Genetics
- Institutions: CSIRO Plant Industry

Jeffrey Graham (Jeff) Ellis FRS FAA (born 4 May 1953 in Adelaide) is an Australian plant scientist, and Program Leader at CSIRO Plant Industry.

== Life ==
He earned a BAgSc in 1976, and a PhD in 1981, from the University of Adelaide. In 1984, as a Research Scientist in CSIRO Plant Industry, he worked on the identification of transcriptional control elements in the promoters of the maize alcohol dehydrogenase gene and the Agrobacterium T-DNA gene octopine synthase. Ellis and his research team were among the first to clone and characterize plant disease resistance genes.
