= Jerry Ellis (Washington politician) =

American politician

Member of the Washington House of Representatives for the 14th district
- In office 1983–1985

Personal details
- Party: Democratic
- Occupation: director, business manager

Jerry Ann Ellis is a former American politician in the state of Washington. She served as state representative for the 14th district (Yakima County) from 1983 to 1985. Ellis, a Democrat, was a former director of the Washington State Department of Transportation Economic Partners Program, and a congressional staff director in Washington's 4th district.
