= Eric Ellis =

Eric Ellis may refer to:

- Eric Ellis (journalist), Australian journalist
- Eric Ellis (politician) (born 1942), former Australian politician
