= David Ellis (Scottish footballer) =

Scottish footballer

Personal information
- Date of birth: 2 March 1900
- Place of birth: Glasgow, Scotland
- Height: 5 ft 8 1/2 in (1.74 m)
- Position: Outside right

Senior career*
Years	Team	Apps	(Gls)
–	Ashfield		
1919–1922	Airdrieonians	64	(4)
1922–1923	Maidstone United		
1923–1924	Manchester United	11	(0)
1924–1926	St Johnstone	32	(1)
1926–1928	Bradford City		
1928–1929	Arthurlie	12	(0)
- * Club domestic league appearances and goals

David Ellis (born 2 March 1900, date of death unknown) was a Scottish footballer. His regular position was as an outside right. He was born in Glasgow. He played for Airdrieonians, Maidstone United, Manchester United, Bradford City, St Johnstone,= and Arthurlie.
