= Attorney General Ellis =

Attorney General Ellis may refer to:

- Adolphus A. Ellis (1848–1921), Attorney General of Michigan
- W. H. Ellis (1867–1948), Attorney General of Florida
- Wade H. Ellis (1866–1948), Attorney General of Ohio
