= Ryan Ellis (disambiguation) =

Ryan Ellis (born 1991) is a Canadian ice hockey defenceman.

Ryan Ellis may also refer to:

- Ryan Ellis (racing driver) (born 1989), American professional stock car racing driver
- Ryan Ellis (baseball) (born 1978), American baseball coach
- Ryan Ellis (singer), American Christian musician

== See also ==
- Ellis Ryan (1904–1966), principal owner of the Cleveland Indians, 1949–1952
