= Francis Ellis (cricketer) =

English cricketer

Personal information
- Born: 20 September 1889; Littledean Gloucester, England
- Died: July 1960
- Batting: Right-handed

Domestic team information
- Years: Team
- 1914-1921: Gloucestershire
- Source: Cricinfo, 27 March 2014

Francis Ellis (20 September 1889 - July 1960) was an English cricketer. He played for Gloucestershire between 1914 and 1921, playing 26 matches. He scored 241 runs and took 70 wickets. His best bowling was 6-90 against Kent in 1914. Francis died in July 1960.
