= Ralph Ellis =

Ralph Ellis may refer to:

- Ralph Ellis (painter) (1885–1963), English painter and designer of inn signs
- Ralph W. Ellis (1856–1945), American lawyer, banker and politician
- Ralph Ellis, member of British band The Swinging Blue Jeans
