= Reg Ellis =

Reg Ellis may refer to two cricketers:

- Reg Ellis (Australian sportsman) (1891–1959), played cricket for Victoria and competed in the Victorian Football League
- Reg Ellis (cricketer, born 1917) (1917–2015), played cricket for the Australian Services cricket team and South Australia
