= Keith Ellis =

Keith Ellis may refer to:

- Keith Ellis (musician) (1946–1978), English bass player
- Keith Ellis (rugby league) (1905–1972), Australian rugby league player
- Keith Ellis (rugby union) (1927–1989), Australian rugby union player
- Keith Ellis (footballer) (1935–2026), English footballer
- R. Keith Ellis (born 1949), British theoretical physicist
