= Frank Ellis (coach) =

American football coach and college athletics administrator

Playing career

Football
- 1963–1966: Savannah State

Basketball
- 1962–1966: Savannah State
- Positions: Quarterback, halfback, defensive back (football)

Coaching career (HC unless noted)

Football
- 1969–1976: Savannah State (assistant)
- 1977–1985: Savannah State

Administrative career (AD unless noted)
- 1994–1996: Savannah State

Head coaching record
- Overall: 34–56–2

Frank Ellis Jr. is an American former football coach and college athletics administrator. He served as the head football coach at his alma mater, Savannah State University, from 1977 to 1985, compiling a record of 34–56–2. Ellis was also the athletic director as Savannah State from 1994 to 1996.

Ellis played football and basketball at Savannah State in the 1960s.

== Head coaching record ==
Year	Team	Overall	Conference	Standing	Bowl/playoffs
Savannah State Tigers (Southern Intercollegiate Athletic Conference) (1977–1985)
1977	Savannah State	4–5	3–2	T–2nd (Division II)	
1978	Savannah State	4–6	4–1		
1979	Savannah State	6–3–1	3–1–1		
1980	Savannah State	5–5	4–1		
1981	Savannah State	4–6	1–4		
1982	Savannah State	4–6	3–4		
1983	Savannah State	2–9	1–6		
1984	Savannah State	2–7–1	1–5–1		
1985	Savannah State	2–9	2–4		
Savannah State:		34–56–2	22–28–2		
Total:		34–56–2			
