= Stanley Ellis =

Stanley Ellis may refer to:

- Stanley Ellis (linguist) (1926–2009), English linguistics scholar and broadcaster
- Stanley Ellis (cricketer) (1896–1987), English cricketer
- Stanley Venn Ellis (1875–1916), Royal Navy officer
- Stan Ellis (born 1952), American businessman and politician in California
