= Lee Ellis =

American sociologist

Altis Lee Ellis (born March 1, 1942) is an American sociologist who was a professor of sociology at Minot State University from 1976 to 2007. He was also an assistant and associate professor there from 1976 to 2009, after which he served as a visiting professor at the University of Malaya from 2010 to 2012.

== Education ==
Ellis grew up on a farm near Iola, Kansas. He received his B.A. in sociology from Pittsburg State University in Kansas in 1966, where he went on to receive his M.S. in sociology in 1970. He then received his Ph.D. in criminology from Florida State University in 1983.

== Research ==
Ellis is known for researching the potential biological roots of sexual orientation, and organized a conference on the subject that occurred in May 1995. He has also studied the potential for the use of thyroid and obesity medications during pregnancy to increase the odds of children being homosexual. He has also studied numerous other topics, such as the relationships between obesity in women and the number of children they give birth to, the link between left-handedness and mortality, and the effect one's genes have on the career they end up working in.
