= Greg Ellis =

Greg Ellis may refer to:

- Greg Ellis (actor) (born 1968), English actor
- Greg Ellis (American football) (born 1975), American football player
- Greg Ellis (musician), American musician, member of VAS and Roseland
- Greg Ellis (rugby league), Australian rugby league footballer
