= John Ellis (English cricketer) =

English cricketer

John Ernest Ellis (10 November 1864 – 1 December 1927) was an English first-class cricketer, who played eleven matches for Yorkshire County Cricket Club between 1888 and 1892.

Born in Sheffield, Yorkshire, England, Ellis was a wicket-keeper, who took ten catches and completed eleven stumpings but was less successful with the bat, scoring 14 runs in fifteen innings for an average of 1.55. His best score was 4 not out. He also played for Yorkshire Second XI in 1892.

Ellis died in Sheffield in December 1927.
