= Rick Ellis =

Rick Ellis may refer to:

- Rick Ellis (New Zealander), executive with Telstra Digital Media, formerly CEO of New Zealand's state broadcaster TVNZ
- Rick Ellis, founder of EllisLab, the company behind ExpressionEngine and CodeIgniter

== See also ==
- Rick Elice (born 1956), writer
- Richard Ellis (disambiguation)
