= David Ellis (biographer) =

English academic and writer

- Born: 23 June 1939 (age 87); Swinton
- Writing career
- Genre: Biography
- Subjects: D.H.Lawrence, William Shakespeare, Stendhal, Wordsworth, Byron
- Website: dellis-author.co.uk

David Ellis (born 23 June 1939) is an English academic and writer.

== Biography ==
Ellis went from a local grammar school to study English at Downing College, Cambridge under F. R. Leavis and then spent three years teaching at La Trobe University in Melbourne, Australia. The rest of his academic career was at the University of Kent in Canterbury, apart from two years as a visiting professor in two separate universities in the United States and another as an Andrew Mellon Fellow at the National Humanities Center in North Carolina. In 1998 he took early retirement in order to write more and has since published over a dozen books. He remains an Emeritus Professor at the University of Kent.

== Key publications ==
Ellis’s first publications were a translation of Stendhal’s Memoirs of an Egotist and a book on Wordsworth's Prelude. He was then responsible for the third volume of the new Cambridge biography of D. H. Lawrence (Dying Game) which was short-listed for the James Tait Black award.

Ellis is a prominent researcher and biographer on D. H. Lawrence with key works including Death and the Author: How D. H. Lawrence died, and was remembered (2008) and Love and Sex in D. H. Lawrence (2015). In a review of Death and the Author, Peter Balbert of Trinity University wrote " LET ME BE PRECISE and unequivocal here. David Ellis, the distinguished critic and the author of the third and final volume of the Cambridge life of D.H.Lawrence, now has written nothing less than a masterpiece of biography, intellectual history, and medical inquiry in a study that is simultaneously wide-ranging and sharply focused. " In 2011 Ellis was awarded the Harry T. Moore award for services to Lawrence studies.

Writing biography turned Ellis’s attention to its problems, some of which he addressed in Literary Lives: Biography and the search for understanding (2000). Struck with how many biographies of Shakespeare could appear when so little is known about his private life, he discussed the issues in both That Man Shakespeare (2005) and The Truth about William Shakespeare (2015) although in between he also wrote Shakespeare’s Practical Jokes: an introduction to the comic in his work (2007). Ellis is the author of two memoirs, Memoirs of a Leavisite: The decline and fall of Cambridge English (2013) and Frank Cioffi: the philosopher in shirt-sleeves (2015) and has kept up his interest in Romantic writers with Byron in Geneva: That summer of 1816 (2011) and, most recently, The Story of Stendhal and British Culture (2018).

== Books ==
- Defining Comedy - Reflections on the Usual Suspects (2026), Lutterworth Press ISBN 978-0718898601.
- D. H. Lawrence - Then and Now (2025), Cambridge Scholars Publishing ISBN 978-1036448899.
- Critical Lives: D. H. Lawrence (2025), Reaktion Book ISBN 978-1836390121.
- Critical Lives: Byron (2023), Reaktion Book ISBN 978-1789146820.
- Blasted with Antiquity: Old Age and the Consolations of Literature (2023), The Lutterworth Press ISBN 978-0718897185.
- The Comic in Shakespeare (2022), Cambridge Scholars Publishing ISBN 978-1527585522.
- Perfidious Albion: The Story of Stendhal and British Culture (2018), Edward Everett Root Publishers ISBN 978-1912224005.
- Love and Sex in D. H. Lawrence (2015), Clemson University Press ISBN 978-1942954026.
- Frank Cioffi: The philosopher in shirt-sleeves (2015), Bloomsbury ISBN 978-1472590114.
- Memoirs of a Leavisite: The decline and fall of 'Cambridge English' (2013), Liverpool University Press ISBN 978-1846318894. Long-listed for the J. R. Ackerley prize for autobiography.
- The truth about William Shakespeare (2012), Edinburgh University Press, ISBN 978-0748646678.
- Byron in Geneva: That Summer of 1816 (2011), Liverpool University Press ISBN 978-1846316432.
- Death and the Author: How D. H. Lawrence died, and was remembered (2008), Oxford University Press ISBN 978-0199546657.
- Shakespeare's Practical Jokes: an introduction to the comic in his work (2007), Associated University Presses ISBN 978-0838756805.
- That Man Shakespeare (2005), Helm Information ISBN 978-1903206188.
- Literary Lives: Biography and the Search for Understanding (2000), Edinburgh University Press ISBN 978-0748613724.
- D. H. Lawrence: Dying Game (1998), Cambridge University Press ISBN 978-1107402997. Short-listed for the James Tait Black Memorial Prize.
