= Henry Ellis =

Henry Ellis may refer to:

- Henry Augustus Ellis (1861–1939), Irish Australian physician and federalist
- Henry Ellis (diplomat) (1788–1855), British diplomat
- Henry Ellis (governor) (1721–1806), explorer, author, and second colonial Governor of Georgia
- Henry Ellis (librarian) (1777–1869), English librarian
- Henry Ellis, 2nd Viscount Clifden (1761–1836), Irish politician
- Henry Bramley Ellis (1841–1910), English organist, composer, conductor and teacher
- Henry Havelock Ellis (1859–1939), English physician, eugenicist, writer, progressive intellectual and social reformer
- Henry Walton Ellis (1782–1815), British soldier

== See also ==
- Henry Agar-Ellis, 3rd Viscount Clifden (1825–1866), Irish courtier and racehorse owner
- Harry Ellis (disambiguation)
