= Harry Ellis (cricketer) =

New Zealand cricketer

Personal information
- Full name: William Henry Ellis
- Born: 1873; Glebe Point, Sydney, Australia
- Died: 14 October 1938 (aged 64–65); Auckland, New Zealand
- Role: Wicketkeeper-batsman, occasional bowler

Domestic team information
- Years: Team
- 1904/05–1908/09: Canterbury
- 1911/12: Auckland
- 1913/14–1914/15: Hawke's Bay

Career statistics
Competition	FC
Matches	9
Runs scored	203
Batting average	14.50
100s/50s	0/0
Top score	49
Balls bowled	248
Wickets	9
Bowling average	19.33
5 wickets in innings	1
10 wickets in match	0
Best bowling	5/50
Catches/stumpings	5/4
- Source: CricketArchive, 31 March 2024

William Henry Ellis (1873 – 14 October 1938) was a New Zealand cricketer. He played in nine first-class matches for Canterbury, Auckland and Hawke's Bay from 1904 to 1915.
