= Matt Ellis =

Matthew or Matt Ellis may refer to:

- Matthew Ellis (British musician), pseudonym of novelist Michael Cox
- Matt Ellis (Australian musician) (born 1973), Australian singer-songwriter
- Matthew Ellis, member of A Hope for Home
- Matt Ellis (ice hockey) (born 1981), Canadian ice hockey left winger
- Matt Ellis (Family Affairs), a character in the British TV soap opera Family Affairs
- Matthew Ellis (Marvel Cinematic Universe), a fictional president of the United States of America portrayed by William Sadler in the Marvel Cinematic Universe
