= Leonora Beck Ellis =

American educator and social reformer

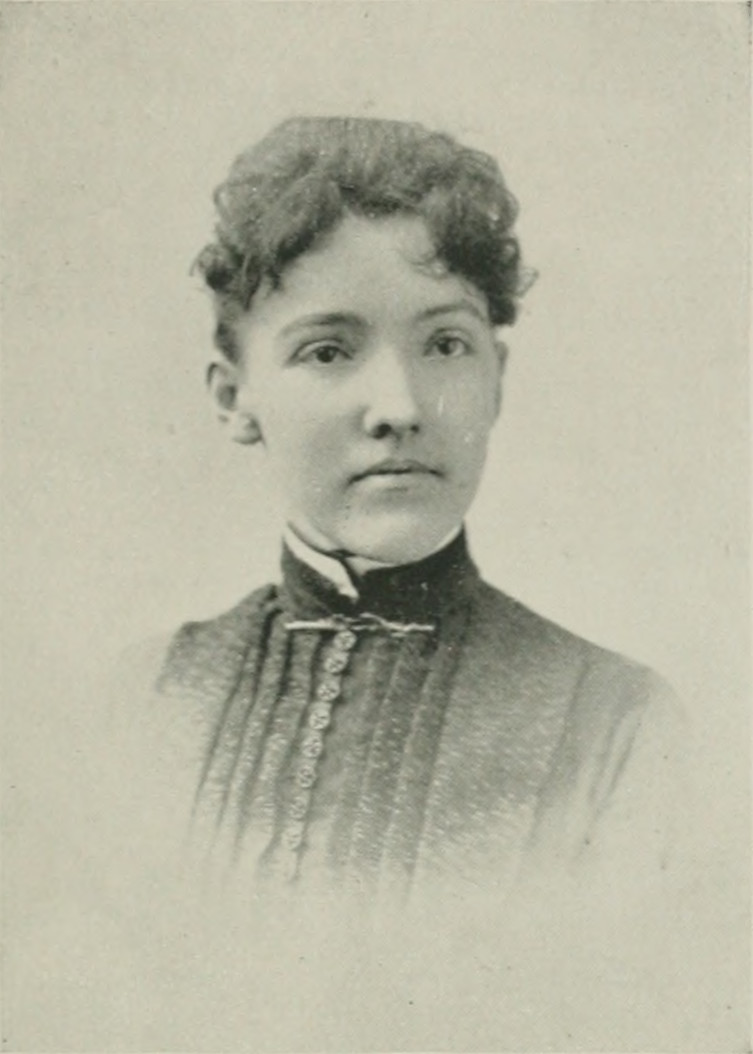
Leonora Beck Ellis

Leonora Beck Ellis (née, Leonora Beck; pen name, Mrs. R. A. Ellis; 1862–1951) was a 19th-century American educator, author, poet, and Southern social reformer, from the U.S. state of Georgia. She served as president of the Woman's Press Association of Georgia In 1889, Ellis removed to Atlanta to engage in founding the Capital Female College, later known as the Leonora Beck College. She served as its president for five years.

== Early years and education ==
Leonora Beck was born near Augusta, Georgia, in 1862. Her father, Rev. James W. Beck (born Wilkes County, Georgia, October 23, 1831), was among the first teachers at Jackson Institute. Her mother was Margaret Willis, of Meriwether County, Georgia. There were two brothers: Marcus W., judge of the Flint circuit court; and Walter L., business manager of the Griffin Wheel company, of Chicago.

At an early age, she showed an unusual aptitude for linguistic study, speaking several modern languages when nine years old. She was well-grounded in Latin and Greek when 15 years old. Ellis was educated at Oxford College, in Alabama, the only college for men in the South which received women. There, she studied and trained for the teaching profession, graduating at the age of 16 years with an A.M. distinction.

== Career ==
At once, Ellis accepted the position of young lady principal in the college at Bowdon, Georgia, which she held for two and a half years. During her connection with that institution, Ellis instructed in metaphysics, Latin and Greek about 100 students, ranging from the ages of 15 to 30 years. Her success as an educator becoming more generally known, she was urged to accept many positions of trust and honor, but declined them. Next, she taught at the Jackson Institute in Jackson, Georgia. In 1889, Ellis removed to Atlanta to engage in founding the Capital Female College, later known as the Leonora Beck College.

After her marriage to Richard Abbey Ellis, editor of the Atlanta Illustrator, on June 2, 1896, she devoted herself to literature. Ellis' earliest articles appeared in Munsey's, Leslie's, the Bachelor of Arts, and the New England Magazine, in 1896 and 1897. Afterwards, she contributed stories, essays, travel sketches, and occasional verse to many different periodicals, but her chief writing was upon economic and sociological themes, and her thoughtful papers upon such subjects appeared from time to time in the Forum, the Arena, the Independent, the Review of Reviews, among others. Especially, she devoted herself to the varying phases of the great industrial revolution in the South, and her papers treating of social, educational, and material conditions in the manufacturing population of that section were accepted as high authority. Besides a volume of stories entitled 'Star Heights', and an occasional poem, a series of essays on Robert Browning was, perhaps, her most enduring contribution to literature.

Ellis was the author of a number of articles bearing upon economic and sociological conditions in the South. The Library of Congress listed her series of articles on child labor, because of the interest which they possess for students of this problem. Ellis spent much of her time in Aripeka, Florida. She was engaged in making investigations among the sponge fishers of the Florida coast.

== Death ==
Leonora Beck Ellis died in December 1951 in Fernandina, Florida. Services were held at the Jackson Cemetery in Jackson, Georgia, on Sunday, December 23, 1951.
