= Matthew d'Ancona =

British journalist

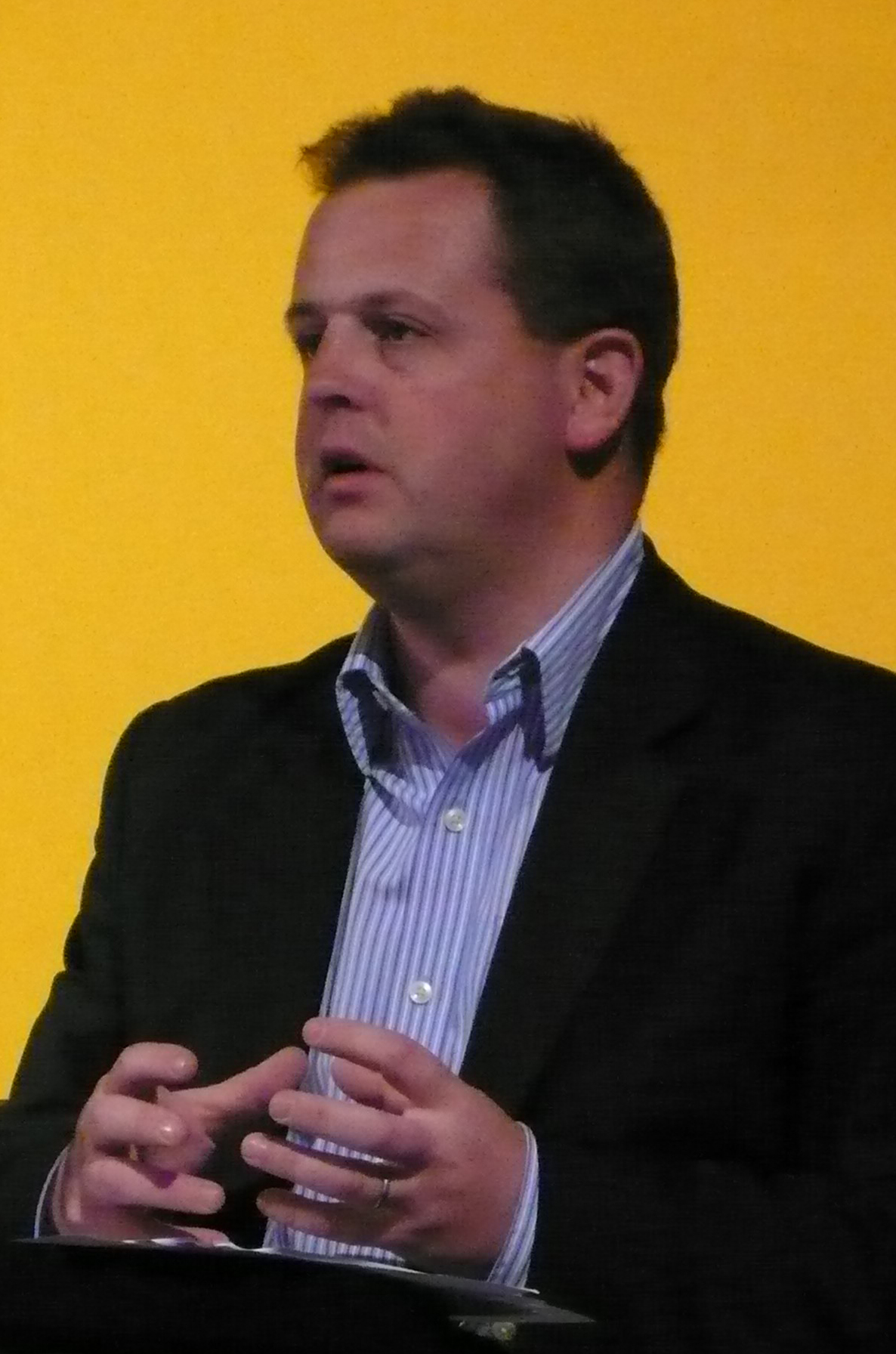
- Matthew d'Ancona in 2008
- Born: Matthew Robert Ralph d'Ancona; 27 January 1968 (age 58); Lewisham, London, England
- Education: St Dunstan's College; Magdalen College, Oxford; All Souls College, Oxford
- Occupation: Journalist
- Known for: Editor of The Spectator; Columnist for The Sunday Telegraph; Editor-at-large of The New World

Matthew Robert Ralph d'Ancona (born 27 January 1968) is an English journalist and editor-at-large of The New European/The New World since 2023. A former deputy editor of The Sunday Telegraph, he was appointed editor of The Spectator in February 2006, a post he retained until August 2009.

== Early life and education ==
D'Ancona's father was a Maltese tennis champion of Italian descent who moved to England to study and played youth football for Newcastle United before becoming a civil servant. His mother was an English teacher. D'Ancona was educated at St Dunstan's College, a private school for boys in Catford in south London. He went to Magdalen College, Oxford, where he studied Modern History. The same year, he was elected a fellow of All Souls College, Oxford.

== Life and career ==
After a year studying medieval confession, d'Ancona joined the magazine Index on Censorship, before proceeding to The Times as a trainee. There he rose to become education correspondent and then assistant editor at the age of 26.

He joined The Sunday Telegraph in 1996 as deputy comment editor and columnist, before becoming deputy editor. He wrote a weekly political column in The Sunday Telegraph for a decade; the column was "treated as the best insight into Cameronism by Conservative MPs". He succeeded Boris Johnson as editor of The Spectator. On 28 August 2009 it was announced that d'Ancona would be stepping down as editor to be replaced by Fraser Nelson.

While not himself a believer, d'Ancona is also the co-author of two books on early Christian theology, The Jesus Papyrus and The Quest for the True Cross. He has written three novels, Going East, Tabatha's Code and Nothing to Fear. D'Ancona has also written several articles for the British political magazine Prospect.

In January 2015, d'Ancona joined The Guardian as a weekly columnist. He left the paper in 2019. He also writes columns for the Evening Standard, GQ and The New York Times, and is a former editor of Tortoise Media.

== Bibliography ==
- D'Ancona, Matthew; Thiede, Carsten (1997). The Jesus Papyrus. Phoenix. ISBN 978-1857999587.
- D'Ancona, Matthew; Thiede, Carsten (2000). The Quest For The True Cross. Phoenix. ISBN 978-0753810828.
- D'Ancona, Matthew (2004). Going East. Sceptre. ISBN 978-0340828472.
- D'Ancona, Matthew (2006). Tabatha's Code. Alma Books Ltd. ISBN 978-1846880124.
- D'Ancona, Matthew (2009). Nothing to Fear. Hodder & Stoughton. ISBN 978-0340828496.
- D'Ancona, Matthew (2014). In It Together: The Inside Story of the Coalition Government. Penguin. ISBN 978-0670919956.
- D'Ancona, Matthew (2017). Post-Truth: The New War on Truth and How to Fight Back. Ebury Press. ISBN 978-1785036873.
- D'Ancona, Matthew (2021). Identity, Ignorance, Innovation: Why the old politics is useless - and what to do about it. Hodder & Stoughton. ISBN 978-1785036873.

Media offices
| Preceded by Kim Fletcher | Deputy Editor of the Sunday Telegraph; 1998–2006 | Succeeded by Richard Ellis |
| Preceded by Boris Johnson | Editor of The Spectator; 2006–2009 | Succeeded by Fraser Nelson |
