= Frank C. Ellis =

American politician

Member of the U.S. House of Representatives from Missouri's 154th district

Missouri House of Representatives
- In office 1963–1989

Personal details
- Born: 1913 Lithium, Missouri
- Died: 2002 (aged 88–89) family farm near Sedgewickville, Missouri
- Resting place: Garden of Memories Cemetery near Sedgewickville, Missouri
- Party: Democratic
- Spouse: Jewel Bollinger
- Children: 1 son
- Occupation: farmer

Frank C. Ellis (December 11, 1913 - July 15, 2002) was a Democratic politician who served 26 years in the Missouri House of Representatives. He was born in Lithium, Missouri, in Perry County and was educated in elementary and high school in Sedgewickville, Missouri. On October 2, 1937, he married Jewel Bollinger in Sedgewickville, Missouri. Ellis was once the president of the Patton-Sedgewickville School Board and was a charter member of the Patton Lions Club. He also served on the Bollinger County Health Board, an FHA loan board, United Methodist district offices and conferences, and the board of directors for Black River Co-op for 32 years.
