= Kevin Ellis (Australian rules footballer) =

Australian rules footballer

Personal information
- Full name: Kevin Ellis
- Born: 14 October 1944
- Original team: North Reservoir
- Height: 178 cm (5 ft 10 in)
- Weight: 73 kg (161 lb)

Playing career^{1}
Years	Club	Games (Goals)
1963	Fitzroy	4 (1)
- ^{1} Playing statistics correct to the end of 1963.

Kevin Ellis (born 14 October 1944) is a former Australian rules footballer who played with Fitzroy in the Victorian Football League (VFL).
