= Brian Ellis =

Brian Ellis may refer to:

- Brian Ellis (Australian politician) (born 1950), member of the Western Australian state parliament
- Brian Ellis (American politician), Pennsylvania politician
- Brian David Ellis (1929–2025), philosopher of science at University of Melbourne
