= Ron Ellis (footballer) =

Australian rules footballer, born 1915

Personal information
- Full name: Ronald Herbert Ellis
- Born: 19 September 1915; Carlton North, Victoria
- Died: 2 July 2008 (aged 92); Tasmania
- Original team: Brighton
- Height: 185 cm (6 ft 1 in)
- Weight: 83 kg (183 lb)

Playing career^{1}
Years	Club	Games (Goals)
1943	St Kilda	3 (0)
- ^{1} Playing statistics correct to the end of 1943.

Ronald Herbert Ellis (19 September 1915 – 2 July 2008) was an Australian rules footballer who played with St Kilda in the Victorian Football League (VFL).
