= Daniel Ellis =

Daniel, Danny or Dan Ellis may refer to:

== Sports ==
- Dan Ellis (ice hockey) (born 1980), Canadian ice hockey player
- Danny Ellis (footballer, born 1985), English footballer for Guiseley, Harrogate, Farsley, and Darlington
- Daniel Ellis (footballer, born 1988), English footballer for Stockport and Droylsden
- Dan Ellis (cyclist) (born 1988), Australian sprint cyclist

== Other ==
- Daniel Ellis (botanist) (1772–1841), British physician, aerologist, botanist and author
- Daniel Ellis (Unionist) (1827–1908), captain in the Union army during the American Civil War
- Daniel David Ellis (1860–1927), physician and politician in Saskatchewan, Canada
- Danny Ellis (musician), Irish singer-songwriter
