= Fiona Ellis =

British philosopher

Education
- Education: Birkbeck College, London (BA), St Anne's College, Oxford (BPhil, PhD)
- Thesis: Metaphysics and Metaphor (1997)
- Doctoral advisor: Paul Snowdon,David Wiggins

Philosophical work
- Era: 21st-century philosophy
- Region: Western philosophy
- Institutions: University of Nottingham, University of Roehampton, Heythrop College, London
- Main interests: Philosophy of Religion; Philosophy of Love and Desire; Naturalism; Religious Naturalism.

Fiona Ellis is a British philosopher and Professor of Philosophy at the University of Nottingham. Previously she was Professor of Philosophy at the University of Roehampton. She is known for her work on naturalism.

== Books ==
- God, Value, and Nature, Oxford: Oxford University Press, 2014
- Concepts and Reality in the History of Philosophy: Tracing a Philosophical Error, London: Routledge,2005
