= Andrew Ellis =

Andrew or Andy Ellis may refer to:

- Andrew Ellis (businessman), English businessman and former chairman of Northampton Town F.C.
- Andrew Ellis (cricketer) (born 1982), New Zealand cricketer
- Andy Ellis (rugby union) (born 1984), New Zealand rugby union player
- Andy Ellis (rugby league) (born 1984), English rugby league player
- Andrew Ellis (badminton) (born 1987), badminton player from England
- Andrew Ellis (surgeon) (1792–1867), president of the Royal College of Surgeons in Ireland
- Andrew Ellis, actor in This Is England
- Andy Ellis (basketball) (born 1980), American basketball player previously active in the Japanese bj league
- Andy Ellis, bassist of American metal band ASG
- Andy Ellis, guitarist of the band Black Lab
