= Ben Ellis =

Ben Ellis may refer to:

- Ben Ellis (playwright), Australian playwright
- Ben Ellis (rugby league) (born 1982), rugby player on the St George Dragons
- Ben Ellis (footballer) (1906–c. 1967), Motherwell F.C. and Wales international footballer
- Ben Ellis (baseball) (1870–1931), Major League Baseball infielder

== See also ==
- BenJarvus Green-Ellis (born 1985), American football player
- Ben James-Ellis (born 1988), musical theatre performer and contestant on the BBC television series Any Dream Will Do
