= Herbert Ellis =

Herbert Ellis may refer to:

- Herb Ellis (actor) (1921–2018), American character actor and co-developer of series Dragnet
- Herbert Ellis (RAF officer) (1893–?), British World War I flying ace
- Herbert J. Ellis (1865–1903), banjo player, mandolinist, guitar player and composer
- Herb Ellis (1921–2010), American jazz guitarist
- Sir Doug Ellis (Herbert Douglas Ellis, 1924–2018), British entrepreneur, chairman of Aston Villa Football Club
- Herbert Willoughby Ellis (1869–1943), British entomologist
