= Harold Ellis (cricketer) =

English cricketer

Harold Ellis was an English cricketer active from 1906 to 1910 who played for Northamptonshire. He appeared in 18 first-class matches as a wicketkeeper who was a righthanded batsman. Ellis was born in Burnley on 13 March 1883 and died in Stockport on 31 December 1962. He claimed 34 first-class victims including seven stumpings and he scored 72 runs with a highest score of 18.
