= Jack Ellis (Australian footballer) =

Australian rules footballer

Personal information
- Full name: Jack Ellis
- Born: 20 December 1933 (age 92)
- Original team: Coburg High School
- Height: 183 cm (6 ft 0 in)
- Weight: 69 kg (152 lb)

Playing career^{1}
Years	Club	Games (Goals)
1955–57	Carlton	10 (13)
- ^{1} Playing statistics correct to the end of 1957.

Jack Ellis (born 20 December 1933) is a former Australian rules footballer who played with Carlton in the Victorian Football League (VFL).
