= Samuel Ellis =

Samuel, Sam or Sammy Ellis may refer to:

== People ==
- Sam Ellis (cricketer) (1870/71–1946), English cricketer
- Sam Ellis (footballer) (born 1946), English footballer
- Sam Ellis (runner) (born 1982), British athlete
- J. Sam Ellis, American politician
- Sammy Ellis (1941–2016), American baseball player
- Samuel Ellis (1733–1794), owner of land in New York Harbor after whom Ellis Island is named
- Samuel Ellis (English cricketer) (1851–1930), English cricketer
- Samuel Ellis (New Zealand cricketer) (1889–1949), Auckland (New Zealand) cricketer
- Samuel Burdon Ellis (1787–1865), British Royal Marines officer
- Sam Ellis (songwriter) (born 1987), songwriter and record producer

== Companies ==
- Samuel Ellis and Company, British engineering firm
