= Robert Evan Ellis =

American political scientist

- Education: BA, Eastern Michigan University; PhD, Purdue University
- Occupation: Political scientist
- Writing career
- Subjects: International relations, Military Science
- Notable awards: Order of Military Merit José María Córdova

Robert Evan Ellis is a research professor of Latin American studies at the Strategic Studies Institute, United States Army War College.

== Early life and education ==
Ellis obtained his undergraduate degree from Eastern Michigan University and finished his doctoral studies at Purdue University.

== Career ==
Ellis has worked on the Secretary of state's Policy Planning Staff with responsibilities for Latin America, the Caribbean, and international narcotics and law enforcement matters. In his academic role, his research primarily centers on the region's interactions with China and other actors outside the Western Hemisphere, along with studying transnational organized crime. He has provided testimony to the United States Congress on Latin American security matters on multiple occasions.

== Awards and recognitions ==
- Order of Military Merit José María Córdova
