= Albert Ellis (disambiguation) =

Albert Ellis (1913–2007) was an American psychologist.

Albert Ellis may also refer to:

- Albert Ellis (prospector) (1869–1951), New Zealand prospector and administrator
- Albert J. Ellis Airport, a public airport near Jacksonville, North Carolina, US
- Albert Ellis (footballer) (1889–1961), English footballer
- Albert Gallatin Ellis (1800–1885), politician, newspaper publisher and editor in Wisconsin, US
- Albert H. Ellis (1861–1950), politician and farmer from Oklahoma
