= Woodside, Kings County, Nova Scotia =

Community in Nova Scotia, Canada

Coordinates: 45°11′0″N 64°26′59″W

Woodside in Nova Scotia

Woodside is a community in the province of Nova Scotia, Canada, located in Kings County. It was founded by the Woodside family, who came over from Scotland in 1773 on the ship Hector. Some members of the family stayed in the Pictou region, but some, led by the family head E. Woodside, migrated and established themselves in what is now known as Woodside, Kings County.

Although most of the Woodside clan left Pictou, and Woodside and has since spread out to Prince Edward Island and other provinces (such as Ontario and New Brunswick), there is still some land and descendants of the original family in Nova Scotia.
