= Clement Ellis =

English clergyman and poet

Rev. Clement Ellis (1633–1700) was an English clergyman and poet.

== Life ==
Ellis was born on 2 February 1633 at Rose Castle in Cumberland, England. His father, Captain Philip Ellis (1606–1663), was the steward for Barnaby Potter (1577–1643) Bishop of Carlisle who resided in Rose Castle and who was also Ellis' godfather. He was educated as a child along with the bishop's children. During the English Civil War Captain Ellis defended the castle for four years for the king with his own private funds after the death of the bishop.

He was educated at The Queen's College, Oxford. While in college he received several anonymous donations for his father's suffering during the Civil War and to fund Ellis' education. Ellis would later become a fellow of the college as well. In 1656 he was ordained at Oxford where he preached for several years. Afterwards he became the private chaplain for William then Marquis of Newcastle (later Duke of Newcastle) for a few years. Around the time his book "The Gentle Sinner; or England's Brave Gentlemen" in 1660 he became the rector of the parish of Kirkby-in-Ashfield. At the time that he became the rector the parish was in disorder from the Civil War. Through his charitable work and his church sermons he was able to help bring about unity to the parish that had been lost during the Civil War. While in Kirkby he was offered several opportunities to serve as rector to larger parishes all of which he turned down in favor for his smaller congregation of Kirkby. In 1693 he was appointed to be a prebendary in the collegiate parish church in Southwell. The appointment was intended to be a reward for all of Ellis' work in Kirkby. However, again not wanting to leave his congregation in Kirkby and also because of his ailing health prevented him from fulfilling all of his duties he decided to resign his preferment.

== Family ==
On 4 June 1664, he married Elizabeth Remington. The couple were married by Rev. Robert Remington in London. Elizabeth was born on 17 November 1636 in Lund to Sir Thomas Remington (1610–1681) and Dame Hannah Gee Remington (1611–1691). The couple had four sons and a daughter:

- Margereta Ellis (1665–1741)
- Clement Ellis (1668- ? )
- Philip Ellis (1669–1671)
- Thomas Ellis (1672- ? )
- Philip Ellis (1674–1747)

In July 1691, his wife Elizabeth died of a stroke. On 28 June 1700, Clement died after a lingering illness. The two were buried at the Church in Kirkby in Ashfield at which he had been the rector for several years. Ellis was also the 6th-great-grandfather of the British film actor Donald Pleasence.

== Literary works ==
Ellis wrote several books, sermons, and even a few poems. His literary works tended to focus on Christian spirituality, Christian life styles, etc.

Title of Book	Year Published	Notes
The Gentile Sinner; or, England's Brave Gentlemen	1660	
Catechism	1674	
The vanity of Scoffing, in a letter to a witty gentleman,	1674	
Christianity in Short; or, the way to be a good Christian	1682	
Right Foundation of Seriousness Quietness and Concord	1684	
The Protestant Resolved	1688	co-authored with William Sherlock
The Reflector's Defence of his letter to a good Friend	1688	
Necessity of Consideration and Repentance	1691	
The Parable of Dives and Lazarus	1704	Published by his son after his death
On that of the Unjust Steward	1704	Published by his son after his death
On the Ten Virgins	1704	Published by his son after his death

== References and sources ==
- "Host bibliographic record for boundwith item barcode 89062913330". 12 February 1866 – via Google Books.
- "WORDS: BIOG: Ellis, Clement". words.fromoldbooks.org.
- "Ellis, Clement (1633–1700), Church of England clergyman". Oxford Dictionary of National Biography (online ed.). Oxford University Press. 2004. doi:10.1093/ref:odnb/8689. (Subscription, Wikipedia Library access or UK public library membership required.)
- Cattermole, Richard (12 February 1844). "The Literature of the Church of England Indicated in Selections from the Writings of the Eminent Divines: With Memoirs of Their Lives, and Historical Sketches of the Times in which They Lived". J.W. Parker – via Google Books.
- "Reproducing images from our Collection - National Portrait Gallery". www.npg.org.uk.
