= Rob Elles =

British molecular geneticist

Rob Elles FRCPath
- Born: 1951 (age 74–75)
- Occupation: Molecular geneticist

Rob Elles (born 1951) is a British molecular geneticist.

Early in his career, Elles was a research technician at St Mary's London. He obtained a position at Manchester University in 1983, working on development of the molecular diagnostics laboratory at the same time as undertaking a PhD. He rose to be Clinical Director of Genetic Medicine at Manchester, retiring in 2013.

In the 1990s he served as Secretary of the Clinical Molecular Genetics Society, and as co-chair of the expert group developing the Organisation for Economic Co-operation and Development's guidelines for quality assurance in molecular Genetic Testing.

He was chair of the British Society for Human Genetics from 2007 to 2009, and as such gave evidence to the House of Lords enquiry on Genomic Medicine.
