= Rowan Ellis =

British YouTuber and author

- Education: Durham University
- Occupations: YouTuber; author

YouTube information
- Channel: Rowan Ellis
- Years active: 2014–present
- Genres: Feminist theory; queer theory
- Subscribers: 317,000
- Views: 26 million
- Last updated: December 23, 2025
- Website: rowanellis.com

Rowan Ellis is a British feminist content creator, author and LGBTQ rights advocate.

== Early life ==
Ellis graduated with an English literature degree from Durham University.

== Career ==
Rowan Ellis began uploading videos to YouTube in 2014. Her videos focus on analysing popular culture through the lens of feminist and queer theory.

In September 2016, Ellis was served a notice from Google, which told her that one of her videos on LGBTQ history was to be restricted from receiving ad revenue. The notice, which was also received by other content creators, was criticised for censorship. Soon after, Ellis and other LGBTQ creators began complaining that their videos were being demonetised, age-restricted and de-listed. In total, Ellis found that 40 of her own videos had been restricted.

In March 2017, Ellis drew attention to the restriction of LGBTQ content on YouTube with her video "YouTube is Anti-LGBT?" She pointed out that videos containing LGBT topics had been deemed "inappropriate" by Google's content moderation polices. She added that such restrictions made access to support more difficult for LGBTQ youth and called on YouTube to adjust its policies. Ellis was concerned that LGBTQ videos were being restricted, even when they were about apparently innocuous topics, as it implied that LGBTQ content is inherently more inappropriate than content made by straight people. This video was also restricted by Google and its comments were turned off. Ellis' video prompted other LGBTQ content creators to look at the restrictions on their own videos, with many finding that their content had been deemed "potentially offensive" by Google's content moderation. YouTube apologised for the blocking, demonetisation and age-restricting of LGBTQ videos, claiming it to be an "accident", but a year later creators continued to find their videos were being demonetised for LGBTQ content.

In her 2018 video "Do I Have Privilege?", Ellis explored the issues of intersectionality and social privilege, from her perspective as a queer woman who benefited from class privilege and white privilege. In her 2019 video "The Evolution of Queerbaiting", Ellis identified common forms of LGBT representation and misrepresentation; of the latter, she included queer coding and queerbaiting. Ellis also coined the term "queer catching", in which a piece of media markets a character as LGBTQ, sometimes retroactively, but fails to follow through with it in the text. Among the examples she presented of "queer catching" were Dumbledore in the Harry Potter series and background characters in Star Wars briefly kissing. In another 2019 video "A Children's Show With Gay Characters?", Ellis reported that she had received messages from people describing LGBTQ representation in children's television as "inappropriate", which led her to consider such representation to be a revolutionary act. The video also discussed how the Hays Code resulted in Hollywood movie villains being coded as gay. In her 2020 video "Why is Cottagecore So Gay?", Ellis presented the cottagecore aesthetic as one that provided lesbian women a safe space without homophobia or discrimination.

== Personal life ==
Ellis is an asexual lesbian.

== Bibliography ==
- Here and Queer: A Queer Girl's Guide to Life. Frances Lincoln Children's Books. 2022. ISBN 9780711264755.
