= Fred E. Ellis =

United States Air Force general

Fred E. Ellis is a former major general in the Texas Air National Guard.

== Career ==
Ellis originally joined the United States Air Force in 1968. He was stationed at Keesler Air Force Base until 1970, at which time he was assigned to Griffiss Air Force Base.

After being assigned to the Air Reserve Personnel Center, Ellis joined the Texas Air National Guard in 1972. In 1985, he assumed command of the 254th Combat Communications Group. He remained in the position until 1995 when he became the Air National Guard assistant to the Deputy Chief of Staff of Communications and Information of the Air Force. In 1998, Ellis became the Air National Guard assistant to the Director of Communications and Information.

Awards he received during his career include the Legion of Merit, the Meritorious Service Medal, the Air Force Commendation Medal, the Air Force Achievement Medal, the Air Force Outstanding Unit Award, the Organizational Excellence Award, the National Defense Service Medal, the Air Force Longevity Service Award, the Combat Readiness Medal, the Armed Forces Reserve Medal and the Air Force Training Ribbon.

== Education ==
- Texas Tech University
- Southern Methodist University
- Squadron Officer School
- Air Command and Staff College
- Air War College
