= John Ellis (scrivener) =

English scrivener and literary figure

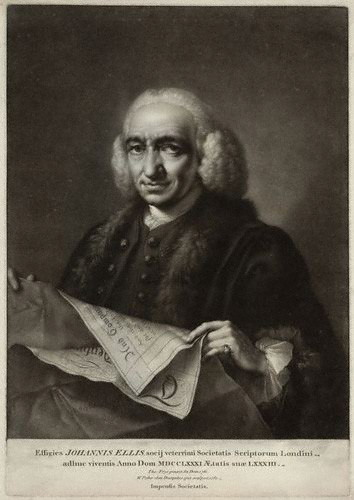
John Ellis, 1781 engraving by William Pether after Thomas Frye

John Ellis (1698–1791) was an English scrivener and literary figure.

== Life ==
He was the son of James and Susannah Ellis, born in the parish of St. Clement Danes, London, 22 March 1698. His father was unreliable, though a good swordsman; his mother, Susannah Philpot, was a strict dissenter. He was first sent to a day-school in Dogwell Court, Whitefriars, with a brother and two sisters, and later moved to another, not much superior, in Wine Office Court, Fleet Street. Here he learned the rudiments of grammar, and is said while at school to have translated a Latin poem of Payne Fisher entitled 'Marston Moore, sive de obsidione prœlioque Eboracensi carmen lib. 6,' 1660, which was published in 1750.

Ellis began his business career as clerk or apprentice to John Taverner, a scrivener in Threadneedle Street. He improved his knowledge of Latin by listening to the assistance which his master gave in his school-exercises to his son, who was a pupil at Merchant Taylors' School.

== In business and local government ==
The business of a scrivener was to make charters and deeds concerning lands and tenements and all other writings which by law are required to be sealed. Ellis outlived every member of the profession. On the death of his master Ellis succeeded to the business in partnership with young Taverner, whose imprudence involved him in loss. Ellis took an active part in the affairs of the Scriveners' Company, of which he was four times master.

Ellis was also for forty years an active member of the corporation of London, being elected a common councilman for Broad Street ward in 1750, and afterwards appointed alderman's deputy. The duties of the latter post he actively discharged until his resignation on St. Thomas's day 1790, not long before his death. In January 1765 he was an unsuccessful candidate for the office of chamberlain of London.

== Later life ==
Ellis lived for many years in Black Swan Court, and afterwards in Capel Court, Bartholomew Lane. Ellis was never married, and lived to an advanced age. Up to his eighty-fifth year he used frequently to walk thirty miles a day. James Boswell, who visited him 4 October 1790, in his ninety-third year, found his judgment distinct and clear and his memory "able to serve him very well after a little recollection". In the last year of his life his circumstances were reduced by a bankruptcy; but his friends relieved him.

Ellis died 31 December 1791, and was buried 5 January 1792 in the church of St Bartholomew by the Exchange.

== Associations ==
Early literary friends were Dr. William King of Oxford and his pupil Lord Orrery, with whom Ellis frequently exchanged visits. He also corresponded on intimate terms with the Rev. N. Fayting, master of Merchant Taylors' School and rector of St. Martin Outwich, their letters being frequently in verse. In 1742–3 he made a poetical translation of King's Templum Libertatis; like most of his literary efforts, it was not printed. Another close friend was Moses Mendez, who addressed to him a poetical epistle describing a journey to Ireland, which, with Ellis's reply, also in verse, was printed in a 'Collection of Poems,' published in 1767.

Chief among the circle of his literary friends and admirers was Samuel Johnson, who once said to Boswell, "It is wonderful, sir, what is to be found in London. The most literary conversation that I ever enjoyed was at the table of Jack Ellis, a money-scrivener behind the Royal Exchange, with whom I used to dine generally once a week." Ellis, though not ambitious to publish, continued writing verses for more than 70 years, and used to recite poems of a hundred lines after the age of 88.

== Works ==
Ellis's major work was a translation of the Epistulae ex Ponto of Ovid, which Johnson recommended that he publish. The few pieces he published were:

- The South Sea Dream, a poem in Hudibrastic verse.
- A verse translation from Latin of a broad jeu d'esprit entitled The Surprise, or the Gentleman turned Apothecary, 1739, originally written in French prose.
- A travesty of Maphæus, published in 1758.

He also contributed short pieces to Robert Dodsley's Collection of Poems by several hands, 6 vols., 1763, which were printed with his name in the last volume of the work. One of these, The Cheat's Apology, was set to music as a song by Joseph Vernon at Vauxhall Gardens, with much success. A short allegorical poem, Tartana, or the Plaidie, was printed in 1782 in the European Magazine. A number of his verses, composed at various times for John Boydell, Thomas Bowles, and other printers, were also printed.

With many unpublished poems, Ellis left behind him versions of Æsop and Cato, and of portions of Ovid's Metamorphoses. According to an unpublished poem addressed to Ellis by Moses Mendez, printed by "W. C." in Notes and Queries (4th ser. vii. 5), he used to attend at the Cock tavern in Threadneedle Street every Friday evening at eight o'clock to enjoy the society of his literary friends.
