= Thomas Ellis =

Thomas, Tom, or Tommy Ellis may refer to:

== Arts and entertainment ==
- Thomas Iorwerth Ellis (1899–1970), Welsh classicist
- Tom Ellis (journalist) (1932–2019), American radio and television news anchor
- Tom Ellis (actor) (born 1978), Welsh actor
- Thomas Sayers Ellis, American poet and photographer

== Law and politics ==
- Thomas Ellis (15th-century MP) (fl. 1421), English politician, MP for Kent
- Thomas Ellis (1569–1627), English politician, MP for Great Grimsby
- Thomas Ellis (Irish politician) (1774–1832), U.K. MP representing Dublin City
- Thomas Flower Ellis (1796–1861), English law reporter
- T. E. Ellis (1859–1899), Welsh politician
- Thomas Hobart Ellis (1894–1981), English Governor of East Pakistan
- Thomas F. Ellis (1920–2018), American lawyer and political activist
- Tom Ellis (politician) (1924–2010), British Member of Parliament
- T. S. Ellis III (1940–2025), American federal district judge
- Thomas J. Ellis (born 1959), American attorney and politician in Pennsylvania

== Sports ==
- Thomas Ellis (cricketer) (1828–?), English cricketer
- Tom Ellis (rugby league) (1904–1995), Australian rugby league footballer
- Tommy Ellis (born 1947), American NASCAR racing driver
- Tom Ellis (rugby union) (born 1994), English rugby union player

== Others ==
- Thomas Ellis (priest, died 1673) (1625–1673), Welsh clergyman
- Thomas Ellis (priest, died 1792) (1711/12–1792), Welsh clergyman
- Thomas Ellis (Irish emigrant) (fl. 1860s), Irish settler in British Columbia, Canada
- Tom Ellis (architect) (1911–1988), English architect
- Thomas Ellis (Tuskegee Airman) (1920–2018) American military pilot with Tuskegee Airmen

== See also ==
- Thomas Ellys (1685–1709), MP
