= James L. Ellis =

American politician born 1928

James L. Ellis (October 28, 1928-April 10 2017) was a U.S. Navy carrier pilot and state legislator in California. He served in the California Assembly and California Senate. He served in Vietnam. He was a Republican.

He was born in Tulsa, Oklahoma and moved with his family to Colorado. He attended Western State College and Colorado A&M College before training to become a Navy pilot. He married Barbara Gilligan and had four children. A Republican, he represented an area around San Diego.

He served in the California Assembly from 1977-1980 and in the California Senate from 1981-1988. The California State Archives have a collection of his papers.
