= Ellison =

- Pronunciation: /ˈɛlɪsən/
- Gender: Unisex
- Language: English

Origin
- Language: English or Norwegian
- Origin: Ellis + son
- Meaning: "Son of Elias" or "Son of Ellis"
- Region of origin: England and Norway

Other names
- Variant forms: Ellisson; Elisson; Elison; Ellyson; Ellysson; Elyson; Elysson
- Related names: Alison, Ellis, Elias, Ellie

Ellison is a surname and given name. It may derive from "Son of Elias" in Norwegian. Ellison can also be spelled Ellisson, Elison, Elisson, Ellyson, Ellysson, Elyson, and Elysson.

== People with the surname ==
- Andy Ellison, British musician
- Anne Corinne Colburn Ellison (died 1946), American lineage society leader
- Atiyyah Ellison (born 1981), American football player
- Brooke Ellison (1978–2024), American academic and disability advocate
- Casey Ellison, American actor
- Chase Ellison (born 1993), American actor
- Chris Ellison (disambiguation), multiple individuals
- David Ellison, American film producer
- Debbie Ellison, Playboy model
- Eileen Ellison, Grand Prix racer
- Frank Ellison, American model railroader
- George Ellison (disambiguation), multiple individuals
- Glenn Ellison, American professor
- Grace Ellison (died 1935), British journalist
- Harlan Ellison, writer
- Harold John Ellison, US naval ensign
- James Ellison (actor)
- James Ellison (footballer, born 1901)
- James Ellison (motorcycle racer)
- James T. Ellison, New York gangster
- Jason Ellison, Major League Baseball outfielder
- Jean Ellison, American baseball player
- Jennifer Ellison (born 1983), British actress
- Jeremiah Ellison, member of the Minneapolis City Council
- Joseph Ellison, Royal Navy officer
- Justice Ellison, American football player
- Keith Ellison (football), American football player
- Keith Ellison, member of the United States House of Representatives and Attorney General from Minnesota
- Larry Ellison, co-founder and CEO of Oracle Corporation
- Lorraine Ellison, singer
- Matt Ellison, Canadian ice hockey player
- Megan Ellison, American film producer
- Mervyn A. Ellison, Irish astronomer
- 'Omar Ellison, American football player
- Paul Ellison (disambiguation), multiple individuals
- Pervis Ellison, American basketball player
- Peter T. Ellison (born 1951), American anthropologist
- Ralph Ellison (1913–1994), American novelist, literary critic, scholar and writer, known for Invisible Man
- Richard Ellison (cricketer)
- Richard Ellison (politician) (1754–1827), British Member of Parliament
- Riki Ellison, New Zealand-American football player
- Robert Ellison (disambiguation), multiple individuals
- Scott Ellison (born 1954), American electric blues guitarist, singer and songwriter
- Sheila Ellison, American author on parenting and relationships
- Thomas Ellison, New Zealand rugby player
- Thomas Ellison (mutineer), English seaman
- William Ellison-Macartney (1852–1924), British and Australian politician
- William Frederick Archdall Ellison, Irish astronomer and clergyman

== People with the given name ==
- Ellison Barber (born 1989), American journalist
- Ellison Brown (1913–1975), U.S. Olympian
- Ellison Capers (1837–1908), Confederate general in the American Civil War
- Ellison Scotland Gibb (1879–1970), Scottish suffragette and chess player
- Ellison Goodall (born 1954), American long-distance runner
- Ellison Greenslade (born 1961), Bahamian police officer
- Ellison Harvie (1902–1984), Australian architect and advocate
- Ellison Hatfield, the younger brother of Devil Anse Hatfield, murdered by three sons of Randolph McCoy during the Hatfield-McCoy feud
- Ellison Hawks (1889–1971), British writer
- Ellison Hoover (1888–1955), American painter, lithographer and cartoonist
- Ellison Kelly (1935–2016), American-Canadian football player
- Ellison Ketchum (1908–1960), American football and basketball player, coach, and college athletics administrator
- Ellison "Cotton Top" Mounts, the illegitimate son of Ellison Hatfield, whose hanging is often seen as the end of the Hatfield-McCoy feud
- Ellison Onizuka (1946–1986), Asian-American astronaut killed on the Space Shuttle Challenger
- Ellison Pogo (1948–2013), Solomon Islands Anglican bishop
- Ellison Quirk (1866–1938), Australian politician
- Ellison Quity, Anglican bishop of Ysabel
- Ellison D. Smith (1864–1944), American politician
- Ellison G. Smith (1854–1935), a justice of the South Dakota Supreme Court
- E. A. Smyth (disambiguation)
- Ellison Tsang (born 2003), Hong Kong professional footballer

== See also ==
- Ellison (disambiguation)
- Ellis (disambiguation)
- Allison (disambiguation)
