= Ellison (disambiguation) =

Ellison is a surname and given name.

Ellison may also refer to:

== Places ==
=== United States ===
- Ellison's Cave
- Ellison, West Virginia
- Ellison Bay, Wisconsin
- Ellison Ridge, West Virginia
- Ellison Township, Warren County, Illinois

=== Canada ===
- Ellison Provincial Park
- Ellison, British Columbia

== Schools ==
- Ellison Boulters Academy
- Ellison Elementary School
- Ellison High School
- Ellison-White Conservatory of Music

== Other uses ==
- Ellison (band), an Indie rock band from Cincinnati, Ohio
- Ellison (crater), a lunar impact crater on the far side of the Moon
- Ellison Building, historian building
- Ellison Medical Foundation
- Ellison's Orange, cultivar apple
- Ellison-Mahon Aircraft, American aircraft company
- Ellison-Mahon Gweduck, Amphibious aircraft
- Ellison–Cliffe Lecture

== See also ==
- Ellisonia
- Ellisoniidae
- Ellis (disambiguation)
