= Elson =

Elson is both a surname and a given name. Notable people with the name include:

== Surname ==
- Andrea Elson (born 1969), actress
- Anita Elson (1898–1985), American dancer and singer
- Bob Elson (1904–1981), sportscaster
- David Elson, coach
- Diane Elson (born 1946), economist
- Edward L.R. Elson (1906–1993), minister
- Francisco Elson (born 1976), basketball player
- Jeremy Elson (born 1974), computer researcher
- Karen Elson (born 1979), model and singer
- Kate Elson (born 1979), model and filmmaker
- Kay Elson (born 1947), politician
- Louis C. Elson (1848–1920), music critic, music historian, author, composer, editor, journalist, and professor of music theory
- Peter Elson (Canadian politician) (1839–1913)
- Peter Elson (1947–1998), illustrator
- Pip Elson (born 1954), golfer
- Rachel Elson, journalist
- Rae Elson, activist
- Rebecca Elson (1960–1999), astronomer
- Richard Elson (born 1962), comic book artist
- Richard Mark Elson (born 1979), writer, director and editor
- Robert Elson, professor
- Roy Elson (1930–2010), politician
- William Elson (disambiguation), footballer

== Given name ==
- Élson Falcão da Silva (born 1981), football player
- Elson Becerra (1978–2006), football player
- Elson Floyd, educator
- Elson Kambalu, Malawian artist
- Elson Mendes, Cape Verdean footballer
- Elson Moyo, deputy commander of the Air Force of Zimbabwe
- Elson Seale, soccer player
- Elson Soh (born 1988), artist
- Elson-Dudley House
- Ellison
- Ellyson

== Places ==
- Elson, a small settlement near Gosport, Hampshire, England
  - Fort Elson

== See also ==
- Nelson (disambiguation)
