= Harold J. Ellison =

Harold J. Ellison may refer to:

- Harold John Ellison (1917–1942), United States Navy officer and Navy Cross recipient
- USS Harold J. Ellison, the name of more than one United States Navy ship
