= Robert Ellison =

Robert Ellison may refer to:

- Robert A. Ellison Jr. (1932–2021), American collector of ceramics
- Robert Ellison (politician) (1614–1678), English politician
- Robert Ellison (British Army officer) (1783–1843), British soldier of the Napoleonic Era who fought at the Battle of Waterloo
- Robert Ellison (Roman Catholic bishop) (1942–2024), Roman Catholic Bishop of the Diocese of Banjul, Gambia
- Robert Lee "Skip" Ellison, Druid priest, liturgist and author
- Bob Ellison (1933–2024), American screenwriter

== See also ==
- Ellison (surname)
