= Elsinho =

Elsinho is a nickname, a diminutive for Elson. It may refer to:

- Elsinho (footballer, born 1989), Elson Ferreira de Souza, Brazilian football right-back
- Elsinho (footballer, born 1991), Elson José Dias Júnior, Brazilian football defensive midfielder
