= USS Harold J. Ellison =

USS Harold J. Ellison has been the name of more than one United States Navy ship, and may refer to:

- USS Harold J. Ellison (DE-545), a destroyer escort cancelled during construction in 1944
- USS Harold J. Ellison (DD-864), was a destroyer in commission from 1945 to 1983
