= Emson =

Emson is a surname. Notable people with the surname include:

- Paul Emson (born 1958), English footballer
- Reginald Emson (1912–1995), British air marshal
- Tom Emson (born 2002), British racing driver

== See also ==
- Elson
- Emmson
