= Kenneth Price (disambiguation) =

Kenneth Price (1935–2012) was an American ceramist and printmaker.

Kenneth, Ken or Kenny Price may also refer to:

- Kenneth Lester Price Jr. (born 1943), American prelate of the Episcopal Church
- Ken Price (footballer, born 1939) (1939–2014), English football (soccer) player
- Ken Price (footballer, born 1954) (1954–2025), English football (soccer) player
- Ken Price (weightlifter) (1941–1999), British Olympic weightlifter
- Kenny Price (1931–1987), singer and actor
