= Ellison-Mahon Aircraft =

American aircraft company

- Company type: Aircraft development company
- Industry: Aviation
- Founded: Early 1990s in Seattle, Washington, USA
- Founder: Ben Ellison; Ross Mahon
- Headquarters: Seattle
- Key people: Ben Ellison, Ross Mahon
- Products: Ellison-Mahon Gweduck

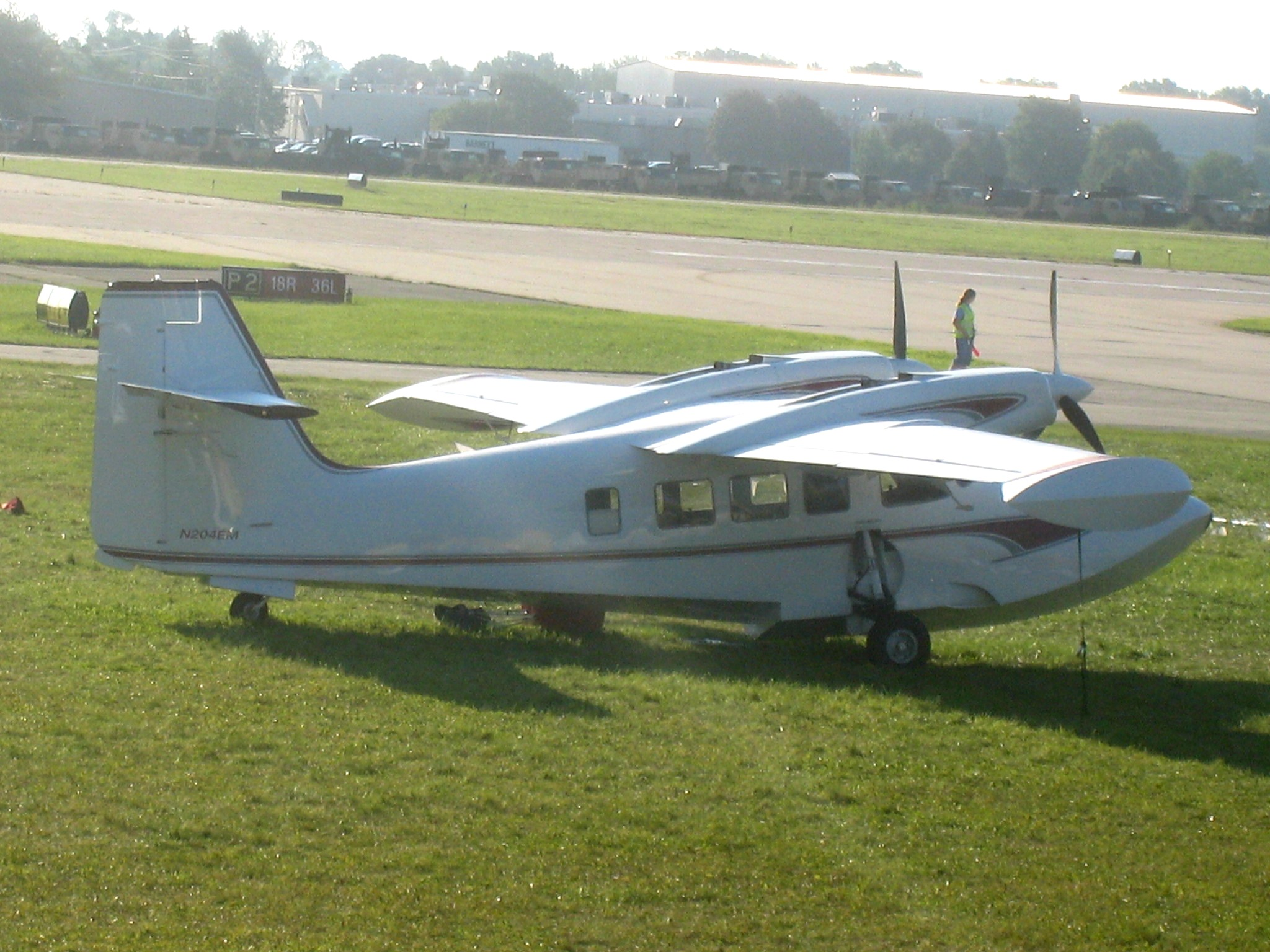
Gweduck on display

Ellison-Mahon Aircraft is an American aircraft development company located in the Seattle, Washington area. Its principals are Ben Ellison and Ross Mahon.

== Product line ==
In the early 1990s the designers began study of an amphibious aircraft. They settled on a twin-engine configuration similar to the Grumman Widgeon, which first flew in 1940, but planned on improving the takeoff characteristics and on using non-corroding materials for the structure. By 2006 they had built a composite-material prototype (FAA registration N204EM), which is based at the Renton Airport, and which uses nearby Lake Washington for water testing. The airplane is named Gweduck, borrowing on the name of the Native American shellfish that is indigenous to the Pacific Northwest. First flight of the prototype occurred on 2 May 2009.

The Ellison-Mahon Gweduck is a high-wing design, with two 300 hp (224 kW) Lycoming IO-540 engines mounted on the wing leading edge. It seats 6 to 8 people in 2-abreast seating. Wingspan is 50.5 ft (15.4 m) with tip floats in the flight (retracted) position, or 48.0 ft (14.63 m) with tip floats extended. The wing area is 295 ft² (27.4 m²). Fuselage length is 32.5 ft (9.91 m). Gross weight is 6000 pounds, empty weight is 4200 pounds.

To facilitate docking, the pilot can pump up to 150 lb (68 kg) of water into a tank in one wing, so that the opposite float can be stowed.

The aircraft is intended for the kitplane market.
