= The Ghost Who Walks (album) =

Studio album by Karen Elson
- Released: May 25, 2010
- Genre: Indie folk, alt.country, dark cabaret
- Label: XL, Third Man
- Producer: Jack White

Singles from The Ghost Who Walks
- 1. "The Ghost Who Walks" Released: 6 April 2010; 2. "The Truth Is in the Dirt"; 3. "Cruel Summer"; 4. "Pretty Babies"; 5. "The Birds They Circle"

Professional ratings
Review scores
Source	Rating
AllMusic	3.5/5 stars
BBC	(positive)

The Ghost Who Walks is the debut album from British supermodel and singer-songwriter Karen Elson. Elson told DJ Steve Lamacq: "The title was a nickname that I had at school. It was one of the nicer nicknames I had for being tall, pale and a little bit haunted."

The lead single from the album is title song, "The Ghost Who Walks".

== Tracks ==
1. "The Ghost Who Walks" (Elson)
2. "The Truth Is in the Dirt" (Elson)
3. "Pretty Babies" (Elson, Garniez)
4. "Lunasa" (Garniez)
5. "100 Years from Now" (Elson, Garniez, Bojadziev)
6. "Stolen Roses" (Elson)
7. "Cruel Summer" (Elson)
8. "Garden" (Elson)
9. "The Birds They Circle" (Elson)
10. "A Thief at My Door" (Elson)
11. "The Last Laugh" (Elson)
12. "Mouths to Feed" (Elson, Garniez)
13. "In Trouble with the Lord" (Elson) (iTunes bonus track)

== Chart performance ==
=== Album Charts ===
Chart (2010)	Peak position
Austrian Album Chart	72
Belgian Flanders Album Chart	76
Belgian Wallonia Album Chart	99
Greek Album Charts	30
Swiss Music Charts	39
US Billboard Heatseekers	16
UK Indie Chart	16
UK Independent Albums Breakers Top 20	2

=== Singles Charts ===
Year	Single	Chart	Peak Position
2010	"The Ghosts Who Walks"	UK Independent Singles Breakers Charts	#19
2010	"The Ghosts Who Walks"	NME Singles Charts	#14
