= Isaac Ellison =

Romanian businessman

Isaac Ellison

Isaac Ellison (1863 - 1928) was a Romanian businessman who was a leading member of the Jewish community in Singapore.

== Early life ==
Ellison was a native of Romania.

== Career ==
He came to Singapore prior to 1898. His dealings in shares and property were very successful, leading to him becoming very wealthy. He later became the proprietor of the International Restaurant in the Alkaff Arcade. He built the Ellison Building in 1924 for commercial purposes.

He was a race horse owner and imported his horses from England and Australia.

== Personal life and death ==
He was married to Flora Ellison. They had ten children.

In April 1928, he left Singapore and travelled to Karlovy Vary on vacation. However, while he was in Vienna, he was involved in an accident which resulted in his death.
