= The Citizens Band =

The Citizens Band is a New York City based political cabaret troupe made up of different rotating cast members and sometimes includes celebrities. Past participants have included Zoe Kravitz, Zooey Deschanel, Adam Crystal, Rain Phoenix, Maggie Gyllenhaal and Nina Persson. Founding members of the band include Karen Elson.

In September 2012 The Citizens Band released their debut album "Grab A Root And Growl", a "pro-democracy/ anti-voter apathy" themed recording produced by Nathan Larson.
