= Rachel Elson =

American journalist

- Born: New York, N.Y.
- Occupations: journalist and editor
- Notable credit(s): CBS MoneyWatch.com, MSN Money, the San Francisco Chronicle, Time Out New York, The Washington Post
- Awards: Gerald Loeb Award; 2009 Middle Class Crunch
- Website: Official website

Rachel F. Elson is an American journalist and editor-in-chief of Financial Planning Magazine and its associated website Financial-Planning.com. She was previously managing editor at Inc.com and CBS MoneyWatch.com. She is a recipient of the 2009 Gerald Loeb Award for Online excellence in business journalism for the story "Middle Class Crunch".

A graduate of the University of Pennsylvania, Elson was previously an editor at MSN Money, the New York Post, and Salon.com.

She has been a freelance editor and reporter whose articles have appeared in Time Out New York, The Washington Post, Salon.com, People.com, the New York Post and The San Francisco Examiner.
