= Lilly, West Virginia =

- Former settlement
- Location within West Virginia
- Coordinates: 37°35′00″N 80°58′29″W
- Country: United States
- State: West Virginia
- County: Summers
- Elevation: 1,601 ft (488 m)
- GNIS feature ID: 1556946

Lilly is a former settlement in Summers County, West Virginia, United States. Lilly was located on the Bluestone River, east of Ellison and appeared on maps as late as 1924. Today, the former town site is located in the Bluestone National Scenic River.

The community was named after the local Lilly (or DeLisle) family.
