= Elisson =

Elisson can be both a masculine given name and a surname. Notable people with the name include:

== Given name ==
- Elisson (footballer) (born 1987), Brazilian football goalkeeper

== Surname ==
- Bjarki Már Elísson (born 1990), Icelandic handball player
- Hendrik Elisson (1892–?), Estonian politician

== See also ==
- Ellison, unisex given name and surname
