= Paul Ellison =

Paul Ellison may refer to:

- Paul Ellison (bassist), American classical double-bassist
- Paul M. Ellison, British choral conductor, organist, and Beethoven scholar
- Paul J. Ellison, member of the Boston School Committee
