= De plane! De plane! =

Famous line in the television series "Fantasy Island"

"De plane! De plane!", or "The plane! The plane!", is a catchphrase originating from the opening titles of every episode of the U.S. TV series Fantasy Island (1977–1984). Each episode began with the diminutive Tattoo (played by Hervé Villechaize), one of the main characters, spotting the seaplane approaching the island and running up a tower and excitedly yelling, "De Plane! De Plane!" and ringing a bell.

== The aircraft ==
The plane as it appeared in January 2008 flying over the Ozark Mountains and Table Rock Lake near Berryville Arkansas

The aircraft used in the series was a SCAN 30, a license-built version of a Grumman G-44 Widgeon seaplane, U.S. registry N4453. It was manufactured by the Société de construction aéronavale (SCAN) in La Rochelle, France, in 1951, but had no engines because of unsatisfactory results achieved on previous SCAN Type 30 Widgeons with engines available there. Instead, it was disassembled and stored until 1967, when it was imported into the US, reassembled, and finally completed using nine-cylinder, 300 hp Lycoming model R-680 radial engines in what was called a Mansdorf Gannet conversion. It was one of the few Widgeons converted with radial engines.

The plane belonged to author Richard Bach, which he mentions briefly in his book The Bridge Across Forever (although he does not mention the television series by name, he makes it clear from the context that he is indeed talking about Fantasy Island).

It was rented for the show from a local charter company by a contract production company, and almost all of the footage of the plane used throughout the series and films was shot in one day and recycled over the entire run. During the filming of the actual episodes, the guests climbed out of a papier-mâché and plywood mock-up of the back of the plane.

The aircraft was later rented or sold to parties who used it to smuggle drugs into the United States, and it crashed in a swamp on at least one occasion. It was confiscated by the DEA and sold by the U.S. Marshals Service at auction. It again fell into the hands of other drug smugglers and was eventually confiscated and sold again. It had a gear-collapse accident in the 1990s, and was repainted deep red, so it is not as recognizable as De Plane of the television series when it was painted white. It was owned by the Ozarks Auto Show, Inc., a regional antique dealer, of Hollister, Missouri, and was stored in a hangar at the M. Graham Clark Downtown Airport near Branson, Missouri, along with several other special-interest aircraft. De Plane! has at times been on display on the airshow circuit in the American Midwest. The plane was sold at the 38th annual Branson Collector Car Auction on April 16, 2016, to an undisclosed buyer for $275,000.
