= Ellison Ridge, West Virginia =

Unincorporated community in West Virginia, United States

- Unincorporated community
- Location within West Virginia Location within the United States
- Coordinates: 37°34′38″N 81°02′25″W
- Country: United States
- State: West Virginia
- County: Summers
- Elevation: 2,904 ft (885 m)
- Time zone: UTC-5 (Eastern (EST))
  - Summer (DST): UTC-4 (EDT)
- Area codes: 304 & 681
- GNIS feature ID: 1554391

Ellison Ridge is an unincorporated community in Summers County, West Virginia, United States. Ellison Ridge is southwest of Hinton and southeast of Beckley.

Ellison Ridge is close to where the settlement of Lilly once stood before, which was abandoned when the Bluestone Dam project began. Ellison Ridge has a parking lot allowing access to the convergence of the Little Bluestone River and the Bluestone River. A pedestrian bridge across the Little Bluestone River which allows access to the footpath through Bluestone State Park.
