= George Ellison =

George Ellison may refer to:

- George Ellison (academic) (died 1557), Master of University College, Oxford, England (1551–1557)
- George Edwin Ellison (1878–1918), last British soldier to be killed in the First World War
- George Ellison (baseball) (1897–1978), American Major League Baseball pitcher
- George Robb Ellison (1881–1957), justice of the Supreme Court of Missouri

== See also ==
- Ellison
