= Robert A. Ellison Jr. =

American ceramics collector, 1932–2021

- Born: May 14, 1932; Fort Worth, Texas, U.S.
- Died: July 9, 2021 (aged 89); Manhattan, New York, U.S.
- Education: University of Texas at Austin
- Known for: Painting, ceramics collecting
- Movement: Abstract expressionism
- Spouses: Nancy Ellison (née Harrell) (m. 1957); Rosaire Appel (m. 1994)
- Children: 1

Robert A. Ellison Jr. (May 14, 1932 – July 9, 2021) was an American abstract painter, author, and collector of ceramics whose gifts of more than 600 works to the Metropolitan Museum of Art helped transform its ceramics holdings into one of the foremost collections in the world. A self-taught connoisseur, Ellison was also a scholar of the potter George Ohr and co-wrote a monograph on his work.

== Early life ==
Ellison was born on May 14, 1932, in Fort Worth, Texas, where he was also raised. His family had founded the Ellison Furniture & Carpet Co. in Fort Worth in 1888. He served in the United States Navy before earning a degree in philosophy from the University of Texas at Austin, where he began his artistic journey as a photographer.

== Artistic career ==
=== Fort Worth, New York, and the Tenth Street scene ===
Ellison spent a formative year in New York City in the late 1950s with his first wife, Nancy Ellison, forging early ties with Abstract Expressionists including Milton Resnick, Pat Passlof, Willem and Elaine de Kooning, Wolf Kahn, and Emily Mason. Around 1958, the Ellisons returned to Fort Worth and opened the Ellison Gallery on the ground floor of his family's furniture business, introducing artists of the New York School avant-garde to a Texas audience.

In 1959, after the Fort Worth Art Association declined to exhibit a nude painting by Ben Johnson on grounds of supposed vulgarity, Ellison displayed the work in the gallery's street-facing window alongside a sign reading, "This painting was rejected by the Fort Worth Art Association as being vulgar. What do you think?" Describing the act as a "protest for aesthetic freedom", he removed the painting after a few days following objections from a local ministers' association.

Following the sale of the family store, the Ellisons left Texas in 1962 and moved permanently to New York, settling in Manhattan's Lower East Side and later in Greenwich Village, where Ellison set up a live/work loft studio. He joined an artist community that also included Lester Johnson, and frequented poetry readings, art collectives, and happenings. He exhibited throughout the 1960s in New York and Texas galleries, including the Aegis Gallery, and joined the Twenty-Third Street Workshop Club, an evolution of the earlier Eighth Street Club.

A 2026 exhibition at Schoelkopf Gallery in New York, titled New York City Circa 1960: Works from the Collection of Robert A. Ellison, Jr. (May 8 – July 2, 2026), presented Ellison's own paintings alongside works by his contemporaries, placing his art within the scene around Tenth Street.

=== Painting style ===
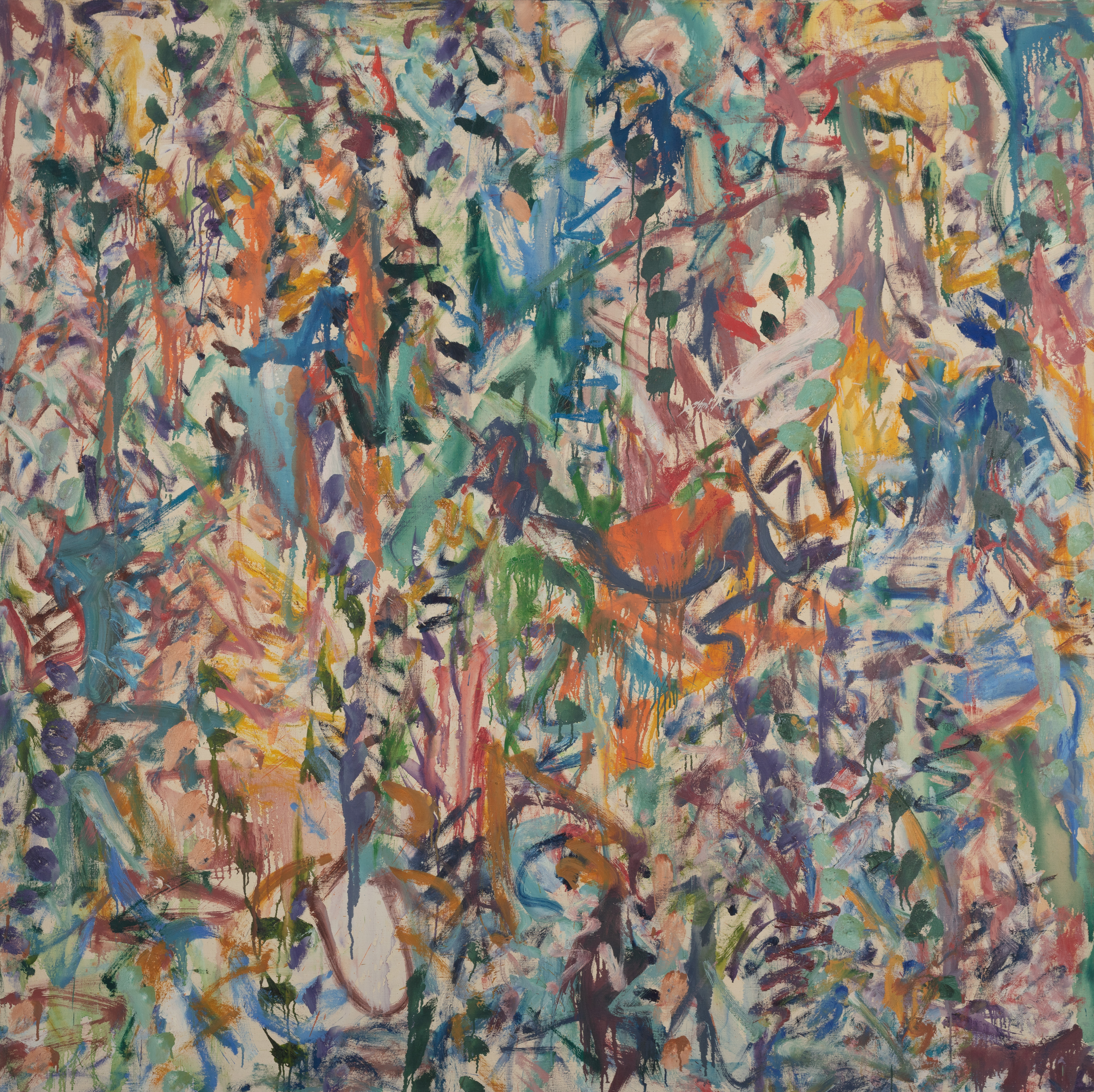
Robert A. Ellison Jr, Passion #3, 1965, Oil on canvas, 70 x 70 in; 177.8 x 177.8 cm

Ellison's paintings of the 1960s evolved out of the late Abstract Expressionist movement, with the work of Lester Johnson and Milton Resnick as significant influences. In the mid-1960s, he shifted from short, woven brushstrokes to large, individual strokes applied with a collage-like quality – a style described as like a non-representational neo-pointillism.

In 1971, Ellison took a brief pause from painting to work in clay at the Grand Street Potters in SoHo. By 1973, he had returned to painting with a new approach, abandoning the brush for a slender baton made of ash, cut from a sail batten. Using this tool for semi-controlled splattering of paint while the canvas hung on the wall, he achieved a three-dimensional surface composed of small fragments of color. He continued to paint in this signature "splatter" style through the mid-1980s, exhibiting at galleries including the Landmark Gallery in SoHo. His paintings of the 1970s and 1980s are represented by Westbrook Modern in Carmel, California.

== Ceramics collecting ==
Ellison began collecting ceramics in the 1960s, initially not knowing the formal classifications of what he was acquiring. "I started out not knowing anything, so everything I've learned has been self-discovered," he told ARTnews in 2021. "I don't have advisers or a curator or an assistant or anything like that. I'm just one guy doing it all myself."

He described himself as a "serial collector", finding one area of ceramics, collecting and contextualizing it, and then moving on to another. Two events in the early 1970s sharpened his focus: a 1972 exhibition on American art pottery at Princeton University, and the 1974 publication of Paul Evans's book Art Pottery of the United States. Using his eye for form, color, and texture, Ellison built what curator Alice Cooney Frelinghuysen described as "arguably one of the best" collections of American and European art pottery in the United States.

=== George Ohr ===
In 1974, Ellison encountered his first work by George Ohr, the eccentric Biloxi-based potter later known as "The Mad Potter of Biloxi", at a friend's antique shop. "I was just bowled over", Ellison recalled. He purchased the piece – a small, hand-pinched pitcher – for $100 or less. This discovery became a defining passion; Ellison subsequently introduced Ohr's work to his friend Milton Resnick and dedicated years to researching Ohr's life and artistic motivations.

With Garth Clark and Eugene Hecht, Ellison co-wrote the monograph The Mad Potter of Biloxi: The Art and Life of George E. Ohr (1989), which became a key scholarly resource on the artist.

== Metropolitan Museum of Art donations ==
In 2009, Ellison donated about 300 pieces of American art pottery to the Metropolitan Museum of Art (Met). The collection, spanning works from 1876 to 1956, was described by the museum as helping to create "one of the great repositories of Art Pottery in the world".

In 2013, Ellison made a further gift of European pottery to the Met. His final major donation, 125 works of modern and contemporary ceramic art, was made in honor of the museum's 150th anniversary and formed the basis of the 2021 exhibition Shapes from Out of Nowhere: Ceramics from the Robert A. Ellison Jr. Collection, curated by Adrienne Spinozzi. The exhibition featured works by 49 artists, including Peter Voulkos, Ken Price, Toshiko Takaezu, Lynda Benglis, and eight works by George Ohr.

In total, Ellison's gifts to the Metropolitan Museum exceeded 600 objects spanning several centuries.

== Personal life ==
Ellison married Nancy Ellison in 1957; they shared his early years between New York and Fort Worth. He met the artist Rosaire Appel in 1983; they married in 1994.

Ellison died on July 9, 2021, at the age of 89..

== Selected books ==
- Ellison, Robert A.; Adamson, Glenn (2021). Shapes from Out of Nowhere: Ceramics from the Robert A. Ellison Jr. Collection. New York: August Editions. ISBN 978-1-947359-06-2.
- Frelinghuysen, Alice Cooney; Eidelberg, Martin; Spinozzi, Adrienne (2018). American Art Pottery: The Robert A. Ellison Jr. Collection. New York: Metropolitan Museum of Art. ISBN 978-1588395962.
- Ellison, Robert A. (2006). George Ohr, Art Potter: The Apostle of Individuality. London: Scala Publishers. ISBN 978-1857594256.
- Clark, Garth; Ellison, Robert A.; Hecht, Eugene (1989). The Mad Potter of Biloxi: The Art and Life of George E. Ohr. New York: Abbeville Press. ISBN 0896599272.

== Exhibitions ==
- Making Pottery Art (2014 French ceramics show), Metropolitan Museum of Art, 2014
- Shapes from Out of Nowhere: Ceramics from the Robert A. Ellison Jr. Collection, Metropolitan Museum of Art, 2021
- Languages: Rosaire Appel and Robert Ellison – A Life in Art & Collecting, Sculpture Space NYC, New York, 2025
- New York City Circa 1960: Works from the Collection of Robert A. Ellison, Jr., Schoelkopf Gallery, New York, 2026
