= Paul M. Ellison =

British musicologist and choir director

Paul M. Ellison FRHistS
- Born: March 27, 1956 (age 70); New Brighton, UK
- Occupations: Musicologist; choral conductor; organist
- Known for: President of the American Beethoven Society

Academic background
- Education: Royal Academy of Music; Queens' College, Cambridge; San Jose State University; Cardiff University

Academic work
- Discipline: Musicology
- Sub-discipline: Beethoven studies, tonal affect
- Institutions: San Francisco State University; San Jose State University; Church of the Advent of Christ the King

Paul M. Ellison (born 27 March 1956 in New Brighton, UK) is a British and American choral conductor, organist, and Beethoven scholar currently working in the United States. He is a lecturer in musicology at San Francisco State University and San Jose State University His area of specialty is tonal affect and meaning in Classical and Romantic period music.

== Early life and education ==
Ellison attended Godalming Grammar School, going on to study musicology and organ at the Royal Academy of Music, where was awarded the Peter Latham Scholarship for musicology and the Alan Kirby Prize for choir training. He received his BMus and DipRAM in 1978 and spent a postgraduate year at Queens’ College, Cambridge, from 1978 to 1979, where he gained a PGCE. He held positions as assistant organist at St. Pancras Church and St. Mary at Hill during this time. He later studied at San José State University (MA, 2003) and Cardiff University, where he gained his PhD in 2010 with a dissertation entitled “The Key to Beethoven: Connecting Tonality and Meaning in his Music” subsequently published by Pendragon Press in 2014.

== Professional career ==
Ellison has maintained a dual career in academia and church music. Since 2002, he has been a lecturer in musicology at San Francisco State University, also holding a similar position at San José State University since 2016. At SJSU, he has worked on The Beethoven Journal (editor, 2016–19, currently associate editor) and is founding co-editor of The Beethoven Newsletter, both American Beethoven Society publications. He is a regular speaker at the Three Choirs Festival. From 1981 to 1987, he was director of music at St Mary the Boltons church prior to emigrating to the USA. Since 1990, he has been director of music at Church of the Advent of Christ the King, San Francisco's historic Anglo-Catholic parish. There he founded the professional ensemble Schola Adventus, with whom he toured southern England in 2005 and released the first ever recording of Palestrina’s Missa Confitebor tibi Domine as part of the CD Palestrina for Eight Voices.

He is a contributor to Nineteenth Century Music Review, The Cambridge Encyclopedia of Historical Performance in Music, Oxford Music Online, Notes, and The Beethoven Journal and The Beethoven Newsletter.

== Honours ==
Ellison has been a member of the Association of Anglican Musicians since 1994. From 2010–15, he served as editor of The Journal, and in 2016 was elected vice president, going on to serve as 36th president from 2017-19. He was appointed president of the American Beethoven Society in July 2023. In February 2025, he was elected a Fellow of the Royal Historical Society (FRHistS).

== Bibliography ==
=== Books ===
- Dear Max/Lieber Malcolm, editor/annotator (Hillsdale, NY: Pendragon Press, 2010).
- The Key to Beethoven: Connecting Tonality and Meaning in his Music

=== Articles ===
- “Affective Organization in Beethoven’s Gellert Lieder, Opus 48, The Beethoven Journal, Vol. 25, No. 1 (Summer 2010): 19–31.
- “The Largo/Allegro from Beethoven’s “Tempest” Sonata, Op. 31, No. 2: Affective Tonality as a Key to Meaning, The Beethoven Journal, Vol. 27, No. 1 (Summer 2012): 13–25.
- "Specter of Nazi Past Haunts ‘Ode to Joy’ at Mauthausen," The Beethoven Journal, Vol. 15, No.1 (Summer 2000): 25–28.
- "Key Character". The Cambridge Encyclopedia of Historical Performance in Music. Cambridge University Press.
- "Gustav Nottebohm". The Cambridge Encyclopedia of Historical Performance in Music. Cambridge University Press
- “Beethoven and Schenker: Unraveling Those Graphs, The Beethoven Journal, Vol 16, No. 2 (Winter 2001): 69–73.
- “Beethoven’s Elegischer Gesang: Another ‘Quiet Herald’ of the Late Style,” The Beethoven Newsletter (Summer 2020): 10–15.
- “Roger Woodward,” in Grove Music Online, ed. Deane Root, accessed January 1, 2024,
- "Key Character." in Grove Music Online, accessed February 2, 2025.

=== Selected recordings ===
- Palestrina for eight voices.
