= Chris Ellison =

Chris Ellison may refer to:

- Chris Ellison (actor) (born 1946), English actor
- Chris Ellison (businessman) (born c. 1957), New Zealand entrepreneur
- Chris Ellison (politician) (born 1954), member of the Australian Senate
- Chris Ellison (cricketer) (born 1979), English cricketer
