= USS Harold J. Ellison (DE-545) =

History

United States
- Name: USS Harold J. Ellison
- Namesake: Ensign Harold John Ellison (1917-1942), a U.S. Navy officer and Navy Cross recipient
- Builder: Boston Navy Yard, Boston, Massachusetts
- Laid down: date unknown
- Launched: Never
- Commissioned: Never
- Fate: Construction contract cancelled 10 June 1944; Scrapped incomplete

General characteristics
- Class & type: John C. Butler-class destroyer escort
- Displacement: 1,350 tons
- Length: 306 ft (93 m)
- Beam: 36 ft 8 in (11 m)
- Draft: 9 ft 5 in (3 m)
- Propulsion: 2 boilers, 2 geared turbine engines, 12,000 shp; 2 propellers
- Speed: 24 knots (44 km/h)
- Range: 6,000 nmi. (12,000 km) @ 12 kt
- Complement: 14 officers, 201 enlisted
- Armament: 2 × single 5 in (127 mm) guns; 2 × twin 40 mm (1.6 in) AA guns; 10 × single 20 mm (0.79 in) AA guns; 1 × triple 21 in (533 mm) torpedo tubes; 8 × depth charge throwers; 1 × Hedgehog ASW mortar; 2 × depth charge racks

USS Harold J. Ellison (DE-545) was a proposed World War II United States Navy John C. Butler-class destroyer escort that was never completed.

Harold J. Ellison's keel was laid at the Boston Navy Yard in Boston, Massachusetts. However, her construction was cancelled on 10 June 1944 before she could be launched. The incomplete ship was scrapped.

The name Harold J. Ellison was reassigned to the destroyer USS Harold J. Ellison (DD-864).
