= Karen Elson =

English model, singer and songwriter (born 1979)

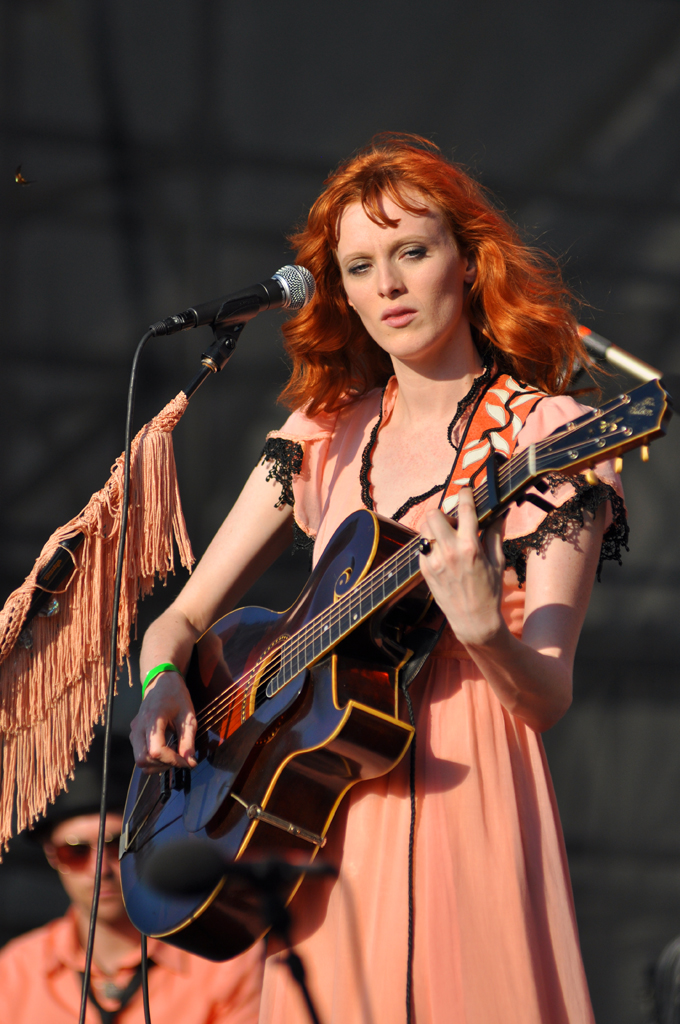
- Elson in 2010
- Born: 14 January 1979 (age 47); Oldham, Greater Manchester, England
- Occupations: Model; singer; songwriter
- Years active: 1995–present
- Spouses: Jack White (m. 2005; div. 2013); Lee Foster (m. 2024)
- Children: 2
- Modelling information
- Height: 1.75 m (5 ft 9 in)
- Hair colour: Red
- Eye colour: Blue

Karen Jill Elson (born 14 January 1979) is an English model, singer, and songwriter.

== Early life and education ==
Elson was born in Oldham, Greater Manchester, and attended North Chadderton School as a child. She has a fraternal twin sister, filmmaker Kate Elson.

== Career ==
=== Modelling ===
Elson was discovered at age 16 by Debra Burns, the owner of Boss Model Management in Manchester. She began modelling locally and left Oldham a year later. Steven Meisel photographed Elson for the cover of Italian Vogue on her 18th birthday, thus launching her career worldwide. She has worked with most of the world's major fashion photographers and fashion designers, including Arthur Elgort, Bruce Weber, Mario Testino, Peter Lindbergh, Mert and Marcus, Steven Klein, Patrick Demarchelier, Helmut Newton and Ellen Von Unwerth.

Elson's runway modelling credits include: Marc Jacobs, Jean-Paul Gaultier, Chanel, Dolce & Gabbana, Versace, Tom Ford, YSL, Alexander McQueen, Dior, Anna Sui, and Gucci.

Elson has over 30 magazine covers to her credit—international editions of Vogue, W, Dazed & Confused, Numéro, Harper's Bazaar (British), Marie Claire, Elle, Lula, Foam, and Nylon. In September 2008, Elson was on the cover of British Vogue as "Fashion's Red Queen".

In 1997, Elson won the title of Model of the Year at the VH1 Fashion Awards. The September 2004, cover of American Vogue featured her as one of the "Models of the Moment". In 2005, she won the British Fashion Award for Best Model.

It was then announced that Elson was the new face of British department store John Lewis for autumn/winter 2008–2009. In the autumn of 2009, she appeared on billboards internationally for H&M.

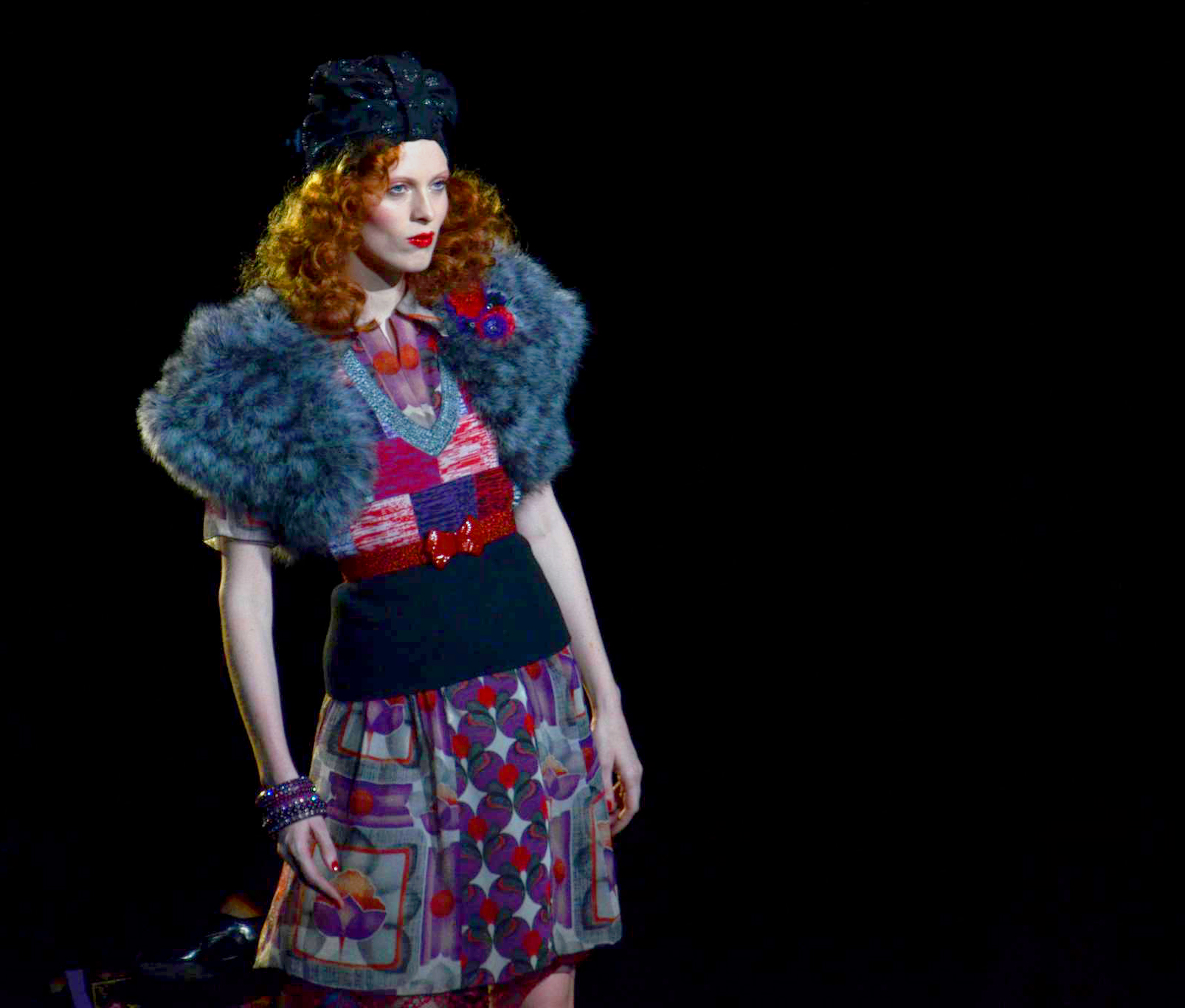
Elson models at an Anna Sui show in 2011

She has been in ad campaigns for Yves Saint Laurent, Jean Paul Gaultier, Louis Vuitton, Versace, Christian Dior, Burberry, Trussardi, Roberto Cavalli, Lanvin, and Chanel. For the Tom Ford 2009 spring eyewear advertising campaign, she was photographed, for the first time, by Ford himself. She was the 2010 face for American fashion brand St. John and Karen appeared with sister Kate in the 2011 H&M Holiday campaign. That same year, she was part of Banana Republic's 2011 Holiday Collection. Her cosmetic advertising credits are YSL's Opium perfume and Kose Cosmetics.

Elson is currently the face of Jo Malone London and represents them worldwide.

Elson has appeared in many short films and videos, including the music video for the White Stripes song, "Blue Orchid". She has also appeared in fashion films: War Opera, Nick Knight's Andy Warhol-inspired series More Beautiful Women, Craig McDean's 48 Girls, and Bruce Weber's Petit Fleur, Harlequin, Voodoo Daddy, Closer Walk With Thee and Karen's Boogie (all films were made in conjunction with W as a tribute to New Orleans).

She acted in the short film Lay Down Lean, a project by the experimental filmmaking team Belles of the Black Diamond Field.

Elson has contributed to Nick Knight's fashion site SHOWstudio.com since 2002. She also contributed to Knight's project "Moving Fashion" with a black and white video of herself in a sequined gown, perched upon a swing. The images were accompanied by Elson playing the autoharp and singing a verse of Marlene Dietrich's "Falling in Love Again."

In 2010, she modelled a Patricia Field dress for the Sex and the City Archive in the Naomi Campbell's Fashion for Relief runway show for the White Ribbon Alliance, an organisation aiding mothers in Haiti.

Elson has designed her own line of shoes, bags and jewellery for fashion brand Nine West.

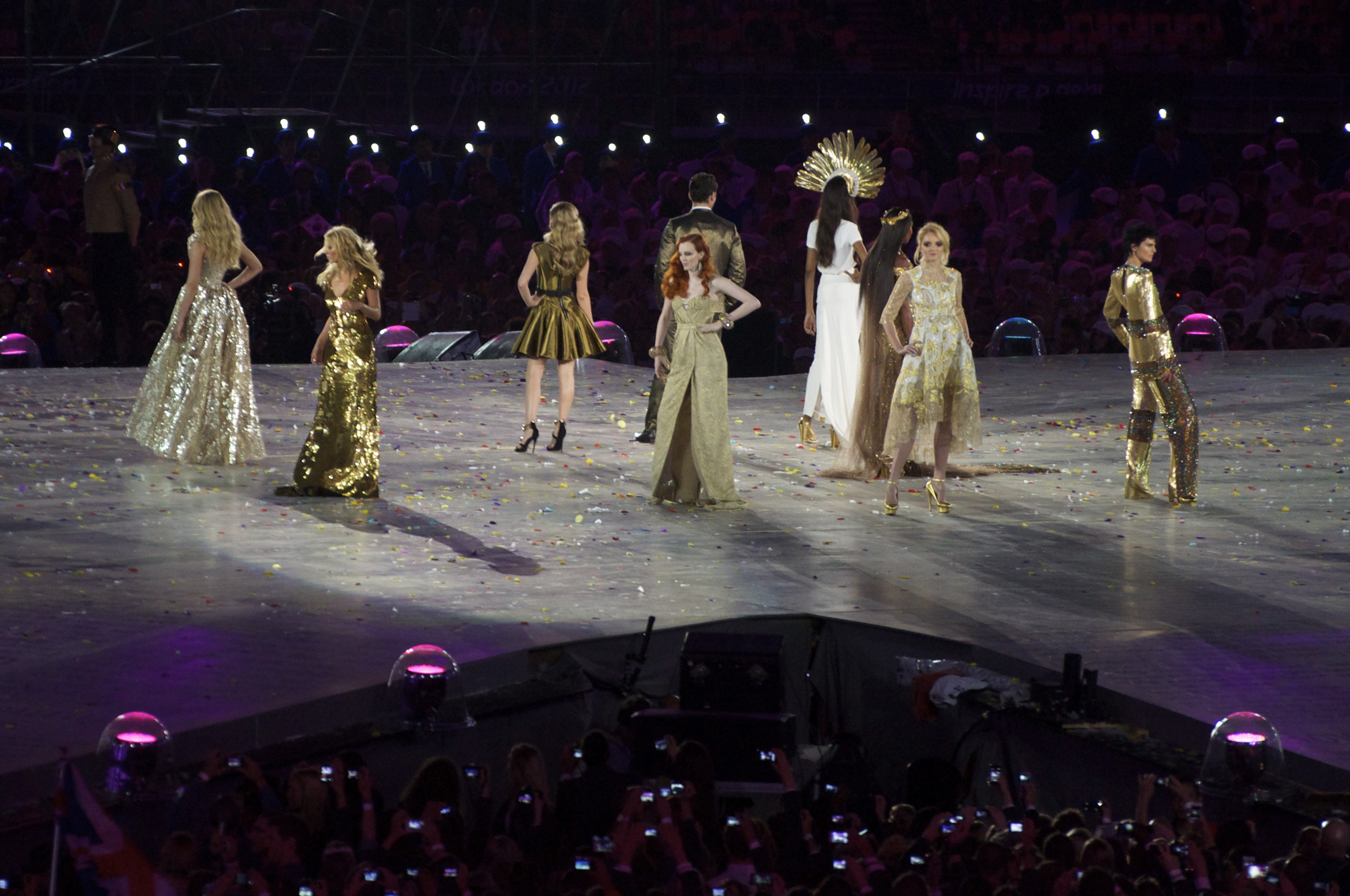
Elson, Kate Moss, Naomi Campbell, Lily Cole, Jourdan Dunn, Georgia May Jagger, David Gandy and Stella Tennant pose during the closing ceremony of the 2012 London Summer Olympics

Elson was one of eight British models chosen to walk during a segment at the 2012 Summer Olympics closing ceremony. She wore a gold gown by Burberry and walked the stadium with her fellow models to David Bowie's song "Fashion."

=== Music ===
Elson is a founding member and performer with the New York-based political cabaret troupe the Citizens Band, appearing with them at various theatres as well as the downtown art gallery Deitch Projects since 2004. Critical response to Elson's performances have been unequivocally positive, with the press frequently commenting on her striking vocal skills.

As one of the leaders of the Citizens Band she has performed a variety of songs including covers of the Velvet Underground, Kurt Weill, Elvis Presley, Mimi and Richard Fariña, Pete Seeger, Leonard Cohen, Neil Young and Marlene Dietrich. She has also written and co-written songs for the troupe's performances. Her cover of the Velvet Underground's "Candy Says" is available on the Citizen Band's MySpace page. Short samples of her performances are available on the troupe's website as well.

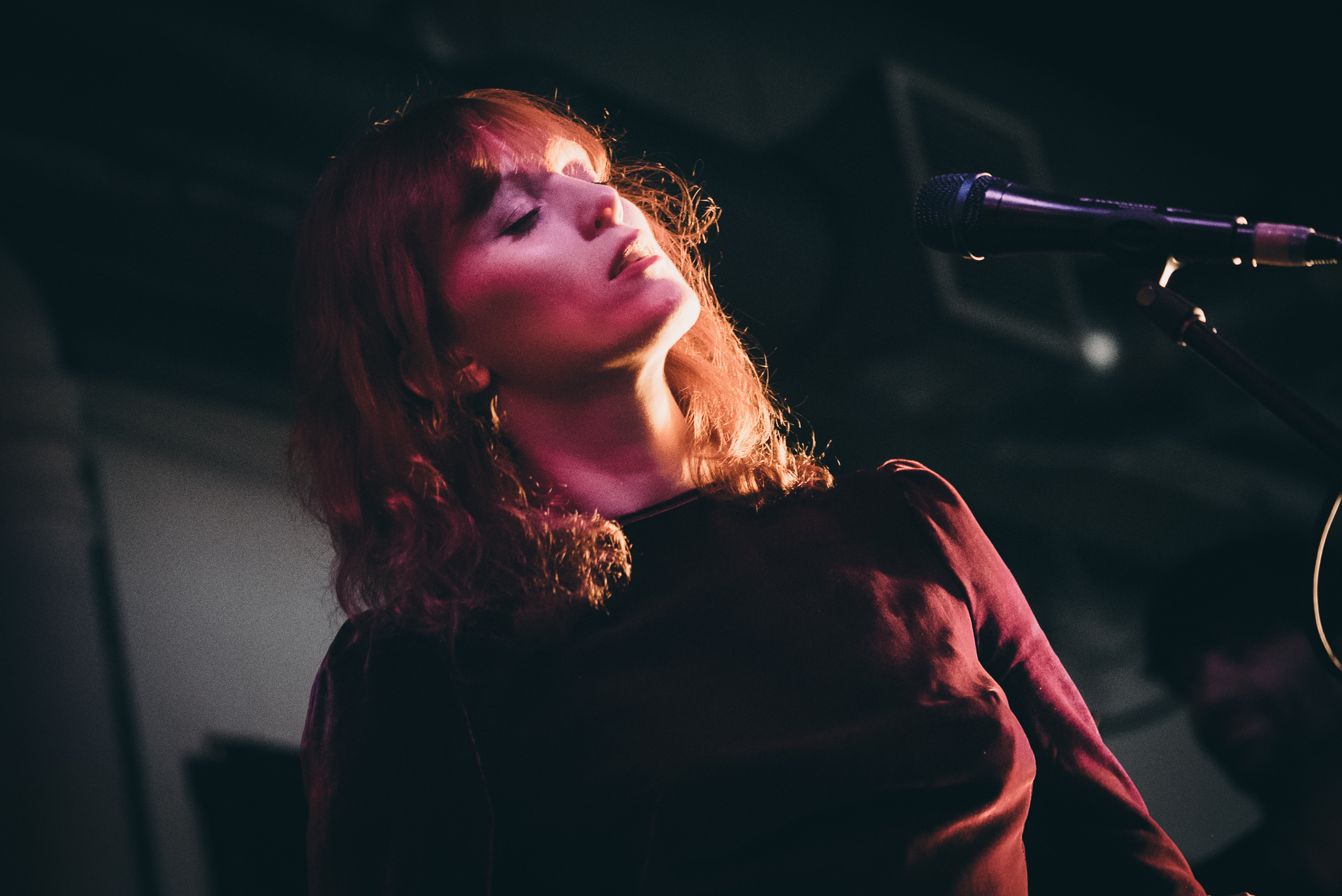
Elson performing at Rough Trade East in 2017

Elson contributed backing vocals to a remix of Robert Plant's "Last Time I Saw Her" from Plant's album Dreamland in 2002. In 2005, a personal recording of Elson singing "Coming Down" was made available on a CD accompanying the August 2005 issue of Uncut magazine. The song was chosen by REM singer Michael Stipe. She sang a duet with Cat Power of "I Love You (Me Either)" for Monsieur Gainsbourg Revisited, a tribute album to French singer-songwriter Serge Gainsbourg.

Her first full-length album was written, for the most part, in secret without letting her then-husband Jack White hear what she was doing. "At home I would hide—I would play my songs really in isolation. I would lock the bathroom door and hide. Eventually he was like, 'Why are you hiding this from me?'". Elson released her debut solo album The Ghost Who Walks in May 2010, via White's label, Third Man Records. It received generally favourable reviews. Spin magazine gave it 7/10 and compared her voice to both Jenny Lewis and Loretta Lynn. Elson and her band performed on the Late Show with David Letterman in September 2010.

Elson has recorded numerous cover songs throughout her career including "Season of the Witch" by Donovan (included in the HBO TV series True Blood episode "If You Love Me, Why Am I Dyin'?"), "Vicious" by Lou Reed (released for Record Store Day 2011), "Milk and Honey" by Jackson C. Frank (released for Record Store Day 2012), "Crying, Waiting, Hoping" by Buddy Holly (for the tribute album Rave on Buddy Holly), "Gold Dust Woman" by Fleetwood Mac (for the album Just Tell Me That You Want Me: A Tribute to Fleetwood Mac), "If I Had a Boat" by Lyle Lovett (in closing credits of the 2014 movie Still Alice).

In September 2012, she was featured in a campaign called "30 Songs / 30 Days" to support Half the Sky: Turning Oppression into Opportunity for Women Worldwide, a multi-platform media project inspired by Nicholas Kristof and Sheryl WuDunn's book. Fringe included Elson's song "The Ghost Who Walks" on their season 4 episode "A Better Human Being".

Elson opened for Neko Case in October 2013, for eight shows in Case's North American tour.

Her second solo album, Double Roses, was released in 2017. Her third, Green, was released in 2022.

== Personal life ==
Elson was married to American musician Jack White, with whom she has two children, from 2005 to 2013. Their daughter, Scarlett, walked on the runway at Paris Fashion Week 2025.

In 2024, Elson married Electric Lady Studios owner Lee Foster. They reside in Nashville, Tennessee.

She is an ambassador for Save the Children and has travelled to Sierra Leone, the Middle East and the Ivory Coast. She has written articles and appeared on CNN to advocate for child rights.

Elson published an autobiography, The Red Flame (2020), in which she details her childhood eating disorder, personal struggles and her career.

== Filmography ==
Music videos
Year	Title	Artist	Role	Note
2005	Blue Orchid	the White Stripes	Herself	
2025	Gorgeous	Doja Cat	Herself	

== Discography ==
=== Albums ===
- The Ghost Who Walks – Third Man Records/XL Recordings – 2010
- Double Roses – H.O.T. Records/1965 Records – 2017
- Green – Big Yellow Dog Music – 2022

=== EP ===
- Radio Redhead, Vol. 1 – 2020
