= CBS MoneyWatch =

Personal finance website

- Country of origin: United States
- Original language: English

Production
- Production locations: New York, New York
- Production companies: CBS News (Skydance Corporation)

Original release
- Network: CBS
- Release: 2009

CBS MoneyWatch, a division of CBS News and a property of Skydance Corporation, is a personal finance website that provides advice on retirement, investing, money, work and real estate, originating from CBS's banner for its business news reporting. Launched in April 2009, the site was originally an extension of BNET.com, formerly known as the CBS Interactive Business Network. In November 2011, BNET and CBS MoneyWatch merged and migrated to the CBSNews.com platform. The executive editor of CBS MoneyWatch is Glenn Coleman.

== See also ==
- MarketWatch, a similar site which also originated from CBS News and is now a division of Dow Jones & Company
