= William Elson =

William Elson may refer to:

- Billy Elson, footballer
- William Elson (died 1705), MP for Chichester
- William Elson (died 1727), MP for Chichester
