= Kate Elson =

British model and filmmaker

- Born: 14 January 1979 (age 47); Oldham, Greater Manchester, England
- Occupations: Model; filmmaker
- Years active: 1995–present
- Modelling information
- Height: 5 ft 10 in (178 cm)
- Hair colour: Brown
- Eye colour: Blue

Kate Elson (born 14 January 1979) is a British model and filmmaker. She is the fraternal twin sister of fashion model Karen Elson.

== Early life ==
Elson was born in Oldham, Greater Manchester. As a child, she went to North Chadderton School in Chadderton with her twin sister, model Karen Elson. Kate began her modelling career in 1995 when she and her sister were scouted by Boss Model Management in Manchester.

== Modelling career ==
Elson has walked the runways for fashion designers including Balenciaga, Lagerfeld Gallery, Moschino, Betsey Johnson, Jill Stuart, Julien MacDonald, Dolce & Gabbana, Matthew Williamson, Marc by Marc Jacobs, and DKNY. She has appeared in international campaigns for Anne Klein, Banana Republic, Blumarine, Cacharel, Pringle of Scotland, and Prada.

Elson is currently represented by Boss Models and Independent Talent Group Ltd.. In the past, Elson has been represented by Munich Models.

== Film career ==
In 2001, Elson took part of the SHOWstudio project, Sleep. The object was to take nine top models and have them participate in the first global live fashion shoot: "The girls were dressed by stylists, had their hair, make-up and nails groomed, and were put to bed in their separate hotel rooms. SHOWstudio viewers logged on at midnight and through the night as the models' gentle slumber and gradual dishevelment was recorded in a series of intimate stills."

In 2004, in conjunction with Anne Taylor's 50th Anniversary I AM ANNE TAYLOR photoshoot, Kate created a short film for the Anne Taylor website.

Elson has also executive produced The Rope (2005) and The Spirit (2007) directed by Joseph Fiennes.

== Personal life ==
Kate Elson is the twin sister of Karen Elson, a model and musician.
