= Sheila Ellison =

American writer

Sheila Ellison is an American author and a speaker on issues relating to parenting and relationships.

== Biography ==
Ellison appeared on CBS News in 2002 as a relationship consultant. In the same year, her book, The Courage to Love Again, was favorably reviewed by Publishers Weekly.

== Publications ==
=== Activity and child-rearing books ===
- 365 Games Babies Play
- 365 Games Toddlers Play, Nov 2003
- 365 Days Of Creative Play (with Judith Gray), April 1995
- 365 Afterschool Activities
- 365 Foods Kids Love to Eat(with Judith Gray), July 2001
- 365 Ways to Raise Great Kids (with Barbara Ann Barnett), September 1998
- 365 Games Smart Babies Play (with Susan Ferdinandi), June 2005
- 365 Smart Afterschool Activities (with Judith Gray), September 2005
- 365 Games Smart Toddlers Play, April 2006
- 365 Ways To Raise Confident Kids

=== Self-help and relationship books ===
- The Courage to be a Single Mother
- Becoming Whole Again after Divorce
- The Courage to Love Again
- Creating Happy, Healthy Relationships after Divorce
- How Does She Do It? 101 Life Lessons from One Mother to Another

=== As editor ===
- If Women Ruled the World, September 2004
