= Elson-Dudley House =

Historic house in Mississippi, United States

- U.S. National Register of Historic Places
- U.S. Historic district – Contributing property
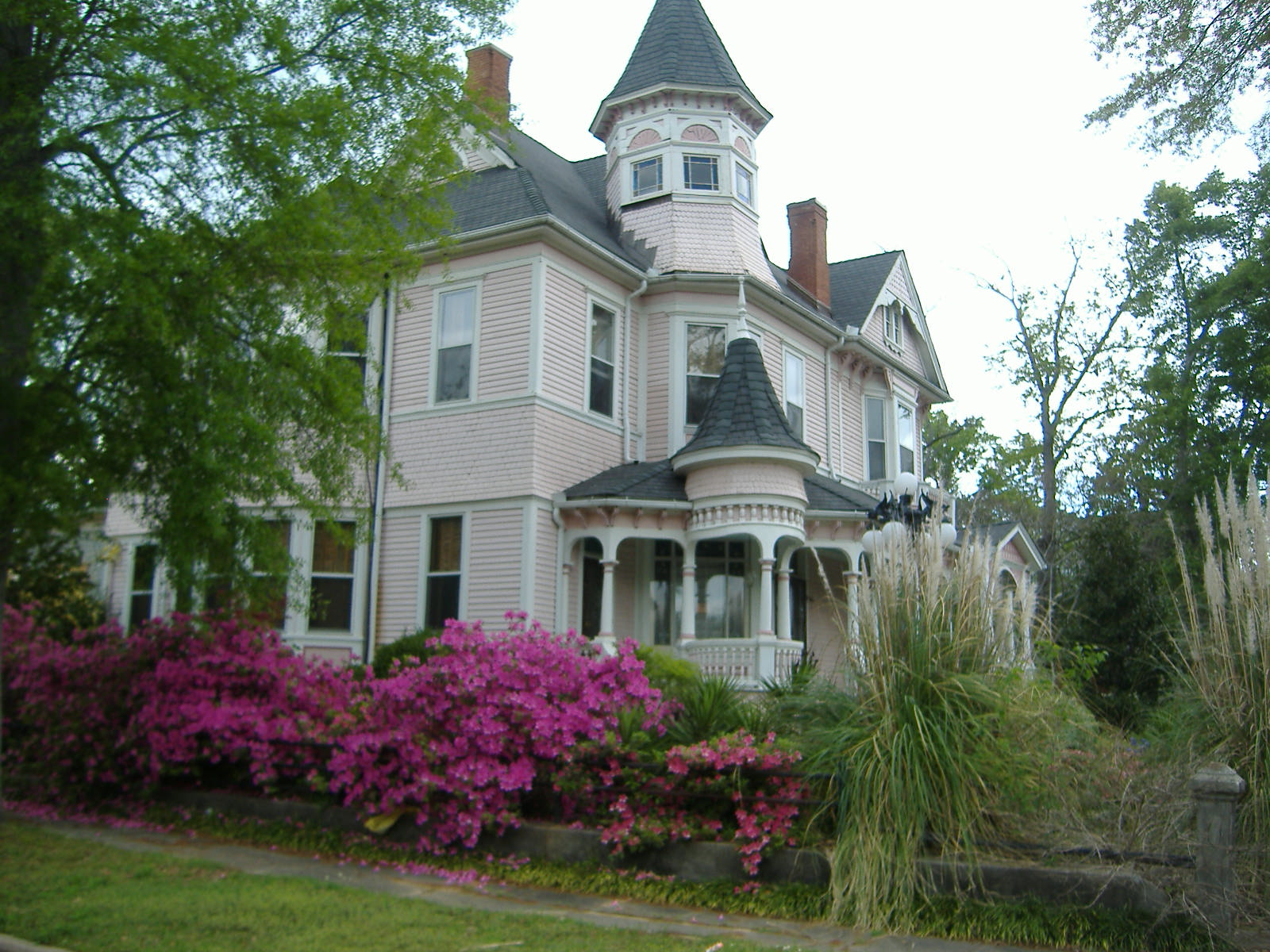

- Location within Mississippi Location within the United States
- Interactive map showing the location of Elson-Dudley House
- Location: Meridian, Mississippi
- Coordinates: 32°22′4″N 88°42′27″W
- Area: 5,000 sq ft (465 m^{2})
- Built: 1885
- Architectural style: Stick/Eastlake movement
- Part of: Merrehope Historic District (ID88000973)
- MPS: Meridian MRA
- NRHP reference No.: 79003390
- Added to NRHP: December 18, 1979

The Elson-Dudley House is a historic home located at 1101 29th Avenue, Meridian, Mississippi. Built in 1894 by Julius and Dora Neubauer Elson, some of Meridian's earliest settlers, the home is a Victorian Eastlake movement home with Queen Anne influence. The home was listed on the National Register of Historic Places on December 18, 1979, under the Meridian Multiple Property Submission. It is also part of Merrehope Historic District, which was listed on the National Register on September 19, 1988. It is currently a private residence.

The "pink house", as it is known locally, prominently features pedimented gables, a front veranda with a corner, conical-roofed turret, and a conical roofed tower. The front porch features turned balusters with center beads and the multi-panel entrance door is headed by a stained glass transom.

The 5,000 sq ft (465 m^{2}), 16-room mansion sits on a 29,620.8 sq ft (0.68 acres) lot and takes up half of a city block. The Elson-Dudley house contains four bedrooms and two and a half bathrooms. The house holds ten fireplaces, five chimneys, a grand staircase, and sports an asymmetrical facade.
