= Frank Ellison =

Frank Cararas Ellison (March 14, 1887 – September 30, 1964) was an American model railroader who created the famous O scale Delta Lines model railroad in New Orleans, Louisiana and authored numerous articles from the 1930s to the 1950s. Mr. Ellison died after a brief illness, at midnight, at Our Lady of The Lake hospital in Baton Rouge.

Born in New Orleans, Ellison lived in that city for most of his life until his final years when he lived in Baton Rouge, Louisiana with a son. A biographical sketch in the July 1976 edition of Model Railroader magazine states:

Frank C. Ellison was over the years, a railroad telegrapher, vaudeville marimbaist, stage designer, storyteller, model railroader, model railroad author, and above all, a gentleman.

As "The Three Ellisons", Mr. Ellison, his late wife and his brother had a leading billing on the Orpheum circuit around the country for many years. The team was billed with such acts as Charlie Chaplin and Buster Keaton, and participated, by her invitation, Sarah Bernhart's program in her final appearance. Their classical music act was played on xylophone, built by Ellison and his father.

Between 1934 and 1956 Ellison became the face of model railroading in the United States when he wrote hundreds of articles on all aspects of the hobby, many involving his O scale layout that he built at his large house in the Lakeview district of New Orleans that he named the Delta Lines.

Although most of his writing was for hobby magazines, Ellison had also written articles for The Times-Picayune newspaper and its afternoon counterpart the States-Item. From the late 1940s to the early 1950s Ellison wrote a series of articles for Model Railroader magazine entitled "The Art of Model Railroading." These missives were later collected into a book entitled Frank Ellison on Model Railroading (Fawcett Books, Greenwich CT, 1954). Ellison had worked for many years in theatre and this experience influenced his ideas about model railroad design in which he claimed that the layout was a stage on which the trains were the actors. The work of transporting people and hauling freight was the drama that the model railroader reenacted whenever he ran his trains. Buildings, bridges, roads, hills and rivers, townscapes and factories were for him no more than a stage set for the trains, which he generally modelled to a much higher standard than these ancillary items.

Frank Ellison on Model Railroading starts with eight chapters on how railroads accomplished their work. The next four chapters deal with the construction of model railroad bench work and laying track, with the goal of making trains run reliably. The final four chapters deal with scenery and buildings: the lead chapter, "The Illusion of Distance," illustrates Ellison's philosophy perfectly; that model railroaders are creators of illusions, which, if done well, will entertain not only their creators but also their family, friends, and the public.

Ellison wrote that "the art of model railroading consists of condensing everything to within reasonable proportion", with no elements dominating over the others. He also held that all elements of a layout should contribute to its fundamental purpose, which is good train operation. He took his own photographs using flood lighting and a large format view camera. Careful examination of these photos reveals no evidence of a model signalling system on the Delta Lines, which would be consistent with his philosophy.

The Delta Lines at its maximum extent would accommodate from six to seventeen operators, all of whom were personal friends with no formal club organization. They met weekly on Saturdays, organized like the operating staff of a real railroad, and boasted attendance averaging 97 per cent. Like most O gauge systems of its era, the Delta Lines was hand-built of separate ties and rail and used outside third rail for power supply. Electric power was "flat" direct current provided by rechargeable batteries that had been scavenged from retired full size railroad passenger cars. The scenery was also hand-constructed, using methods that were common in museums and theatre stages: many structures painted on flats, instead of modeled, and artificial perspective where needed to create the illusion of distance. Operations used an accelerated clock to increase the apparent lengths of runs.

Ellison's wife died in 1954, after which he curtailed most of his writing. While the Delta Lines was arguably one of the greatest model railroads in its day, in 1956 this great layout was disassembled and put in storage as Ellison prepared to sell his house and move to Baton Rouge to be near his son. In 1959 the layout was sold to a new owner in Boston, Massachusetts, however, it was heavily damaged and largely destroyed when the truck that was transporting it was involved in a major accident during a heavy rainstorm. While the layout is no more, today many original pieces of the layout remain in the hands of private collectors.
