= Grumman G-44 Widgeon =

American seaplane

G-44 Widgeon
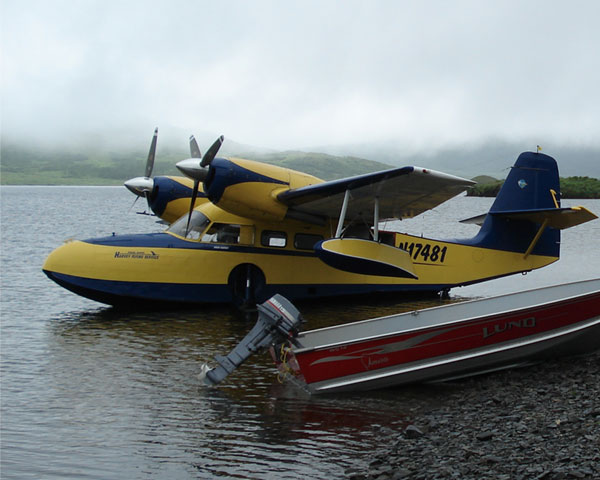
- A Grumman Widgeon on Frazer Lake on the southwest end of Kodiak Island, Alaska

General information
- Type: Amphibious transport
- Manufacturer: Grumman
- Primary users: United States Navy United States Army Air Forces; United States Coast Guard; Royal Navy
- Number built: 317 (including license-built French SCAN 30)

History
- First flight: 1940

The Grumman G-44 Widgeon is a five-person, twin-engined, amphibious aircraft. It was designated J4F by the United States Navy and Coast Guard and OA-14 by the United States Army Air Corps and United States Army Air Forces.

== Design and development ==
The Widgeon was originally designed for the civil market. It is smaller, but otherwise similar to Grumman's earlier G-21 Goose, and was produced from 1941 to 1955. The aircraft was used during World War II as a small patrol and utility machine by the US Navy, US Coast Guard, and Royal Navy's Fleet Air Arm.

The first prototype flew in 1940, and the first production aircraft went to the US Navy as an antisubmarine aircraft. In total, 276 were built by Grumman, including 176 for the military. During World War II, they served with the US Navy, Coast Guard, Civil Air Patrol, and Army Air Force, as well as with the British Royal Navy, which was given the service name Gosling by the Royal Air Force.

== Operational history ==
=== United States Coast Guard ===
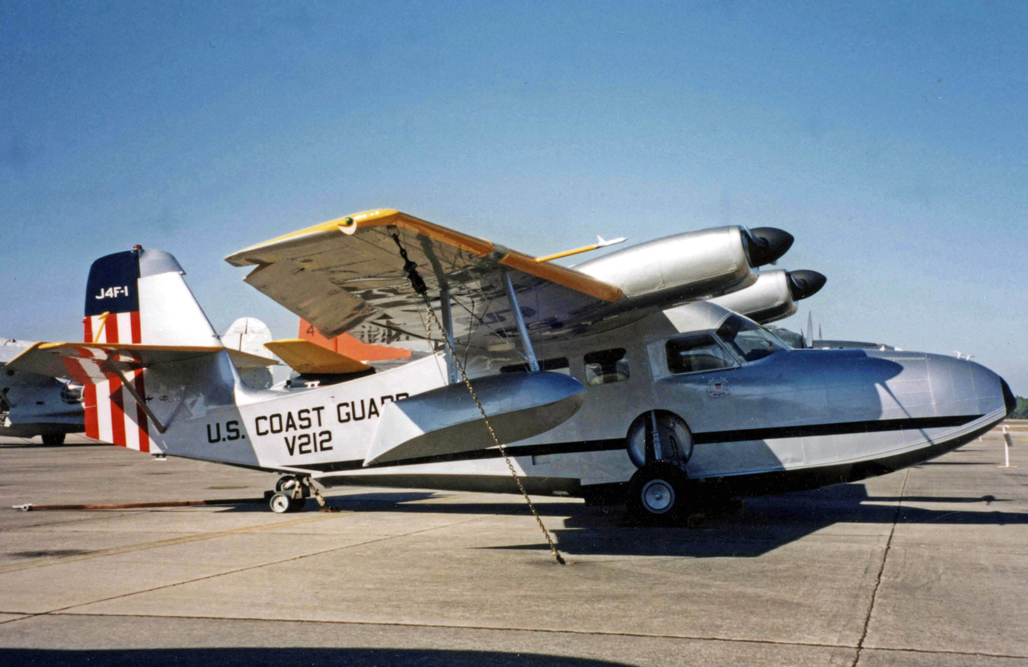
Grumman J4F-1 of the United States Coast Guard preserved at the National Museum of Naval Aviation at Pensacola, Florida in 2002

On August 1, 1942, a J4F-1 flown by US Coast Guard Patrol Squadron 212 based out of Houma, Louisiana, and flown by Chief Aviation Pilot Henry White, spotted and attacked a German U-boat off the coast of Louisiana. White reported the submarine sunk, and he was subsequently credited with sinking U-166 and awarded the Distinguished Flying Cross.

However, in June 2001 the wreck of U-166 was found sitting near the wreck of SS Robert E. Lee by an oil exploration team; and the sinking of U-166 on July 30 (i.e. two days before the Widgeon flight) is now credited to patrol craft PC-566 escorting the Robert E. Lee.

White's Widgeon is now thought to have made an unsuccessful attack against U-171, a Type IXC U-boat identical to U-166 that reported an air attack coincident with White's attack. U-171 was undamaged by White's attack, but was sunk four months later in the Bay of Biscay.

=== Civil Air Patrol ===
The sinking of a German U-boat by the Civil Air Patrol (CAP) was claimed by one of their larger aircraft on 11 July 1942. The Grumman G-44 Widgeon, armed with two depth charges and crewed by Captain Johnny Haggins and Major Wynant Farr, was scrambled when another CAP patrol radioed that they had encountered an enemy submarine, but were returning to base due to low fuel. After scanning the area, Farr spotted the U-boat cruising beneath the surface of the waves. Unable to accurately determine the depth of the vessel, Haggins and Ferr radioed the situation back to base and followed the enemy in hopes that it would rise to periscope depth. For three hours, the crew shadowed the submarine. Just as Haggins was about to return to base, the U-boat rose to periscope depth, and Haggins swung the aircraft around, aligned with the submarine and dove to 100 feet (30 m). Farr released one of the two depth charges, blowing the submarine's front out of the water. As it left an oil slick, Farr made a second pass and released the other charge. Debris appeared on the ocean's surface, confirming the U-boat's demise and the CAP's first kill.

=== Postwar operations ===
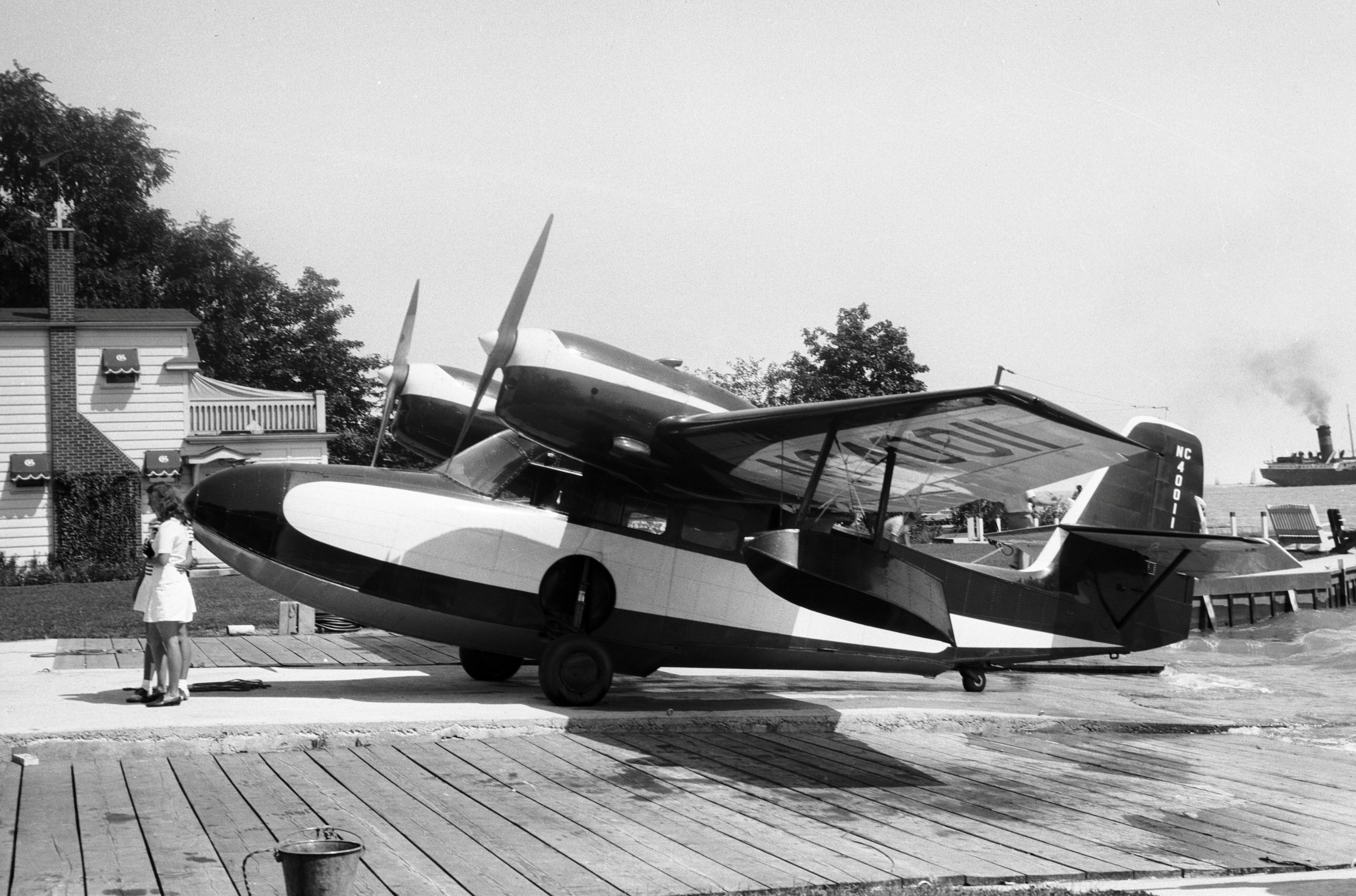
Grumman Widgeon at Garland's Seaplane Base on the Detroit River in 1947

After the war, Grumman redesigned the aircraft to make it more suitable for civilian operations. A new hull improved its water handling, and six seats were installed. In total, 76 of the new G-44As were built by Grumman, the last being delivered on January 13, 1949. Another 41 were produced under license by the Société de construction aéronavale (SCAN) in La Rochelle, France, as the SCAN 30. Most of these ended up in the United States.

McKinnon Enterprises at Sandy, Oregon, converted over 70 Widgeons to "Super Widgeons". The conversion features replacing the engines with 270 hp (200 kW) Avco Lycoming GO-480-B1D flat-six piston engines, and various other modifications, including modern avionics, three-bladed propellers, larger windows, improved soundproofing, emergency exits, and increased maximum takeoff weight. Retractable wingtip floats were optional.

== Variants ==
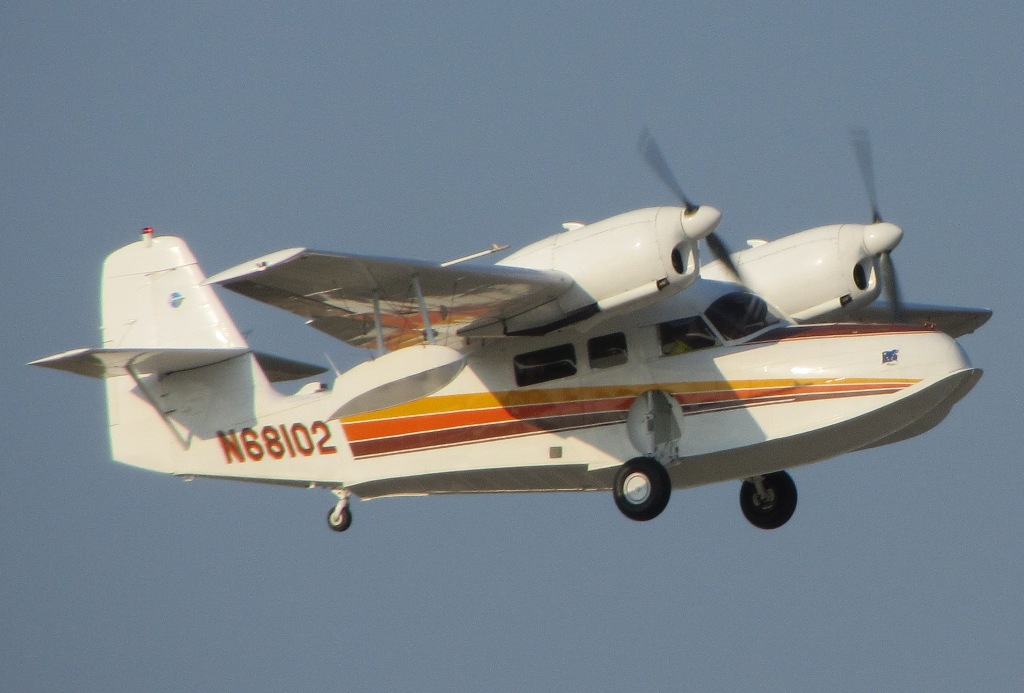
1945 G-44

G-44
Main production variant, 200 built (serial nos. 1201–1400) including J4F series military variants listed below.

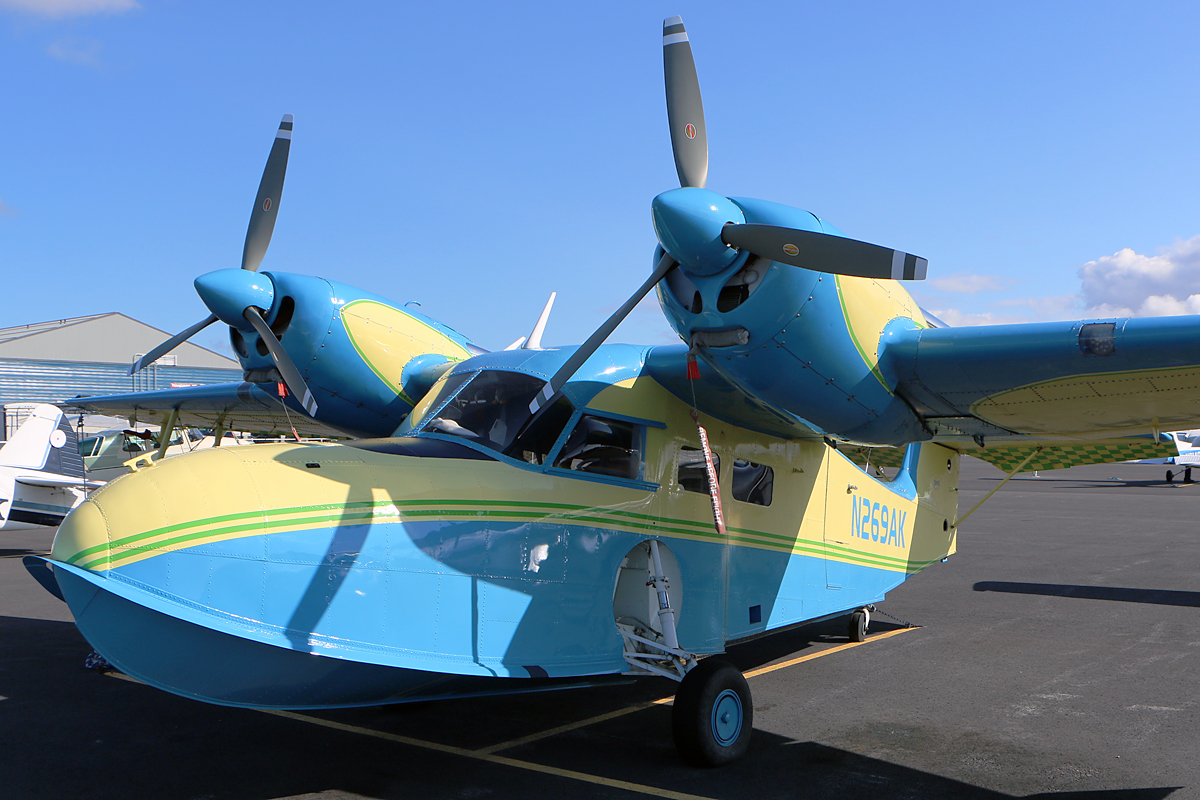
G-44A

G-44A
Improved postwar production variant with redesigned hull, 76 built (serial nos. 1401–1476.)
J4F-1
G-44 for the United States Coast Guard with three seats, 25 built.
J4F-2
United States Navy version of the J4F-1 with 5-seat interior, 131 built.

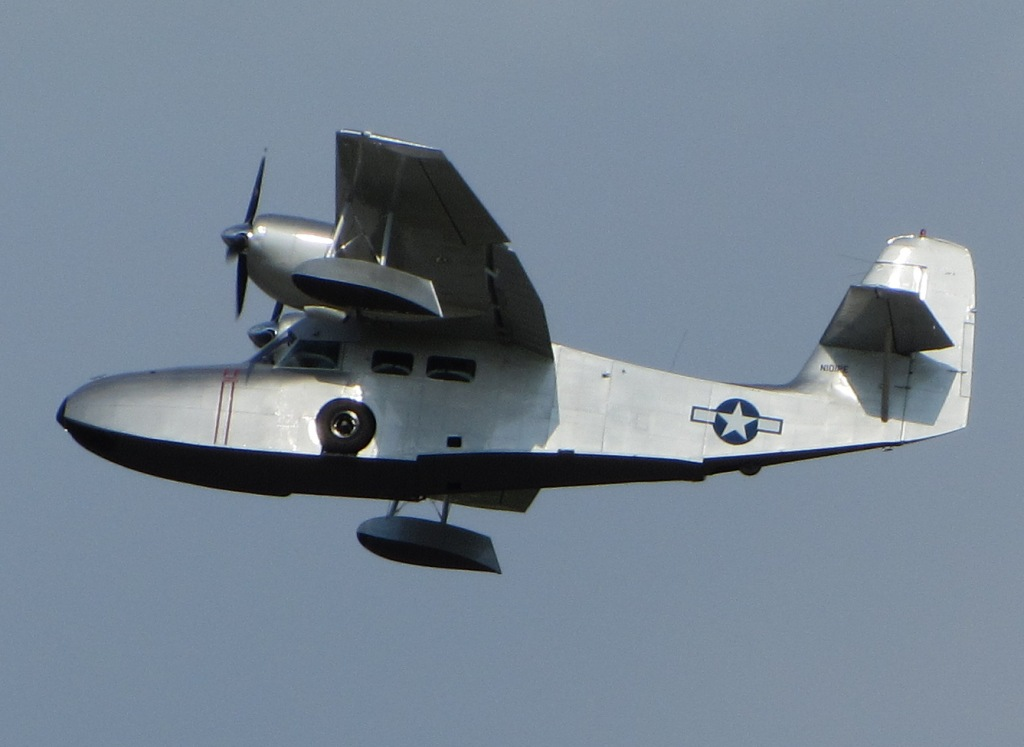
OA-14

OA-14
Fifteen G-44s impressed into wartime service with the United States Army Air Forces.
OA-14A
One new aircraft for the Corps of Engineers.
Gosling I
Fifteen J4F-2s transferred to the Royal Navy, later renamed Widgeon I
B.S.6
(Thai: บ.ส.๖) Royal Thai Armed Forces designation for the J4F.

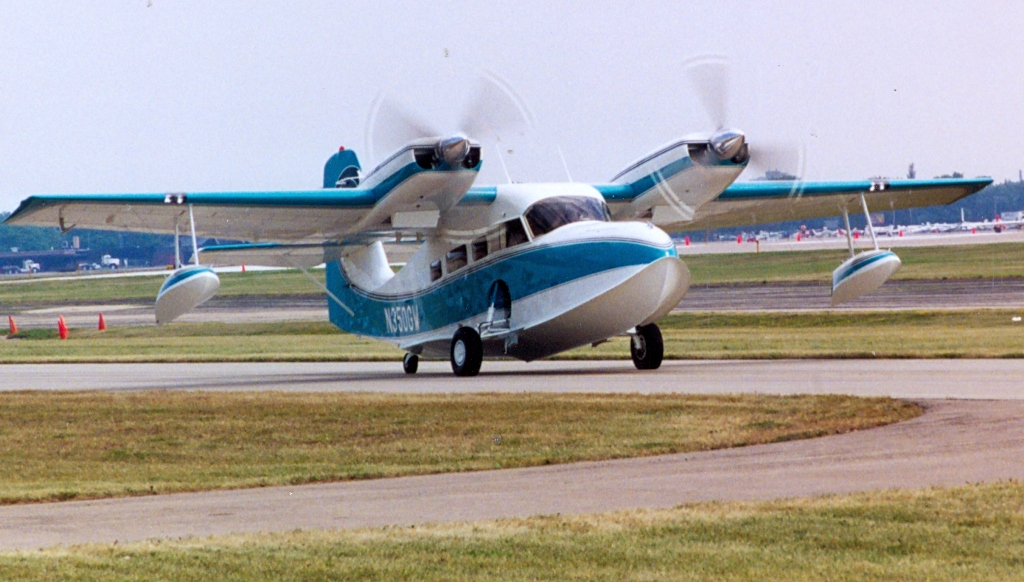
French-built SCAN Type 30

SCAN 30
G-44A Licence-built in France using metric standards and not anodized as were original Grumman-built aircraft, 41 built (serial nos. 1–41.)
PACE Gannet

Pacific Aerospace Engineering Corporation conversions of S.C.A.N. 30s, powered by 300 hp (220 kW) Lycoming R-680-13 radial engines. Later known as the Gannet Super Widgeon

== Operators ==
=== Military operators ===
Brazil
Brazilian Air Force operated 14 from 1942 to 1958
Cuba
Cuban Navy received four in 1952
Israel

- Israeli Air Force operated two from 1948 to 1949

Portugal
Portuguese Navy operated 12 from 1942 to 1968
Thailand
Royal Thai Navy operated five in 1951
Royal Thai Air Force operated five from 1951 to 1956
United Kingdom

- Royal Navy Fleet Air Arm

United States

- United States Army Air Corps
- United States Army Air Forces
- United States Coast Guard
- United States Navy
- Civil Air Patrol

Uruguay
Uruguayan Navy operated one example from 1943 to 1979

=== Civil operators ===
Norway

- Mørefly

New Zealand

- Mount Cook Airline

== Surviving aircraft ==
=== Brazil ===
- 1290 – UC-4F2 on static display at the Museu Aeroespacial in Rio de Janeiro.

=== Canada ===
- 28 – SCAN-30 airworthy with Mark Williston of Delta, British Columbia.

=== Portugal ===
- 120 – G-44 on static display at the Navy Museum in Lisbon.
- 129 – G-44 on static display at the Museu do Ar in Sintra, Lisbon.

=== New Zealand ===
- 1439 - G-44A - Registers in New Zealand as ZK-CFA operating from Bay of Islands Airport and on display at Kaitaia Airport.

=== Thailand ===
- 1449 – G-44A on static display at the Royal Thai Air Force Museum in Bangkok.

=== United States ===
- 31 – SCAN 30 airworthy with Orlando Financial Corporation in Bear, Delaware. It was used as De plane! De plane! in the television show Fantasy Island where it delivered guests to the island and was put up for sale at auction in April 2016.
- 1312 – G-44 on display at the Alaska Aviation Museum in Anchorage, Alaska.
- 32976 – J4F-2 on static display at the Pima Air & Space Museum in Tucson, Arizona.
- V212 – J4F-1 on static display at the National Naval Aviation Museum in Pensacola, Florida.

== Specifications (G-44) ==
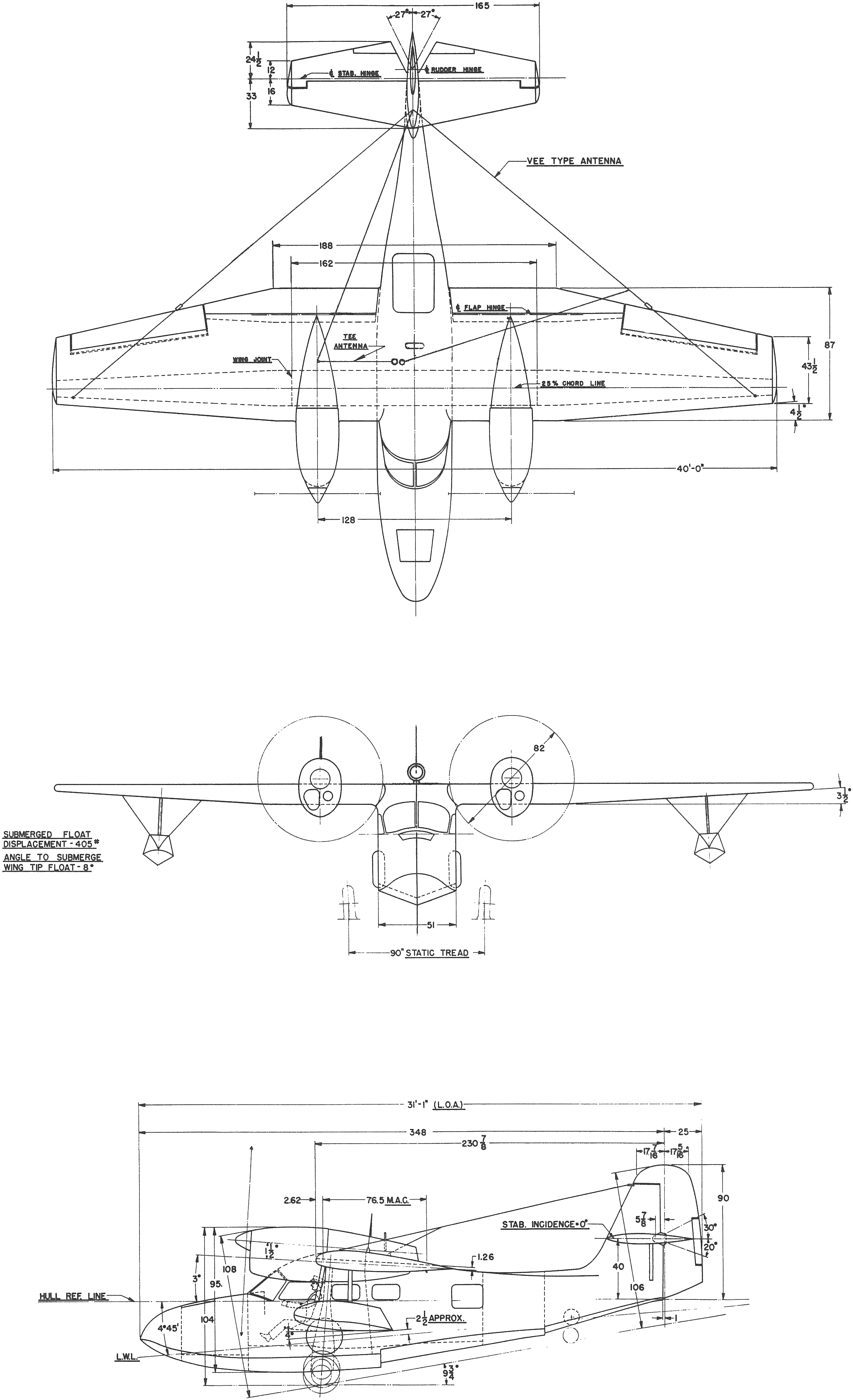
3-view line drawing of the Grumman J4F-1 Widgeon

Data from War Planes of the Second World War: Volume Five: Flying Boats

General characteristics

- Crew: 1
- Capacity: 4 passengers (as utility aircraft)
- Length: 31 ft 1 in (9.47 m)
- Wingspan: 40 ft 0 in (12.19 m)
- Height: 11 ft 5 in (3.48 m)
- Wing area: 245 sq ft (22.8 m^{2})
- Empty weight: 3,240 lb (1,470 kg)
- Gross weight: 4,525 lb (2,053 kg)
- Powerplant: 2 × Ranger L-440-5 air-cooled inverted six-cylinder inline engine, 200 hp (150 kW) each

Performance

- Maximum speed: 153 mph (246 km/h, 133 kn)
- Cruise speed: 138 mph (222 km/h, 120 kn)
- Range: 920 mi (1,480 km, 800 nmi)
- Service ceiling: 14,600 ft (4,500 m)
- Rate of climb: 700 ft/min (3.6 m/s)

Armament

- Bombs: 1 × 200 lb (90 kg) depth charge in anti-submarine role

== See also ==
Related development

- Grumman G-21 Goose

Aircraft of comparable role, configuration, and era

- Weserflug We 271
- Piaggio P.136
- Ellison-Mahon Gweduck

Related lists

- List of aircraft of World War II
- List of flying boats and floatplanes
