= Ellison-Mahon Gweduck =

Amphibious aircraft

Gweduck
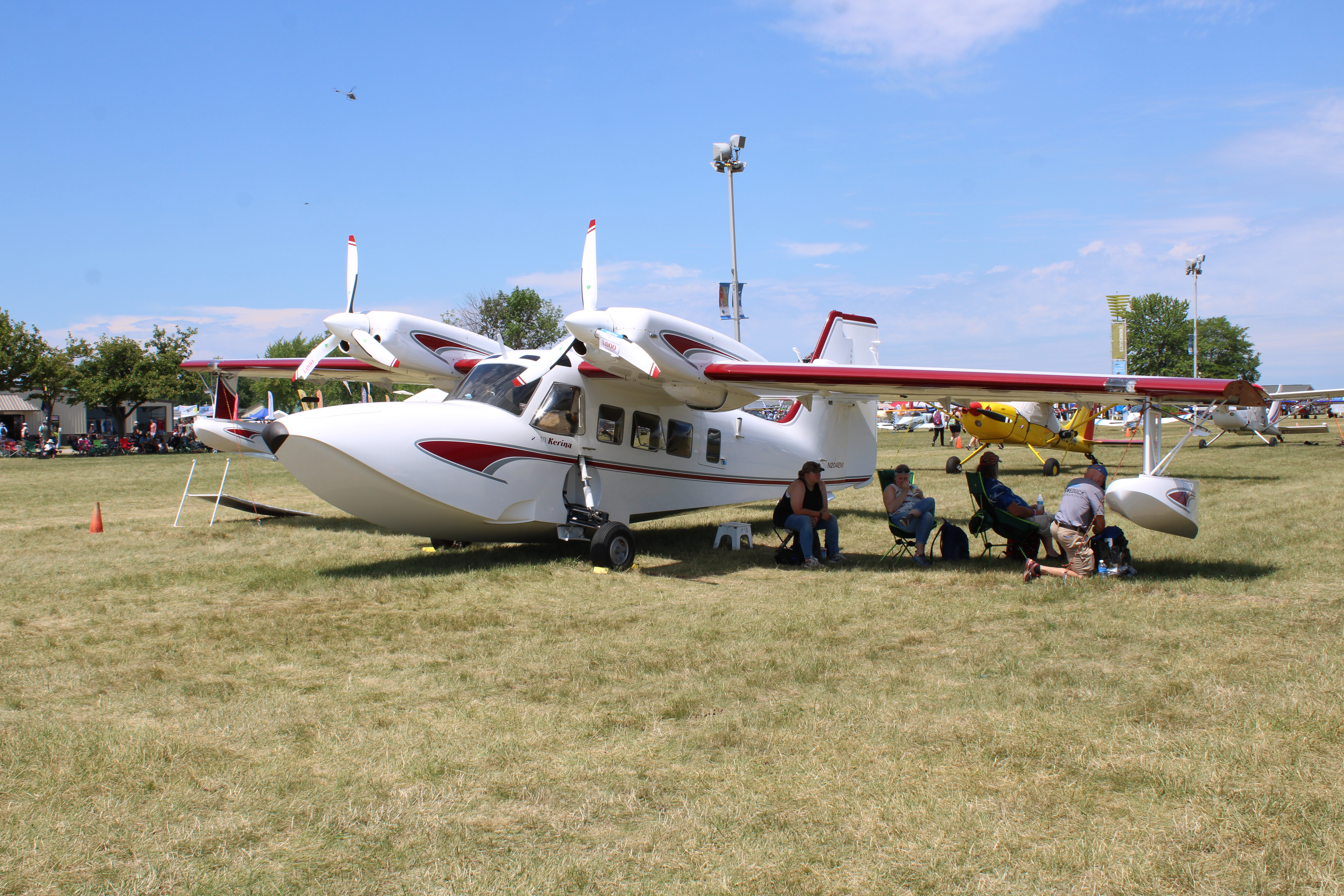

General information
- Type: 4-passenger amphibious aircraft
- National origin: United States
- Manufacturer: Ellison-Mahon Aircraft
- Designer: Ben Ellison, Bryan Mahon
- Number built: 1

History
- First flight: 2 May 2009

The Ellison-Mahon Gweduck or Geoduck is an American twin-engine amphibious aircraft, built from composites to resemble the Grumman Widgeon.

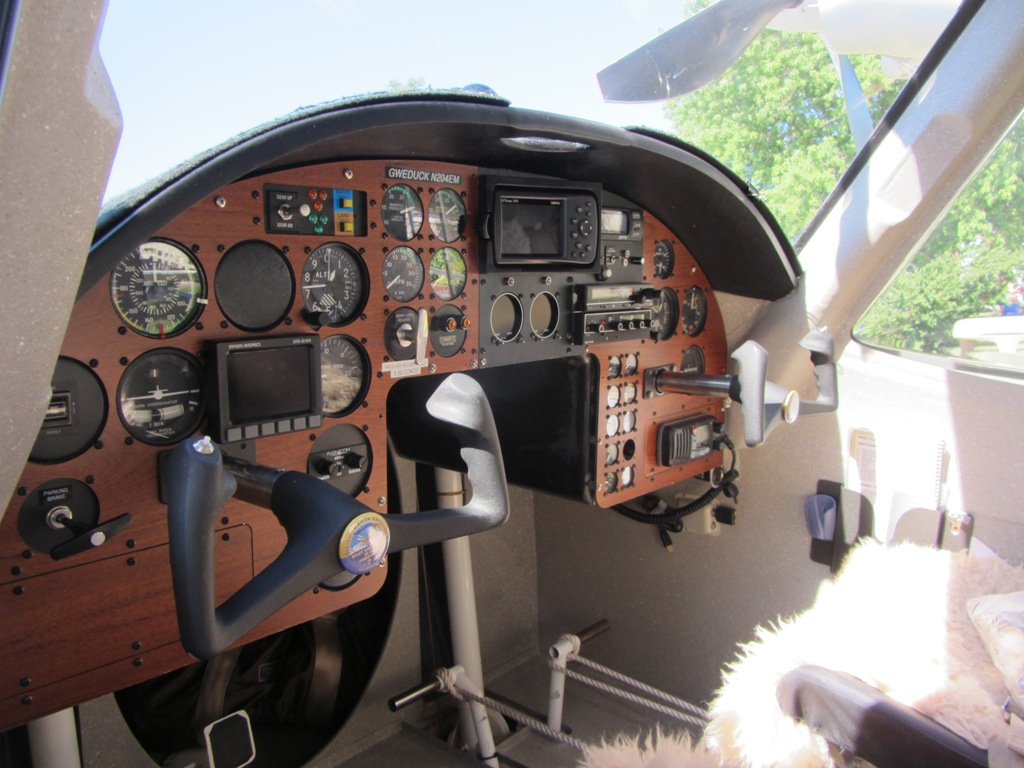
Gweduck instrument panel

== Design and development ==
The Gweduck is a re-engined "re-creation" in modern composite materials of the early 1940s Grumman G-44 Widgeon. The name can also be written Geoduck and is not named for a bird, but a large clam. Although it is broadly similar to the Widgeon and follows its cantilever high-wing monoplane, twin engined, cruciform tail and tailwheel undercarriage layout, it has more powerful engines, retractable floats, more cabin windows and is larger all around.

The Gweduck's structure is formed from glass and carbon fibre. Its high wings are trapezoidal in plan, fitted with externally balanced ailerons and Fowler flaps. Each wing has a float mounted below it on a single, wide chord strut which rotates through 90° after take-off to place the float at the wing tip. A pair of 300 hp (220 kW) Lycoming IO-540 six cylinder horizontally opposed engines are mounted forward of the wing leading edge with their thrust lines above the upper surface. The Gweduck has a single step hull, with the pilots' cabin just forward of the wing leading edge; behind them, the passenger cabin has four windows on each side. Tail surfaces are straight edged, the tailplane trapezoidal and the fin leading edge swept, with a horn balanced rudder and externally mass balanced elevators. On land the Gweduck uses a conventional undercarriage, with mainwheels that retract but remain exposed in the fuselage sides and a tailwheel that retracts behind doors in the extreme rear fuselage.

The first flight was on 2 May 2009 from Lake Washington. By June 2010, 200 flying hours had been logged.

== Operational history ==
By April 2017, one example, the prototype, had been registered in the United States with the Federal Aviation Administration.

== Specifications ==
Data from Jane's All the World's Aircraft 2010/12

General characteristics

- Crew: Two pilots
- Capacity: 4 passengers
- Length: 34 ft 5 in (10.49 m)
- Wingspan: 48 ft 0 in (14.63 m) floats down
- Height: 10 ft 6 in (3.20 m) propellers "Y"
- Wing area: 295.0 sq ft (27.41 m^{2})
- Aspect ratio: 7.8
- Airfoil: GA35U-A315
- Empty weight: 4,200 lb (1,905 kg) prototype
- Max takeoff weight: 5,999 lb (2,721 kg)
- Fuel capacity: 167 Imp gal (200 US gal; 758 L)
- Powerplant: 2 × Lycoming IO-540-M1B5 flat-six piston, 300 hp (220 kW) each
- Propellers: 3-bladed MT-propeller MTV-9-B-C-F-R(M)/CFR213-59

Performance

- Cruise speed: 160 mph (250 km/h, 130 kn) at 65% power at 915 m (3000 ft)
- Wing loading: 20.3 lb/sq ft (99.3 kg/m^{2}) maximum
- Power/mass: 164 W/kg (0.10 hp/lb)
