= Ellyson =

Ellyson may refer to:

- Edgar Ellyson (1869–1954), minister
- Henry Keeling Ellyson (1923–1890), Virginia newspaperman, father of James Taylor Ellyson, grandfather of Theodore Gordon Ellyson.
- James Taylor Ellyson (1847–1919), politician
- Robert Ellyson (1615–1671), sheriff
- Theodore Gordon Ellyson (1885–1928), naval officer

== See also ==
- Ellison
- USS Ellyson (DD-454)
