= Ellison Greenslade =

Bahamian police officer (born 1961)

Ellison Edroy Greenslade Dr.h.c, MBA, QPM
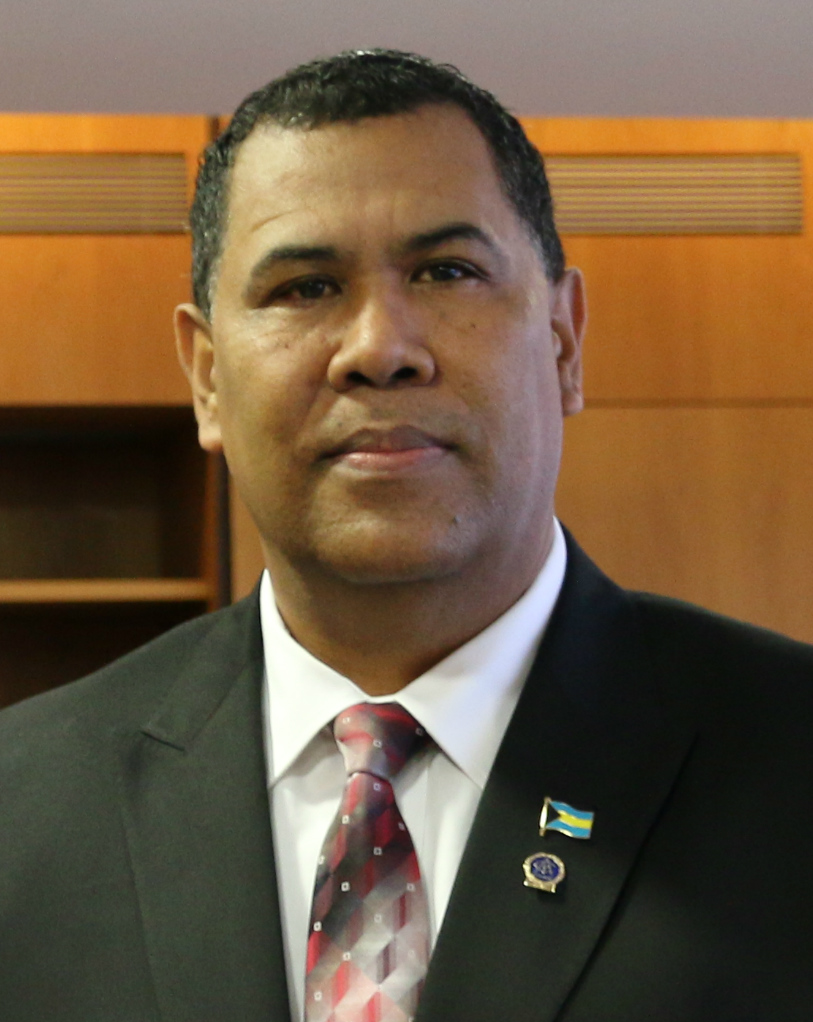
- Ellison Greenslade in 2019
- Born: 24 May 1961 (age 64); New Providence, Bahamas
- Occupation: High Commissioner
- Spouse: Kim Greenslade
- Awards: Queen's Police Medal; Prime Minister's Above and Beyond award Medal for Gallantry; Medal for Meritorious Service; Medal for Long Service & Good Conduct
- Website: www.bahamashclondon.net/high-commissioner/

Ellison Edroy Greenslade QPM (born 24 May 1961) is a Bahamian retired police officer who was Commissioner of Police of the Royal Bahamas Police Force (2010 - 2017), and then became the Bahamas High Commissioner to the Court of St. James's (United Kingdom).

== Education ==
Greenslade was born in New Providence on 24 May 1961 and attended schools in Cedar Harbor, Abaco; Lovely Bay, Acklins; Kemp's Bay, Andros; Knowles, Cat Island; and Stephen Dillet, Nassau. He graduated from S.C. McPherson Junior High and the Government High School, both in Nassau, New Providence. Upon graduation from the Police Training College, he continued studies on a part-time basis. He subsequently obtained an associate degree in Business Administration from the University of the Bahamas. He holds a postgraduate degree in police management and law enforcement from the University of Leicester in the United Kingdom. He also holds an MBA from the University of Miami, 1997.

== Career ==
Greenslade joined the Senior Executive Leadership Team (SELT) of the Royal Bahamas Police Force in July 2000, when he was appointed Assistant Commissioner of policing services on Grand Bahama which required him to be transferred to Freeport, Grand Bahama. He served in Freeport for seven years, making him the longest serving Northern Bahamas district commander. Greenslade returned to Nassau once he was appointed to the rank of Senior Assistant Commissioner of Police.

== Honours ==
Greenslade was awarded the Queen's Police Medal for services to policing and the community.

== See also ==
- Royal Bahamas Police Force
