= Ken Price (footballer, born 1939) =

English footballer

Personal information
- Full name: Kenneth Edward Price
- Date of birth: 25 March 1939
- Place of birth: Ellesmere Port, England
- Date of death: May 2014 (aged 75)
- Place of death: Peterborough, England
- Position: Centre forward

Youth career
- West Bromborough
- 1959–1960: Aston Villa

Senior career*
Years	Team	Apps	(Gls)
1960–1961	Tranmere Rovers	3	(2)
1961–1962	Hartlepools United	8	(3)
- Spalding United
Total		11	(5)
- * Club domestic league appearances and goals

Kenneth Edward Price (25 March 1939 – May 2014) was an English footballer who played as a centre forward in the Football League for Tranmere Rovers and Hartlepools United.
