= American Beethoven Society =

- Type: International organization
- Purpose: Promotion of Beethoven's music
- Location: Worldwide
- Method: Curating Beethoven materials, publishing the Beethoven Journal
- Affiliations: Ira F. Brilliant Center for Beethoven Studies
- Website: American Beethoven Society Official Website

The American Beethoven Society is an international organization that celebrates the music of Ludwig van Beethoven.

The Society's primary work is the creation and support of a comprehensive collection of Beethoven materials at the Ira F. Brilliant Center for Beethoven Studies, which is housed at the San Jose State University, San Jose, California. It was the first center built in the western hemisphere that was dedicated to Beethoven. The collection contains over 31,000 items, including first and early editions of Beethoven's musical scores, some original Beethoven manuscripts, Beethoven-related books, sculpture and artwork, sound and visual media, and Beethoven relia.

Ira F. Brilliant was a lifelong lover of Beethoven's music and started collecting early manuscripts and first editions in 1970. He wanted the materials to be available to students and scholars. He started to collaborate with the College of Humanities and the Arts at San Jose State University.

The Society also co-publishes the semi-annual Beethoven Newsletter, in addition to the Beethoven Journal, which is now in an online format only and freely available to all. The Society also sponsors the annual New Beethoven Research Conference under the auspices of the American Musicological Society and supports a research award for early-career scholars.
