= Ken Price (weightlifter) =

British weightlifter

Personal information
- Nationality: British
- Born: 6 January 1941
- Died: June 1999 (aged 58)

Sport
- Sport: Weightlifting

Ken Price (6 January 1941 – June 1999) was a British weightlifter. He competed at the 1972 Summer Olympics and the 1976 Summer Olympics.
