= Ellison Hoover =

American printmaker and illustrator

- Born: Ellison Bernard Hoover; August 10, 1888; Cleveland, Ohio, United States
- Died: March 17, 1955 (aged 66); New York, New York, United States
- Education: Cleveland School of Art; Art Students League
- Known for: Printmaker; Illustrator; Painter
- Movement: Social realism American realism

Ellison Bernard Hoover (1888–1955) was an American painter, lithographer and cartoonist. He is most notable as an artist for his atmospheric prints of scenes in New York, Paris and elsewhere, "beautiful black and white representations of rural and urban landscapes complemented by faint, ghostly details, leaving much of the viewer’s imagination to wander and fill in ambiguous spaces".

== Personal life and education ==
Hoover was born in Cleveland, Ohio, to Orlando B. Hoover (1854–1919) and Flora M. Ellison (1857–1926). He studied at the Cleveland School of Art and the Art Students League of New York with Frederick Gottwald and George Bridgman, from whom he learned anatomy, including the drawing of faces.

On November 23, 1926, he married Dorothy Chandler (1898–1954), picture editor of Life Magazine.

== Career ==
Hoover was a syndicated cartoonist for the New York World after studies at the Cleveland School of Art. He also worked for the Newark Evening News and the New York Herald-Tribune, and was a contributor to The New Yorker and the Brooklyn Eagle.

Hoover created political cartoons for Life and Judge magazines in the 1910s and 20s.; "his fat little German-Americans attracted some attention amid the fervid anti-German hysteria preceding and during World War I". His “Cartoons from Life” (Simon and Schuster, 1925) was praised in its foreword by Robert Benchley "for standing pat with the tenets of satire at its most realistic … [he] does not represent war by a figure of Mars. He draws life-like portraits of the men who are responsible for war."

In 1925, Hoover provided illustrations for "Barber shop ballads: a book of close harmony", edited by Sigmund Spaeth

As early as 1928, Hoover created the full-page syndicated comic “The Outline of Oscar”. In 1930 he took over drawing the daily syndicated comic strip “Mr. and Mrs.” after the death of its creator, cartoonist Clare Briggs. The texts were provided by Art Folwell. Together they created the strip until 1947.

Hoover was successful as a fine artist—in painting, drawings and lithography. A friend, Alexander Hammerslough, describes a one-man gallery show in Martha’s Vineyard "which consisted of his head drawings of many celebrities, including James Cagney." His prints are well known. Multiple copies have survived and can be found in museums, galleries, and at auction. His paintings and drawings are scarce, at least to the public.

The art critic Thomas Craven provided a typed assessment of Hoover's work for art dealer Jean Bohne:

Ellisonn [sic] Hoover has long been recognized as one of the most completely equipped craftsmen in the field of lithography. He uses the medium as a precision instrument, designing his plates with an instinctive sense of placement and executing them with a certainty of touch and delicacy of tone that are remarkable. To his works in black and white he has recently added a new form of color lithography -- a print invested with color by a method of his own invention. Instead of merely tinting the black-and-white impression with surface embellishments, he has incorporated the color with the texture and substance of the drawing, sometimes in subdued tones, and again in a range of high intensity. In consequence, each print becomes not just an impression, but a unique work of art, beautiful in style, subject and execution, and standing out as an original production in its own right.

== Exhibitions ==
From Falk, Peter, "Who Was Who in American Art", 1953 except as noted:

- Mint Museum of Art, 1945, 1946
- National Academy of Design, 1944, 1946
- Buck Hill Art Association, Buck Hill Falls, PA, 1945
- Wash. Whatcom Community College [?], 1931, 1944
- Northwest Printmakers, 1944
- Society of American Etchers; Grand Central Gallery, 1945 (one-man show)
- Library of Congress, 1946 (prize)
- Laguna Beacharts Alliance, 1946 (prize)
- Ferargil Galleries, New York, 1949, 1950 (exhibition catalogs, Ferargil Galleries)
- Wellons Galleries, New York, 1952 (exhibition catalog, Wellons Galleries)

== Works ==
Representatives of Hoover's work can be found at

- Amon Carter Museum of American Art
- Fine Arts Museums of San Francisco
- National Gallery of Art
- Smithsonian American Art Museum

== Archives ==
Artist’s files for Hoover can be found at

- Frick Art Reference Library of The Frick Collection
