= E. A. Smyth =

E. A. Smyth may refer to:

- E. A. Smyth (industrialist) (1847–1942)
- E. A. Smyth (entomologist) (1863–1941)
