= Ellison Elementary School =

Ellison Elementary School may refer to:

- Ellison Elementary School in School District 22 Vernon in British Columbia
- Ellison Elementary School in School District 23 Central Okanagan in Kelowna, British Columbia
