= USS Harold J. Ellison (DD-864) =

Gearing-class destroyer

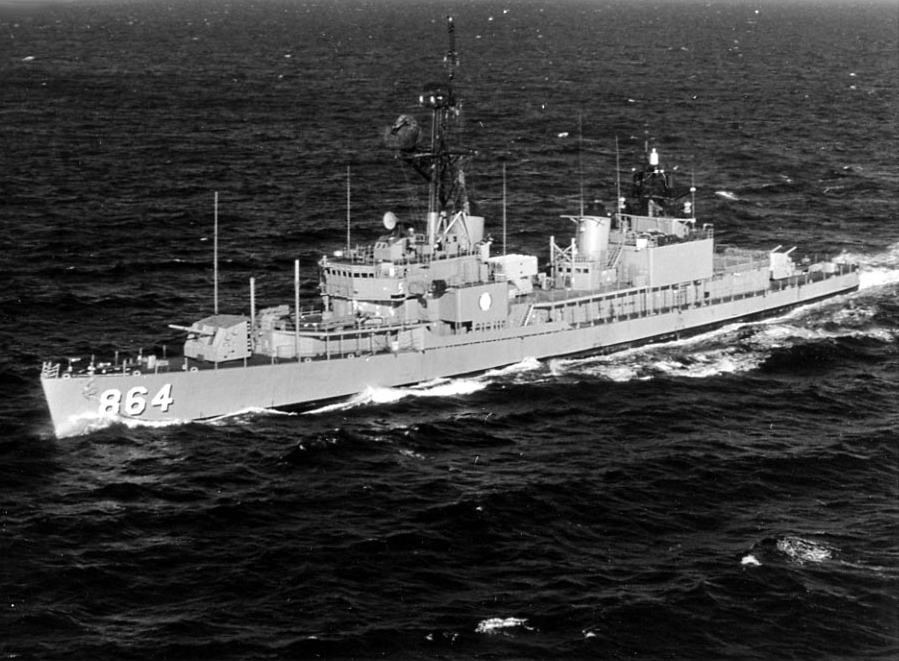
- USS Harold J. Ellison underway in August 1976

History

United States
- Name: USS Harold J. Ellison
- Namesake: Ensign Harold John Ellison (1917–1942)
- Builder: Bethlehem Mariners Harbor, Staten Island
- Laid down: 3 October 1944
- Launched: 14 March 1945
- Commissioned: 23 June 1945
- Decommissioned: 1 October 1983
- Stricken: 1 October 1983
- Identification: Callsign: NBGB; Hull number: DD-864
- Fate: Transferred to Pakistan, 1 October 1983

Pakistan
- Name: PNS Shah Jahan
- Namesake: Shah Jahan
- Acquired: 1 October 1983
- In service: 1983–1993
- Home port: Naval Base Karachi
- Fate: Sunk as target by Pakistan Navy 1994

General characteristics
- Class & type: Gearing-class destroyer
- Displacement: 2,425 long tons (2,464 t) light; 3,460 long tons (3,516 t) full
- Length: 390 ft 6 in (119.02 m)
- Beam: 41 ft 1 in (12.52 m)
- Draft: 18 ft 6 in (5.64 m)
- Propulsion: Geared turbines, 2 shafts, 60,000 shp (45 MW)
- Speed: 34 knots (63 km/h; 39 mph)
- Range: 6,500 nmi (12,000 km) at 15 kn (28 km/h; 17 mph)
- Complement: 367
- Armament: 6 × 5"/38 caliber guns; 12 × 40 mm AA guns; 11 × 20 mm AA guns; 10 × 21 inch (533 mm) torpedo tubes; 6 × depth charge projectors; 2 × depth charge tracks

USS Harold J. Ellison (DD-864) was a Gearing-class destroyer in service with the United States Navy from 1945 to 1983. She was then transferred to Pakistan and renamed Shah Jahan (D-164). The ship was finally sunk as a target in 1994.

== Namesake ==
Harold John Ellison (17 January 1917 – 4 June 1942) was born in Buffalo, New York. He was appointed Ensign 20 October 1941 after completing flight training. Soon afterwards he reported to Torpedo Squadron 8 on board the aircraft carrier USS Hornet.

In the pivotal Battle of Midway on 4 June 1942 Ellison, piloting a Douglas TBD Devastator torpedo bomber, and his comrades led a torpedo attack on the Japanese carriers, pressing home the attack without fighter cover. Though no hits were scored and all of the squadron's aircraft were shot down, the attack had disrupted the Japanese formation, delaying their preparations for a second strike. Subsequent attacks by Torpedo Squadron 6 and Torpedo Squadron 3 continued this disruption, as well as occupying the Japanese combat air patrol while U.S. Navy dive bombers slipped in virtually unnoticed. These subsequently attacked the Japanese aircraft carriers with great success, so that, barely an hour after Torpedo 8's sacrifice, three Japanese carriers were in flames. Ensign Ellison was classified as "presumed dead" on 5 June 1942 and posthumously awarded the Navy Cross posthumously for his gallantry at Midway.

The U.S. Navy destroyer escort USS Harold J. Ellison was named in his honor, but was cancelled in 1944 while under construction.

== History ==
=== 1945–1983 ===
Harold J. Ellison was laid down by the Bethlehem Steel Corporation at Staten Island, New York on 3 October 1944, launched on 14 March 1945 by Mrs. Audrey Ellison, the widow of Ensign Ellison and commissioned on 23 June 1945.

Although scheduled to join the Pacific Fleet for the final assault on Japan, Harold J. Ellison was completing her shakedown cruise when the surrender came on 15 August 1945. Homeported at Naval Station Norfolk, she operated in the Atlantic Ocean and Caribbean Sea for the next two years, taking part in United States Navy Reserve training cruises, and anti-submarine warfare exercises.

Beginning in 1947, when she sailed from Norfolk on 10 November, Harold J. Ellison added periodic cruises to the Mediterranean Sea with the 6th Fleet to her operations, helping to keep the peace and protect American interests in this area. She participated in the search for lost British submarine HMS Affray in April 1951, and added cruises to the Caribbean and northern Europe in 1953.

From 1954 to 1956 she continued tactical training along the United States East Coast and participated in European cruises. Following the 1956 Suez Crisis, Harold J. Ellison, took part in peacekeeping operations in the Eastern Mediterranean during 1957.

The following summer, the Lebanon crisis occurred as the government of Lebanon experienced a division between pro-Western and pro-Arab sides. The destroyer screened aircraft carrier Saratoga (CV-60) and heavy cruiser Des Moines (CA-134) from July to September 1958 while the 6th Fleet landed United States Marines at the request of Lebanese President Camille Chamoun.

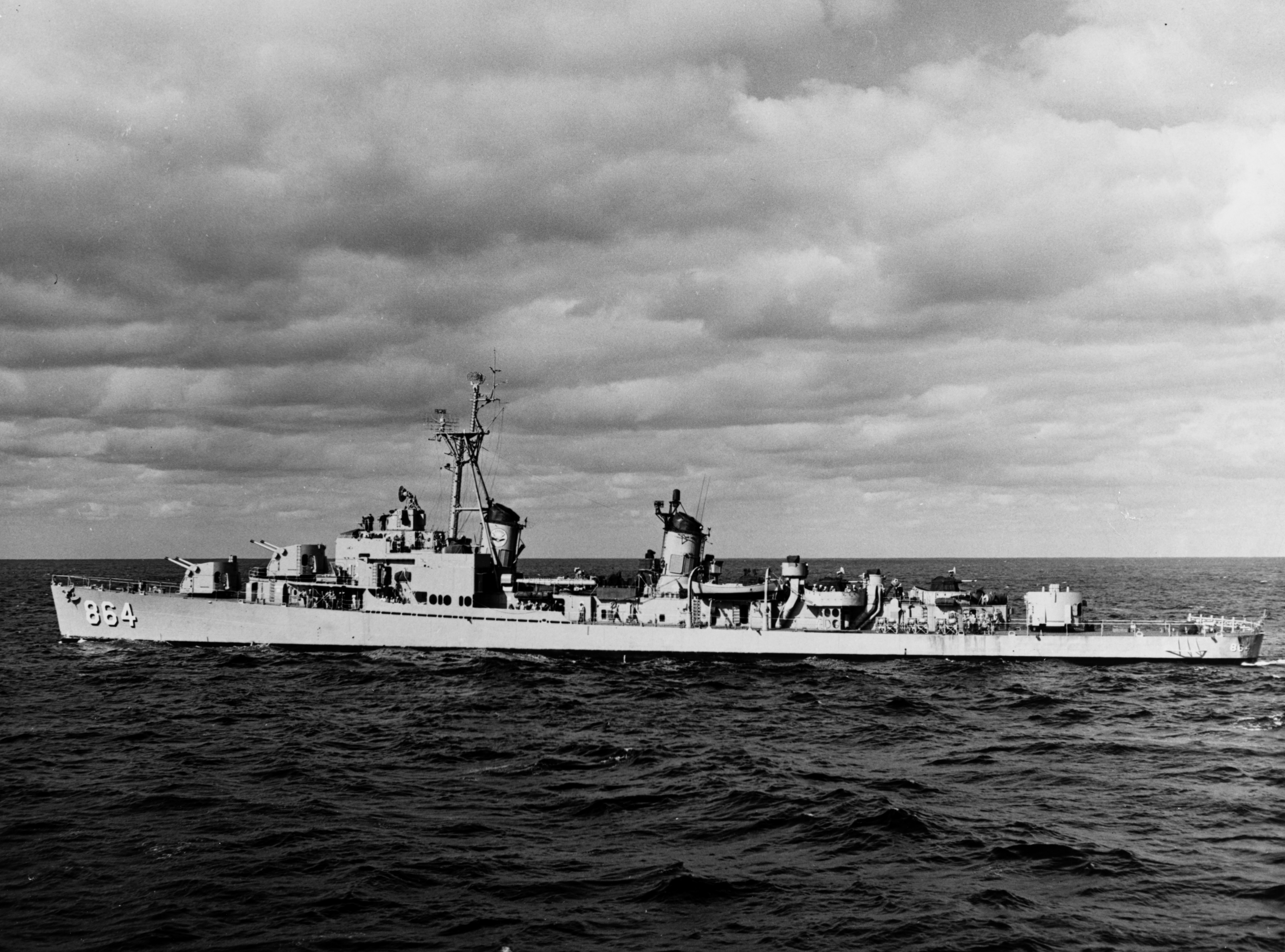
Harold J. Ellison underway in May 1958.

In September 1958, she operated with "Task Group Alfa" for the training of new tactics and equipment in antisubmarine warfare. Harold J. Ellison remained on this duty until April 1959.

The ship returned to her pattern of cruises to the Mediterranean in 1959, departing Norfolk on 21 September. In 1960, her homeport became Charleston, South Carolina, and in 1961, during her tenth deployment to the 6th Fleet, the ship cruised in the Persian Gulf during the crisis in Kuwait. Harold J. Ellison added a new function in January 1962, when she was assigned to Project Mercury as a part of the recovery unit in the Atlantic Ocean. In 1962, she underwent an extensive Fleet Rehabilitation and Modernization (FRAM I) overhaul at the Brooklyn Naval Shipyard. The destroyer rejoined the fleet in early 1963 and through 1964 continued to operate on training and readiness exercises off the Atlantic coast.

On 29 September 1965, Harold J. Ellison departed Norfolk with Destroyer Squadron (DesRon) 24 and headed via the Panama Canal for the Pacific Ocean. She served as plane guard for aircraft carriers on "Yankee Station" in the Tonkin Gulf, participated in "Sea Dragon" operations, patrolled on search and rescue duties and carried out naval gunfire support missions during the Vietnam War. Leaving Southeast Asia by steaming eastward through the Suez Canal, she completed her round-the-world cruise upon returning to Norfolk in April 1966. In July she entered the Norfolk Naval Shipyard for an overhaul which lasted for the rest of the year. After sea trials and refresher training early in 1967, Harold J. Ellison rejoined the United States Atlantic Fleet. She visited Brazil and crossed the equator on her way around Africa en route to the Middle East. During a port visit in Ethiopia, Emperor Haile Selassie was a guest aboard the ship. Harold J. Ellison also visited Kenya, Mauritius, Mozambique and Pakistan and returned in March 1971.

In July 1971, Harold J. Ellison was assigned to DesRon 36 and operated mainly in the Atlantic Ocean. On 1 July 1972, the destroyer was assigned to the DesRon 34 of the Navy Reserve. During the first half of 1973, she underwent an overhaul at Portsmouth, Virginia. Following her yard period, she sailed the Caribbean Sea, visiting Port-au-Prince, San Juan, Puerto Rico and Bermuda.

On 19 July 1974, Harold J. Ellison departed Norfolk for the Mediterranean Sea with the aircraft carrier USS Independence. The destroyer was transferred to DesRon 30 on 30 November 1974 and her homeport was changed to Philadelphia, Pennsylvania. For her remaining career in the U.S. Navy, she continued to train reservists on cruises along the U.S. East Coast or to the Caribbean Sea. Harold J. Ellison was decommissioned on 1 October 1983. Together with USS William C. Lawe, which was decommissioned on the same day, she was the last Gearing-class destroyer in the United States Navy.

=== Transfer to Pakistan ===
Harold J. Ellison was stricken from the Naval Vessel Register on 1 October 1983, transferred to Pakistan and renamed Shah Jahan (D-164). In 1994, she was cannibalized for parts and sunk as a target vessel by a PAF Dassault Mirage-5 of the Haiders with an Exocet Anti-Ship missile during Exercise Nasim-ul-Bahr.
