= Christine Ryan =

British teacher and public servant

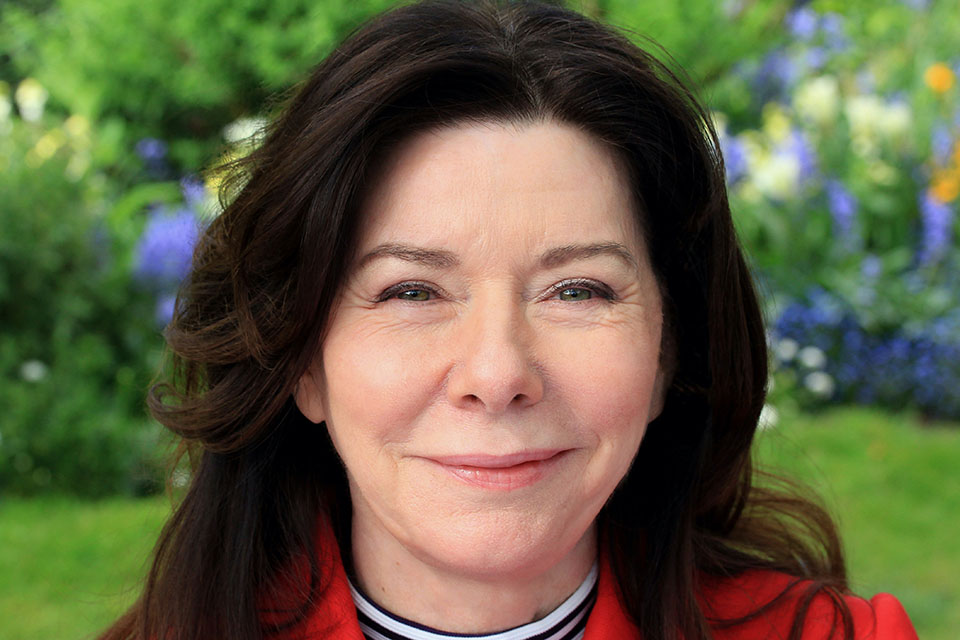
Dame Christine Ryan

Dame Christine Ryan, DBE, FRSB is a British teacher and public servant. Ryan worked as a teacher, and then as a school inspector. She was Chief Inspector of the Independent Schools Inspectorate for twelve years. From August 2020 to 2025, she was Chair of the Office for Standards in Education, Children's Services and Skills (Ofsted). Ryan is a co-founder of an education consultancy, Ryan and Grunsell.

== Life ==
Christine Ryan is a British teacher and public servant. Ryan worked as a teacher between 1976 and 1993, and she was then an Ofsted inspector from 1993 to 2009, and Chief Inspector and CEO of the Independent Schools Inspectorate from 2005 to 2017. Since August 2020, she has been Chair of the Office for Standards in Education, Children's Services and Skills (Ofsted), replacing Julius Weinberg. During her tenure, Ofsted transitioned to a new Chief Inspector, endured the demands of the COVID-19 pandemic, and undertook the largest public consultation in its history, called the Big Listen. In March 2024 Ryan had warned that Ofsted activities had broadened in recent years, but the organisation's funding had fallen, putting the reliability of future inspections at risk. Ryan also oversaw a review of the board and governance of Ofsted.

It was announced in 2024 that she would step down from Ofsted in 2025, to be replaced by interim director Sir Hamid Patel. Ryan's resignation occurred several months after the release of a 'damning report' of Ofsted from Dame Christine Gilbert, initiated after the death of head teacher Ruth Perry.

Ryan is a co-founder of an education consultancy, Ryan and Grunsell. She also chairs an education charity, TalentEd.
