= Wood-Dene School =

Coordinates: 52.9208°N 1.2273°E

- Cromer, Norfolk, NR11 8QA; England

Information
- Type: Independent
- Religious affiliation: Church of England
- Established: 1985
- Founder: Diana Taylor
- Closed: 2010
- Department for Education URN: 121248 Tables
- Staff: 29
- Gender: Co-educational
- Age: 3 to 16
- Enrolment: 200
- Proprietor: D Taylor
- Principal: Chris Hamel-Cooke

Wood-Dene School was a private school for the creative arts in the English county of Norfolk in Great Britain, closing during March 2010. The school was located in a former rectory, to which additional facilities have been added.

In 2007 the school was visited privately by Chris Woodhead, formerly HM Chief Inspector of Schools, who stated, "I must have visited thousands of schools in my time. Few compare to Wood-Dene. This is a school which cares for each pupil as an individual, fostering academic potential and social development in a wonderfully idiosyncratic environment! My only complaint is that the school is in Norfolk and not Cornwall because I would love my own grandchildren to be pupils."

== Closure ==
The school was threatened with administration in 2009, but this was prevented by the actions of pupils, parents, staff and administrators at Vantis Business Recovery Services who brokered a deal with Barclay's Bank to keep the school open. On 22 May 2009 the local newspaper, the Eastern Daily Press, carried reports that the school had been saved from closure.

On 1 January 2010 the school publicly celebrated its survival and an improved Ofsted Report, although numbers were reported as having dropped from 158 to 40 pupils.

In March 2010 the school announced that intended to close at the end of the Spring Term after going into voluntary administration, although they would be arranging tuition for pupils sitting their GCSEs. In April it was announced by Caroline Sands, company secretary of Aylmerton Hall, a company formed by parents and grandparents to save the school, that the closure had been caused by a number of parents failing to pay school fees. Nine secondary and four primary age pupils were offered state school places, while the remainder of the final 41 pupils moved to other independent schools.
