= Cognita =

Global private-schools group

- Type: Privately held company
- Industry: Education
- Founded: 2004
- Founder: Chris Woodhead
- Number of locations: 90 schools
- Area served: Worldwide
- Key people: Andreas Tolpeit, Group Chief Executive Officer (Interim) and Group Chief Financial Officer
- Owner: Jacobs Holding, BDT Capital Partners, Sofina
- Number of employees: 21,000
- Website: Cognita

Cognita is a global private schools group which owns and operates schools throughout various countries. The group has over 100 schools and employs 21,000 staff and teaches 95,000 students across 20 countries. Cognita schools teach 14 different curricula, namely National, International Baccalaureate, American (including American Education Reaches Out – Common Core Plus and Advanced Placement), Australian, Spanish, Chilean, Colombian, Greek, Mexican, Indian, Swiss, Italian, Brazilian, Omani and the United Kingdom.

Cognita was founded by the late Chris Woodhead, previously Her Majesty's Chief Inspector of Schools in England.

== History ==
Cognita was formed in October 2004 by its founder management team and Englefield Capital, a private equity firm, now called Bregal Capital, and its former chairman, Sir Chris Woodhead, the former Chief Inspector of Schools in England. From 2004 Cognita started operating its first school, Quinton House School in Northampton. Later in 2004, Cognita acquired the Asquith Court Group, bringing a further 18 schools into the group. From 2004 until 2007, they continued to buy independent schools within the UK.

In 2007, Cognita spread internationally acquiring schools in Spain and Singapore. Cognita established its first school from inception in 2009, Stamford American International School in Singapore. Also in this year, a group of three international schools were purchased in Thailand. Schools in Vietnam joined Cognita in 2011, and in 2012, Cognita bought their first school in South America, in Brazil.

In August 2012, Cognita questioned the financial viability of its Ffynone House School in Swansea. Following lobbying and negotiation by parents and staff of the school, Cognita agreed to surrender the school to its lessor, Ffynone House School charitable trust, from which Cognita had leased the school. Cognita paid the trust £535,000 as a surrender sum and 10 years rent in advance of £270,000 and the school continues to operate with an operating surplus.

On 6 May 2013, the formerly majority British-owned company Cognita agreed to be invested in by the American private equity firm KKR Kohlberg Kravis Roberts L.P. In June 2013, Cognita expanded its network of Latin American schools through a partnership with Desarrollos Educacionales (DDEE), a Chilean private schools group operating nine national curriculum day schools under the Pumahue and Manquecura brands.

In April 2014, Cognita transferred ownership of Ferndale Preparatory School, Faringdon, Oxfordshire, to Ferndale Preparatory School Limited, a parent-led consortium. This filed for administration on 22 July 2016 due to lack of pupil numbers and funding issues, leaving staff redundant. In December 2014, Cognita acquired Instituto GayLussac in Niteroi, Brazil.

In March 2016, Cognita started a school from inception in Chile with the opening of Colegio Pumahue Chicauma. Also in 2016, International School of Barcelona, the English Montessori School in Spain, and St. Andrews International School, Dusit in Thailand joined Cognita.

In September 2017, Cognita opened Stamford American School in Hong Kong. In the same month it opened the Early Learning Village in Singapore with more than 2,000 places. In November 2017, Cognita announced it would be expanding Downsend School in Leatherhead, UK to include a Senior School from September 2020.

In January 2018, Cognita opened a second campus for International School Ho Chi Minh City in Vietnam. In March 2018, The American British School in Chile joined Cognita. In May 2018, Cognita opened BSB Nexus in Spain, a new pre-university campus which is part of The British School of Barcelona. In the same month, Woodland Pre-Schools in Hong Kong joined the Cognita group. On 3 September 2018, global investment firms Bregal Investments and KKR announced the signing of a binding agreement for the sale of Cognita to Jacobs Holding of Switzerland, due to complete in the fourth quarter of 2018, subject to customary regulatory approvals. Also in September 2018, Santo Tomás School, in Ñuñoa, Metropolitan Region, Santiago de Chile, joined Cognita.

In November 2018 and January 2019 respectively, Colegio Europeo de Madrid (CEM) and the British School of Valencia in Spain joined Cognita and became the group's sixth and seventh schools in Spain.

In January 2019, BDT Capital Partners and Sofina became minority owners of Cognita, with Jacobs remaining as majority owner. In February 2019, Colegio San Francisco Javier Huechuraba became Cognita's 13th school in Chile. In July 2019, International School Zurich North joined Cognita, becoming its first school in Switzerland and 74th school globally. In September 2019, Colegio Maxi became Cognita's third school in Brazil. In November 2019, Chirec International School in Hyderabad became Cognita's 1st school in India, and 76th school globally. In December 2019, Centro Educacional Pingo de Gente & Laviniense joined Cognita.

UK independent school Brighton College opened an international school in Singapore with Cognita in August 2020. In September 2020, Mirasur International School in Spain became a Cognita school.

Cognita acquired The Greenland School in Santiago, Chile, in January 2021 and Escola Villare in Brazil in February 2021. In March 2021, Horizon English School became part of Cognita. Obersee Bilingual School in Switzerland and Kindergarten Bilingual School of Florence became part of Cognita in May 2021.

In September 2021, Royal Grammar School Guildford Dubai opened its doors for the first time and Ranches Primary School in Dubai also joined Cognita.

Colegio Internacional Meres in Asturias, Spain, and Horizon International School in Dubai became part of Cognita in February 2022. Dunalastair Schools in Chile joined in May 2022, followed by a strategic alliance with Colegio Olinca in Mexico City marking Cognita's first entry to Mexico.

In September 2022, York Prep School in New York City became the first school to join Cognita in North America.

A strategic alliance with nine Redcol schools in June 2022 marked Cognita's first entry to Colombia.

In April 2023, Repton UAE schools joined Cognita through a strategic partnership with Repton and Excella.

Brighton College Prep Kensington opened in London in September 2023.

In December 2023, FOUR-FOREST Group became Cognita's third school in Switzerland.

Three new schools joined Cognita in 2024: Dasman Bilingual School (Kuwait) in January; Al Ain English Speaking School (UAE) in August; and Doukas School (Greece) in November.

In June 2025, Cognita announced the launch of Cognita AI alongside a strategic partnership with Flint. In August 2025, Cognita launched Masters Academy International in the US and acquired five new schools in Saudi Arabia, Qatar, and Oman. In September, Cognita opened Alleyn's Regent's Park – the first of two new schools to open under a partnership with Alleyn's School. Cognita also confirmed plans to sell 13 UK schools to Outcomes First Group and Wishford Education.

== List of schools ==
=== Europe ===
United Kingdom

- Breaside Preparatory School, Bromley, London
- Brighton College Prep Kensington
- Charterhouse Square School, Islington, London
- Colchester High School, Colchester, Essex
- Downsend School, Leatherhead, Surrey
- Downsend Pre-Preparatory School Leatherhead, Surrey
- Downsend Pre-Preparatory School, Ashtead, Surrey
- Downsend Pre-Preparatory School, Epsom, Surrey
- Glenesk School, East Horsley, Surrey
- King's School, Plymouth, Plymouth, Devon
- North Bridge House Nursery and Pre-Preparatory School, London
- Alleyn's Regent's Park, London(formerly North Bridge House Preparatory School)
- North Bridge House Senior School Hampstead, London
- North Bridge House Senior School Canonbury, London
- St Clare's School, Porthcawl, Wales
- Salcombe Preparatory School, Southgate, London
- Southbank International School Westminster, London
- Southbank International School Kensington, London
- Southbank International School Hampstead, London

Greece

- Doukas School

Italy

- Florence Bilingual School, Florence

Spain

- Colegio Europeo de Madrid, Madrid
- Hastings School of Madrid, Madrid
- The English Montessori School, Madrid
- British School of Barcelona, Barcelona
- El Limonar International School, Murcia, Murcia
- El Limonar International School, Villamartin, Villamartin
- British School of Valencia, Valencia
- Mirasur International School, Pinto, Madrid
- Colegio Internacional Meres, Asturias
- Liceo Sorolla International School, Madrid, Spain

Switzerland

- FOUR-FOREST Bilingual International School, Lucerne
- International School – Zurich North, Zurich
- Obersee Bilingual School, Wollerau (51% ownership)

=== Middle East and South Asia ===
India

- CHIREC International, Hyderabad

Kuwait

- Dasman Bilingual School, Sharq, Kuwait

Oman

- Cheltenham Muscat
- Downe House Muscat

Qatar

- King's College Doha

Saudi Arabia

- Downe House Riyadh
- King's College Riyadh

United Arab Emirates

- Al Ain English Speaking School
- Horizon English School, Dubai
- Horizon International School, Dubai
- Ranches Primary School, Dubai
- Repton Al Barsha
- Repton Abu Dhabi
- Repton Dubai
- Royal Grammar School Guildford, Dubai

=== East Asia ===
Hong Kong

- Stamford American School, Kowloon

Singapore

- Australian International School, Serangoon Gardens
- Stamford American International School, Serangoon
- Brighton College Singapore, co-located with Australian International School and Stamford American International School

Thailand

- St. Andrews International School, Rayong, Rayong
- St. Andrews International School, Sathorn, Bangkok
- St. Andrews International School, Sukhumvit 107, Bangkok
- St. Andrews International School, Dusit, Bangkok

Vietnam

- International School Ho Chi Minh City (ISHCMC), Ho Chi Minh City
- International School Ho Chi Minh City - American Academy (ISHCMC-AA), Ho Chi Minh City

=== Americas ===
Brazil

- PlayPen Bilingual Education, São Paulo
- Instituto GayLussac, Niterói, Rio de Janeiro
- Centro Educacional Pingo de Gente & Laviniense, Manaus
- Escola Villare, São Caetano do Sul

Chile

- Dunalastair School Chicureo
- Dunalastair School Las Condes
- Dunalastair School Peñalolén
- Colegio American British School, Santiago
- Colegio Manquecura Ciudad de Los Valles, Santiago
- Colegio Manquecura Ciudad del Este, Santiago
- Colegio Manquecura Valle lo Campino, Santiago
- Colegio Pumahue Chicauma, Santiago
- Colegio Pumahue Chicureo, Santiago
- Colegio Pumahue Curauma
- Colegio Pumahue Huechuraba, Santiago
- Colegio Pumahue Peñalolén, Santiago
- Colegio Pumahue Puerto Montt, Puerto Montt
- Colegio Pumahue Temuco, Temuco
- Colegio San Francisco Javier Huechuraba
- Colegio Manquecura de Ñuñoa, Santiago
- Greenland School, Santiago

Colombia

- Bureche School (Redcol), Santa Marta
- Colegio Británico de Cartagena (Redcol), Cartagena
- Colegio La Arboleda (Redcol), Cali
- New Cambridge School – Cali (Redcol), Cali
- Colegio Santa Francisca Romana (Redcol), Bogotá
- Gimnasio del Norte (Redcol), Valledupar
- New Cambridge School (Redcol), Bucaramanga
- Newport School (Redcol), Bucaramanga
- Vermont School (Redcol), Medellín

Mexico

- Colegio Olinca, Mexico City

United States

- York Preparatory School, New York, United States

== Controversies ==
Cognita's management of Southbank International School was criticised in 2011, with parents groups claiming it had "no serious interest in maximising the educational experience of ... children if it impacts on their bottom line". Chairman Chris Woodhead responded that Cognita's profitability was comparable to other private operators in the sector, and that the figures claimed by the parents' group were inaccurate.

Also, in 2012, Cognita staff were instructed to impersonate parents and take tours of competing schools in Wales. This conduct was defended as a "normal" way of assessing the competition.

In 2012, Judge Robert Reid QC ruled that the Cognita-owned Milbourne Lodge in Esher, Surrey, had acted unfairly in removing two children, aged eight and six, without warning after the children's parents criticized the school's parents' association, the Friends of Milbourne Lodge, for lack of transparency in its fundraising and spending. The judge said that the parents' association was "somewhat shadowy" and a "shambles".

In 2012, Cognita's director of education, Geraint Jones, was quoted as saying "13 weeks' paid holiday is enough compensation for hard work during term time" and that "teachers have a duty to go beyond their classroom duties", indicating that putting up wall displays, collecting dinner money, performing lunch duties and providing cover are vital tasks of the teaching job and should not be delegated to assistants. Jones also criticised the inefficiency of state schools, saying "it makes me sick".

In 2014, Southbank International School was accused of inadequately vetting staff after a former teacher, William Vahey, was found to have abused pupils over several years. In an article in The Guardian, the school's incoming chairman of governors, Sir Chris Woodhead was interviewed: "The school said it had carried out checks dating back 17 years on Vahey, who had taught in international schools in eight countries. But they did not pick up on a 1969 conviction for child molestation in California. Vahey's CV showed he had been registered as a teacher in the state of New Jersey in 1986, and Woodhead said it was reasonable to have assumed that would not have been the case if he had been convicted of child molestation. 'The system in America broke down,' he said." Regulatory and statutory bodies have since praised the transformation of safeguarding practices and processes in the school as "comprehensive and robust".

In 2025, Cognita sparked angry reactions from parents and stakeholders by announcing the proposed closure of three schools midway through the academic year. Kingscourt School in Hampshire, Oakleigh House in Swansea, and St Clare's School in Porthcawl have all been threatened with closure at the end of the December term 2025. Publicly expressed concerns include the timing of the announcement and the proposed closure, which would leave pupils without suitable alternatives partway through their exams.
