= Geraint Jones (educator) =

British educator

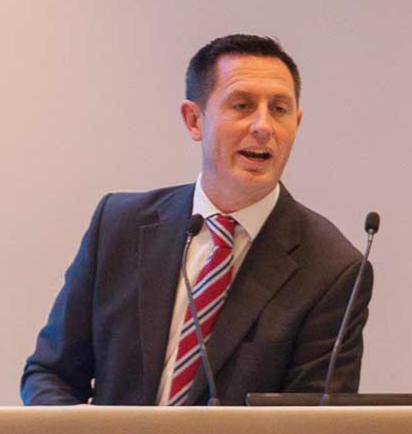
- Title: Professor

Geraint Paul Jones is a British educator.

He is the Founder and CEO of the National Institute of Teaching & Education (NITE), which is part of the Coventry University Group. He holds a Professorship in Education at Coventry University and is their Associate Pro-Vice-Chancellor.

== Career ==
From 2014 to 2018, he served as Dean of the School of Education at the University of Buckingham. He also launched a scholarship programme that awarded £100,000 to local teachers in state-maintained schools.

Previously, Jones was Chief Education Officer at Cognita Schools, the UK’s largest independent school group. During his time there, he publicly criticised inefficiencies in state-maintained schools, stating "It makes me sick". Under his leadership, 43 out of 44 Cognita schools in the UK received a judgement of "Outstanding" or "Good" from Ofsted.

At age 28, Jones became the UK’s youngest Ofsted Inspector. By 31, he had been appointed Head Teacher and Principal of Quinton House School in Northamptonshire, where he led a successful turnaround. The school became one of the country’s highest performing schools for its GCSE results.

Jones has been involved in national and international educational initiatives. He is known for pioneering new school day structures, for which he received a national award. He also developed the "Wake 'n' Shake" physical activity programme.

He is a regular commentator on educational matters in UK national media and is a columnist for the Times Educational Supplement (TES).

Jones played a role in shaping the education strategy behind London’s successful bid for the 2012 Summer Olympics, and represented UK schools at the announcement ceremony in Singapore.

He has also served as an advisor to government education ministries in the UK, Southeast Asia, and the UAE.
