= Martyn Oliver =

British education administrator

Sir Martyn Oliver
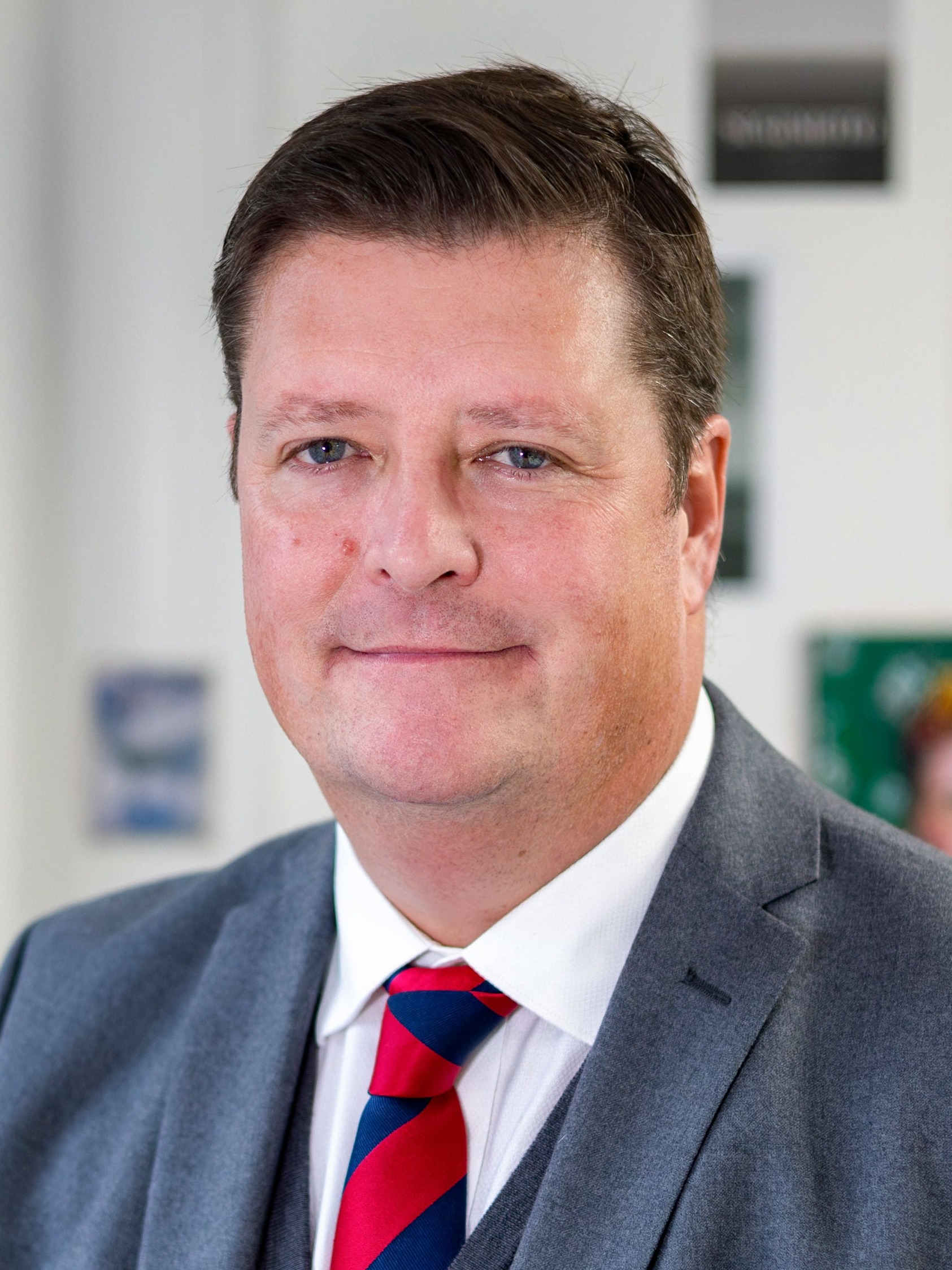
- Official portrait, 2024

His Majesty's Chief Inspector of Education
- Incumbent
- Assumed office 1 January 2024
- Prime Minister: Rishi Sunak; Keir Starmer
- Education Secretary: Gillian Keegan; Bridget Phillipson
- Preceded by: Amanda Spielman

Personal details
- Born: 1972 (age 53–54)

Sir Martyn Ellis Oliver (born March 1972) has served as HM Chief Inspector of Education, Children's Services and Skills in England since 1 January 2024. He has been appointed for a five-year term.

One of his first acts in the role of chief inspector was to announce that Ofsted inspectors would receive training around mental health, following the findings of an inquest into the January 2023 death of headteacher Ruth Perry.

From 2016 to 2023 he was the Chief Executive and Accounting Officer of Outwood Grange Academies Trust (OGAT).

== Honours ==
Oliver was knighted in the 2022 Birthday Honours for services to Education.
