= Working Group for 14–19 Reform =

Former education working group in the United Kingdom

The Working Group for 14–19 Reform was chaired by Mike Tomlinson, former Chief Inspector of Schools at Ofsted. It was formed in Spring 2003 in response to allegations that A-Level grades had been manipulated by some exam boards in order to maintain a consistent standard in the face of changes to the A-Level system. This scandal led to the resignation of the then Secretary of State for Education and Skills Estelle Morris.

This crisis was part of a longer-term concern amongst the British public and, more importantly, British industry that GCSEs and A-Levels were no longer sufficiently taxing to provide a genuine measure of the ability of students. In other words, examinations were seen to be getting easier, a theory partly supported by increasingly impressive results, year-on-year throughout the 1990s.

== The report ==
The Tomlinson Report, as the Final Report of the Working Group on 14–19 Reform was commonly known, was published by the UK Government in October 2004. The proposals, much watered down, were the basis for the 2005 14–19 Education and Skills White Paper.

Key proposals:

- Provide courses which stretch children.
- Ensure that children have basic literacy and numeracy skills.
- Raise the status of vocational qualifications.
- Reduce the amount of assessment and the number of exams.
- Simplify the system - make it easier to carry over achievements from one course of study to the next.
- 14–19 diploma to replace GCSEs, A- and AS-Levels, BTECs and AVCEs.

== Response ==
The Government's response, led by newly appointed (December 2004) Secretary of State Ruth Kelly, was to largely reject these proposals. Most notably absent from the government's white paper was the Working Group's suggestion for an overarching diploma system. In the run up to a General Election, and in the face of strong resistance from the Confederation of British Industry, they chose to reform existing qualifications by making them harder, and more clearly tied to basic skills.

The March 2005 White Paper 14–19 Education and Skills announced the introduction of a new 14–19 Diploma. The first five lines of learning were available from September 2008 in some areas of England. These were: Construction and the Built Environment; Creative and Media; Engineering; Information Technology; and Social, Development and Health. The qualification was closed by the Department for Education in August 2013, and is no longer offered to students.
