= ISY =

Isy or ISY may refer to:

- International Space Year, 1992, a designation to promote space exploration
- International School Yangon, Myanmar
- ISY994i, a home automation controller supporting several protocols

== See also ==
- Izzy, a nickname
