= El Limonar International School, Villamartin =

Coordinates: 37.9450°N 0.7752°W

- Villamartin, Alicante; Spain

Information
- Type: Private, day school
- Established: 1998
- Campus: Non-residential
- Website: ELIS Villamartin website

El Limonar International School, Villamartin - ELIS Villamartin (established in 1998), is a private for-profit school coeducational international school located in Villamartín, (San Miguel de Salinas / Alicante), Spain (not to be confused with the small city Villamartín in the province of Cádiz). The school is owned and operated by the Cognita Group, and educates children from ages 3 to 18 from more than 30 different nations, however the majority of students attending the school are either British or Spanish.

The school highly promotes multilingualism in its pupils, teaching certain lessons in both Spanish and English as well as teaching French, German and Chinese Mandarin separately as part of the curriculum. Students annually celebrate "International Day" in order to promote awareness of multiculturalism and help those students not of Spanish nationality to integrate into the country's culture and immerse themselves in the Spanish language.

ELIS Villamartín uses an educational curriculum based on the National Curriculum for England and Wales. Senior pupils at the school are then prepared for IGCSEs and A Level examinations (Or Bachillerato examinations if they so choose), as well as the Spanish university access examination, “Selectividad”.

The school also offers high level facilities, including a science department with separate Physics, Biology and Chemistry laboratories; an IT room with 24 student computers; a library/extra computer area commonly used by A-Level/Bachillerato students; and a large Drama hall in the loft on the uppermost floor of the building.
