= Stamford American International School =

International school in Singapore established in 2009

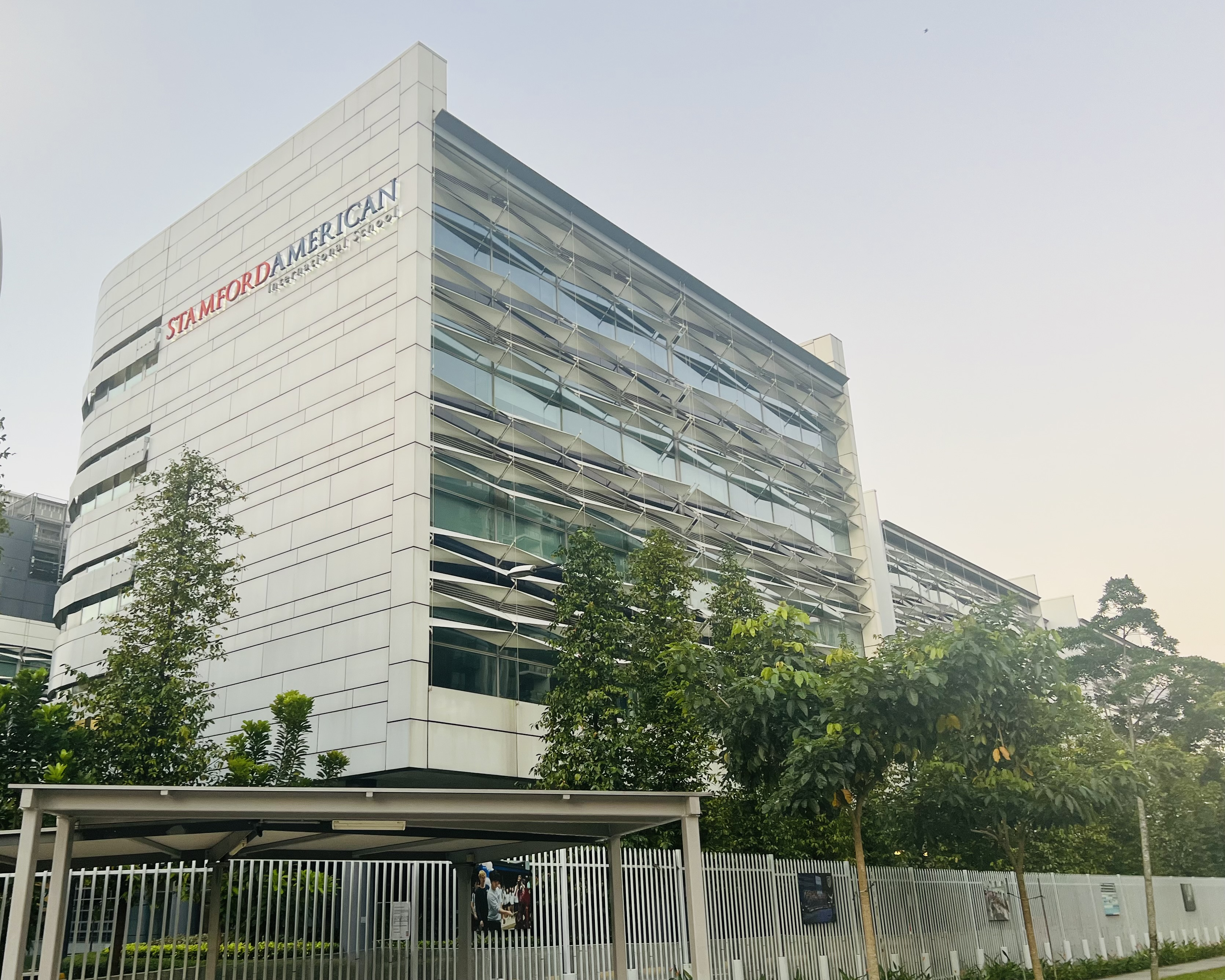
- School building

Location
- Woodleigh: 1 Woodleigh Lane, Singapore, 357684 Early Learning Village: 3 Chuan Lane, Singapore, 554350; Singapore; 01°20′15″N 103°52′10″E

Information
- School type: Private International school
- Established: 30 August 2009; 17 years ago
- Grades: Pre-Nursery to Grade 12
- Student to teacher ratio: Early years – 5–11: 1 Elementary – 12–24: 1 Middle & High school – 24: 1
- Website: https://www.sais.edu.sg/

Stamford American International School (SAIS) is an international school in Singapore. The school is owned and operated by Cognita, and enrolled its first students in August 2009.

Stamford American has two campuses. The Early Years campus, which caters to students from Pre-Nursery to KG2, is located at Chuan Lane, 2.6 km (1.6 mi) away from the Main Campus on Woodleigh Lane, near Woodleigh MRT station, which are dedicated to students from Grades 1 to 12.

== History ==
In August 2008, the Government of Singapore listed the site of the former Upper Serangoon Secondary School as available for the construction of a new international school, to address the need for businesses seeking to recruit employees from other countries. In November, the government announced that Cognita had been chosen to build a new school on the site.

The school was first opened in August 2009 at the Foundation Campus, located at 11 Lorong Chuan, while the purpose-designed permanent campus was being built. Stamford American International School's campus was completed and opened in August 2012.

In August 2017, Stamford American opened a pre-school in collaboration with the Australian International School (AIS).

== Students ==
Stamford American's student body comprises over 75 nationalities across 6 continents. The majority of Stamford American's students come from the United States, Canada, Japan, South Korea, Australia, Taiwan and China. Many cultural events such as the week-long International Fiesta organized by Stamford's Parent Teacher Association (PTA), Lunar New Year, Deepavali, and Christmas are celebrated in school.

== Academic ==
The students graduate with a US-accredited Stamford High School Diploma with the opportunity to pursue an International Baccalaureate Diploma or an Advanced Placement Diploma. As of 2025, Stamford American is ranked 15th out of 17 schools in Singapore by average IB results.

Stamford American offers the opportunity to pursue the International Baccalaureate (IB) Diploma, Advanced Placement (AP) Diploma, or the Business and Technical Education Council (BTEC) Diploma. Stamford American International School is accredited by the Accrediting Commission for Schools, Western Association of Schools and Colleges (WASC). It is also an authorized school for the IB Primary Years Programme (PYP), the IB Middle Years Programme (MYP), and the IB Diploma Programme (IBDP). Stamford American is an IB World School. The school also offers several mother-tongue programs for all students. Stamford American's co-curricular activities (CCA) program has around 350 activity choices throughout the year for students from Pre-K to Grade 12.

=== Arts ===
Stamford American provides productions every year at the Reagan Theater. Weekly drama classes begin in Kindergarten and continue to Grade 10. Stamford American also offers an International Baccalaureate Diploma in Theater and a BTEC in Performing Arts (Acting).

Students at the Early Learning Village (ELV) were offered music at the age of 18 months. From the age of 5, children can move on to cello lessons. Music is a part of the curriculum for students up to Grade 8, while students in Grade 9 and Grade 10 can choose music for their Middle Years Program (MYP) arts allocation. In Grades 11 and 12, students can opt for it as their arts subject within the Diploma Program (DP). More than 400 students are enrolled in the Instrumental Music Program.

=== Athletics ===
Stamford American offers sports for Kindergarten to Grade 12. Stamford American is a member school of the South East Asia Student Activities Conference (SEASAC).

=== Community service ===
The Stamford American community, in partnership with World Assistance for Cambodia, built the Cambodia Hope School in the Boribo Province of Cambodia. In 2016, students and teachers from Stamford American visited the school. Students at Hope School received stationery and sports equipment, while English as a second language resources were distributed to local teachers.

In 2017, together with the Parent Teacher Association (PTA), Stamford American students founded the Christmas Giving Tree. They gifted the Singapore Cancer Society, SOSD, Make-A-Wish Foundation, Waterways, Willing Hearts, Ronald McDonald House, and the Autism Resource Center (ARC).

== Facilities ==
Stamford American has two centrally located campuses that are linked by a shuttle bus service.
