= Workers' Memorial Day =

Commemoration day

- Also called: International Commemoration Day (ICD) for Dead and Injured
- Type: Non-religious, cultural
- Observances: Labour
- Date: April 28

Workers' Memorial Day, also known as International Workers' Memorial Day or International Commemoration Day for Dead and Injured, takes place annually around the world on April 28, an international day of remembrance and action for workers killed, disabled, injured, or made unwell by their work. In Canada, it is commemorated as the National Day of Mourning.

Workers' Memorial Day is an opportunity to highlight the preventable nature of most workplace incidents and ill health and to promote campaigns and union organization in the fight for improvements in workplace safety. The slogan for the day is Remember the dead – Fight for the living.

Although April 28 is used as the focal point for remembrance and a day of international solidarity, campaigning and other related activities continue throughout the year right around the world.

== Origins ==
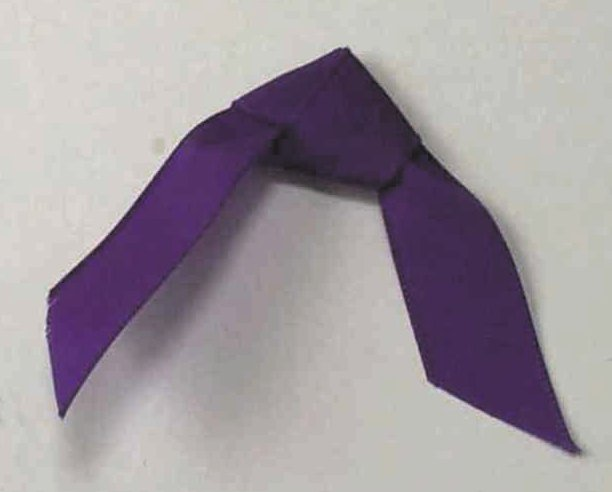
Workers' Memorial Day ribbon

In 1989, the AFL-CIO declared April 28 to be "Workers' Memorial Day", to honor the hundreds of thousands of working people killed and injured on the job every year. April 28 is the anniversary of the date the Occupational Safety and Health Act of 1970 went into effect, and when the Occupational Safety and Health Administration was formed (April 28, 1971).

Previously, in 1984, the Canadian Union of Public Employees (CUPE) established a day of mourning. The Canadian Labour Congress declared an annual day of remembrance in 1985 on April 28, which is the anniversary of a comprehensive Workers' Compensation Act (refer to the entry Workplace Safety & Insurance Board), passed in 1914. In 1991, the Canadian parliament passed an Act respecting a National Day of Mourning for persons killed or injured in the workplace, making April 28 an official Workers' Mourning Day.

== International recognition ==
For years Workers' Memorial Day events have been organized in North America, and then worldwide. Since 1989, trade unions in North America, Asia, Europe and Africa have organized events on April 28. The late Hazards Campaigner Tommy Harte brought Workers' Memorial Day to the UK in 1992 as a day to ‘Remember the Dead: Fight for the Living'. In the UK the campaign for Workers' Memorial Day has been championed by the Hazards Campaign and taken up by trade unions, adopted by Scotland's TUC in 1993, followed by the TUC in 1999, and the Health and Safety Commission and Health and Safety Executive in 2000.

April 28 is recognised by the International Labour Organization (ILO) and the International Trade Union Confederation (ITUC) as International Workers' Memorial Day. In 1996, the ICFTU commemorated Workers' Memorial Day and began to set annual 'themes'. For 2006, the ICFTU theme was Union workplaces: safer workplaces, focusing on a global ban on asbestos and increased awareness of HIV/AIDS. During 2001, the ILO, part of the United Nations (UN), recognised Workers' Memorial Day and declared it World Day for Safety and Health at Work and in 2002, the ILO announced that April 28 should be an official day in the UN system.

Workers' Memorial Day is recognised as a national day in many countries including: Australia, Argentina, Belgium, Bermuda, Brazil, Canada, Dominican Republic, Gibraltar, Ireland, Luxembourg, Panama, Peru, Portugal, Spain, Thailand, Taiwan, United States, and the United Kingdom. Trade unions in other countries including Benin, Czech Republic, Finland, Hungary, Malta, Nepal, New Zealand, Romania, and Singapore are pursuing government recognition.

Workers' Memorial Day is now an international day of remembrance of workers killed in incidents at work, or by diseases caused by work, and annually on April 28, Workers' Memorial Day events are held throughout the world. Some examples include active campaigning, and workplace awareness events. Public events include speeches, multi-faith religious services, laying wreaths, planting trees, unveiling monuments, balloon releases, raising public awareness of issues, and laying out empty shoes to symbolize those who have died at work.

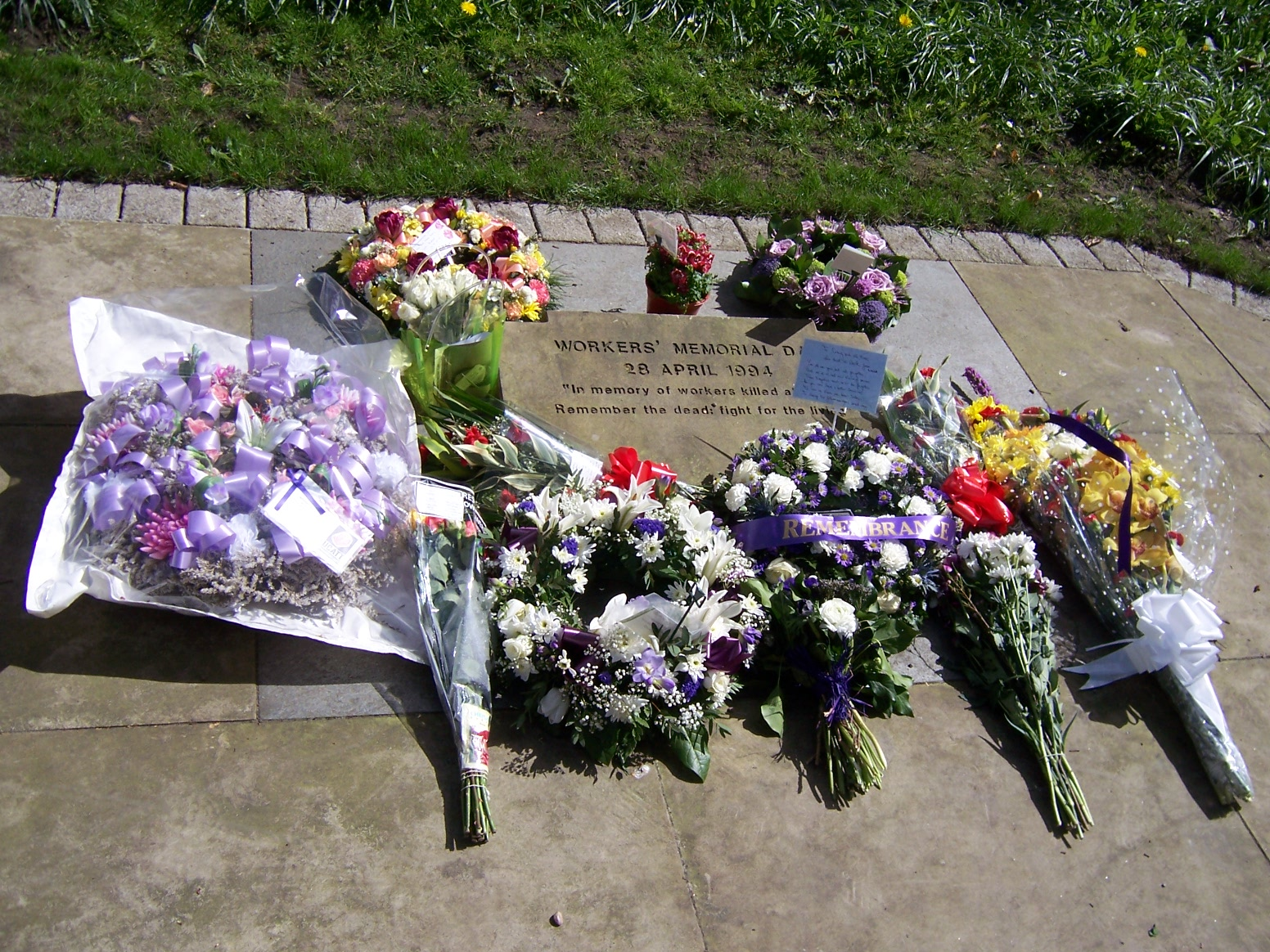
Manchester Workers' Memorial

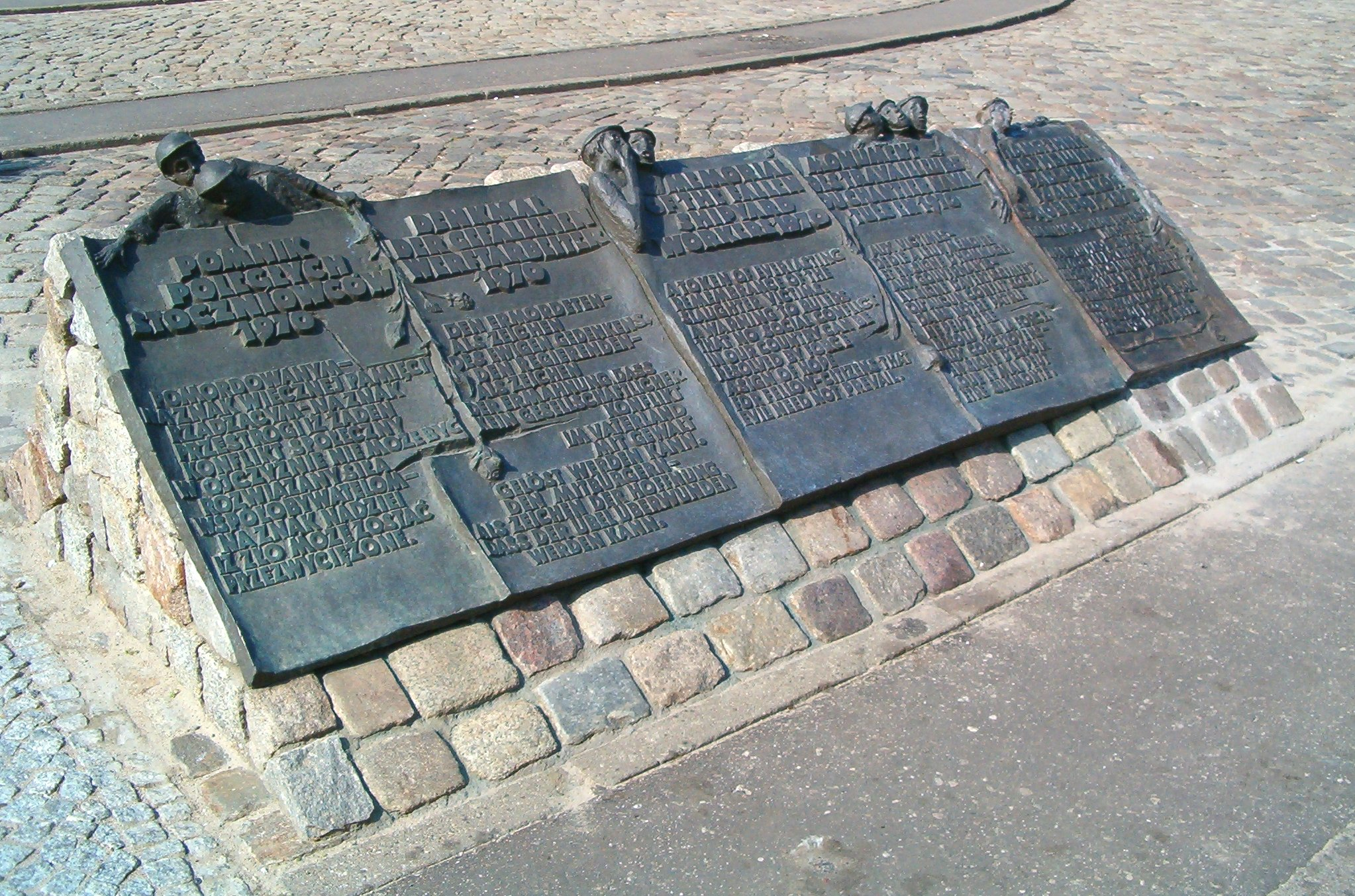
Memorial of Fallen in 1970 Shipyard Workers. Gdansk, Poland

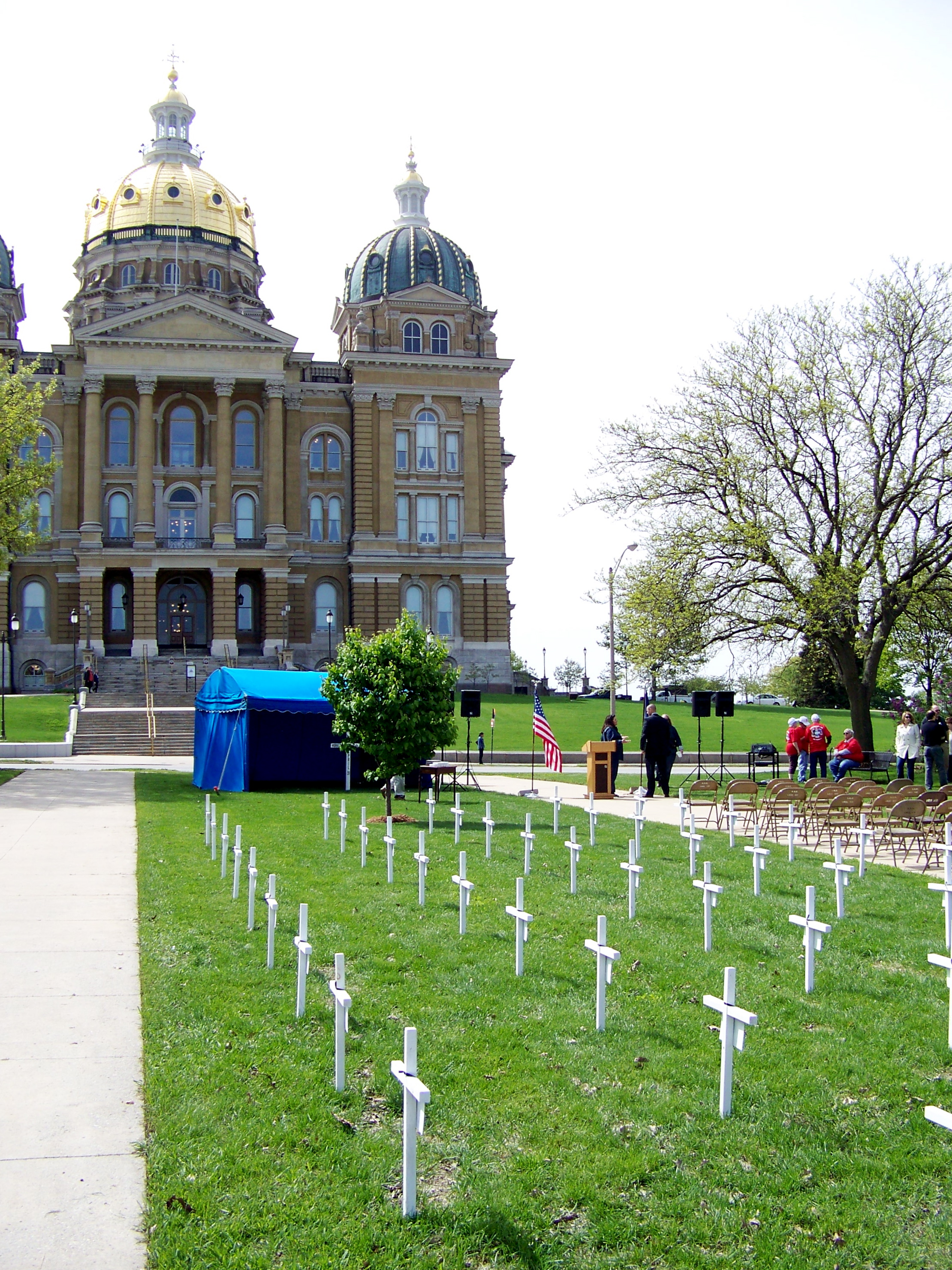
Workers Memorial Day in Iowa, 2007

=== World Day for Safety and Health at Work ===
World Day for Safety and Health at Work
- Observed by: Workers Worldwide (Geneva for the year 2011)
- Type: International
- Significance: work environment, occupational safety and health
- Date: April 28 (annually)
- Related to: International Workers' Day, Labour Day, Labor Day

World Day for Safety and Health at Work is a UN international day that is celebrated every April 28. It is concerned about safe work and awareness of the dimensions and consequences of work-related accidents and diseases; to place occupational safety and health (OSH) on the international and national agendas; and to provide support to the national efforts for the improvement of national OSH systems and programmes in line with relevant international labor standards.

The 2011 World Day for Safety and Health at Work focuses on the implementation of an Occupational Safety and Health Management System (OSHMS) as a tool for continual improvement in the prevention of workplace incidents and accidents.

=== Bangladesh ===
Bangladesh Garment Sramik Sanghati, an organization working for the welfare of garment workers, has requested that April 24 be declared Labour Safety Day in Bangladesh, in memory of the victims of the Rana Plaza building collapse.

== See also ==
- National Safety Council
- United Nations Regional Information Centre
- Work accident
