= Michael Wilshaw =

British Inspector of Schools

Sir Michael Wilshaw
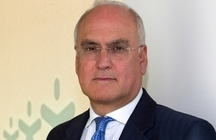

Her Majesty’s Chief Inspector of Education, Children’s Services and Skills
- In office 1 January 2012 – 30 December 2016
- Prime Minister: David Cameron; Theresa May
- Minister: Michael Gove; Nicky Morgan; Justine Greening
- Preceded by: Christine Gilbert
- Succeeded by: Amanda Spielman

Sir Michael Wilshaw (born 3 August 1946) was the Chief Inspector of Schools in England and head of Ofsted from 2012 until 2016.

A teacher by profession, he is a former headteacher of St Bonaventure's and Mossbourne Community Academy, and was briefly interim Headmaster and later executive principal of JFS.

== Career ==
The son of a postman, Wilshaw grew up in a Roman Catholic household in south London in the 1950s. He went to Clapham College, a south London grammar school, and then St Mary's teacher training college in Twickenham. He later studied part-time for a History degree at Birkbeck College while teaching in various London schools. At the age of 39 he was appointed head teacher of St Bonaventure's Catholic School, also known informally as St. Bon's, in Forest Gate, London. Whilst there, he was knighted in the New Year Honours for 2000 "for services to education".

In 2003, Wilshaw was appointed executive principal of Mossbourne Community Academy in Hackney in London.

In November 2011, Wilshaw was announced as the successor to Christine Gilbert as Her Majesty's Chief Inspector of Schools at Ofsted. He took up his five-year term from 1 January 2012. In 2015, Wilshaw was paid a salary of between £195,000 and £199,999 by Ofsted, making him one of the 328 most highly paid people in the British public sector at that time.

Speaking on BBC TV's The Andrew Marr Show in the wake of the GCSE English results controversy in August 2012, Wilshaw said the row was a "really good opportunity" to examine whether examinations were "rigorous enough", adding that "Two-thirds of our schools are good or better. We have got a third of schools, 6,000 schools, that are not good, that are satisfactory and below. We have to make sure that schools know they have got to get to good soon as possible. We have given them a prescribed period of time, up to four years, in which to get to good."

From 1 January 2017 Wilshaw has been a board member of the Education Policy Institute, a Westminster-based research institute.

In February 2021, speaking on BBC Newsnight about schools re-opening on 8 March during the coronavirus pandemic, Wilshaw said that medical professionals have "gone the extra mile at great cost to themselves and their families, their health - they have sacrificed their lives in some cases. We need a similar commitment from the teaching profession over the next academic year."

In June 2021, Wilshaw became headmaster of JFS school until the end of the 2021 summer term. He then became the school’s executive principal following the end of his tenure as headmaster. He is also the Chief Academic Adviser to the Lyceum International School.

== Offices held ==
Government offices
Preceded by Christine Gilbert	Chief Inspector at Ofsted; 2012 – 2016	Succeeded by Amanda Spielman
