= Death of Ruth Perry =

2023 suicide in England

Ruth Perry
- Born: Ruth Carla Perry; 1969; Caversham
- Died: 8 January 2023
- Cause of death: Suicide, contributed to by an Ofsted inspection carried out in November 2022.

Ruth Perry was a British head teacher who died by suicide on 8 January 2023 while awaiting the publication of an Ofsted report which downgraded her school's rating from "outstanding" to "inadequate".

== Background ==
=== Ruth Perry ===
Ruth Carla Perry was raised in Caversham, a suburb of Reading, in Berkshire, England. She was the head teacher of Caversham Primary School in Reading for 13 years.

=== Ofsted ===
Ofsted is a non-ministerial department that inspects all state-funded schools in England.

== Inspection and death ==
Caversham Primary School (CPS) underwent an Ofsted inspection on 15 and 16 November 2022. This was the first Ofsted inspection that CPS had had for 13 years as there was previously a policy that meant schools rated outstanding were not inspected in line with usual timescales. This policy changed in 2021, and CPS was therefore due for an inspection.

A private memorial service was held at Reading Town Hall.

== Coroner's inquest ==
The inquest by Heidi Connor, Senior Coroner for Berkshire, concluded on 12 December 2023. The coroner concluded that Perry's death was a result of "Suicide, contributed to by an Ofsted inspection carried out in November 2022".

School teaching and leadership unions had also reacted to Ms Perry's death by calling for a pause to Ofsted inspections and reiterating long-standing calls for reform of the inspection system.

== Independent review ==
An independent review of Ofsted's response to the death was conducted by Dame Christine Gilbert and found that the agency was "defensive and complacent".

== Aftermath ==
=== Reforms ===
Prior to the 2024 general election, teaching and leadership unions intensified their calls for reform of the inspection regime. These calls were amplified following the death of Ruth Perry. On 2 September 2024, the Labour government announced single- or two-word overall effectiveness judgements for schools would cease with immediate effect. A new "scorecard" system would be introduced by 2025.
