= Julius Weinberg =

British academic

Professor Julius Weinberg

Chair of Ofsted
- In office 11 April 2017 – 31 July 2020
- Prime Minister: Theresa May; Boris Johnson
- Education Secretary: Justine Greening; Damian Hinds; Gavin Williamson
- Preceded by: James Kempton (interim)
- Succeeded by: Christine Ryan

Chair of Ofqual
- In office Interim; 1 December 2016 – 31 December 2016
- Prime Minister: Theresa May
- Education Secretary: Justine Greening
- Preceded by: Amanda Spielman
- Succeeded by: Roger Taylor

Personal details
- Born: United Kingdom
- Died: 16 September 2026
- Occupation: Academic, chancellor

Julius Weinberg (27 December 1954 - 16 September 2026) was a British academic and previously the Vice-Chancellor of Kingston University (2011-16) and of Deputy VC of City University.

He studied medicine at The Queen's College, Oxford and later gained a degree in Art History from the Open University.

Weinberg was a governor of the Independent school Latymer Upper School in Hammersmith.

On 11 April 2017, Secretary of State for Education Justine Greening announced the appointment of Weinberg as the next Chair of Ofsted. He also chaired Ormiston Academies Trust (2022-26),

Weinberg died unexpectedly, while walking in Scotland, on 16 September 2026.
