= Amanda Spielman, Baroness Spielman =

British education administrator

The Right Honourable The Baroness Spielman
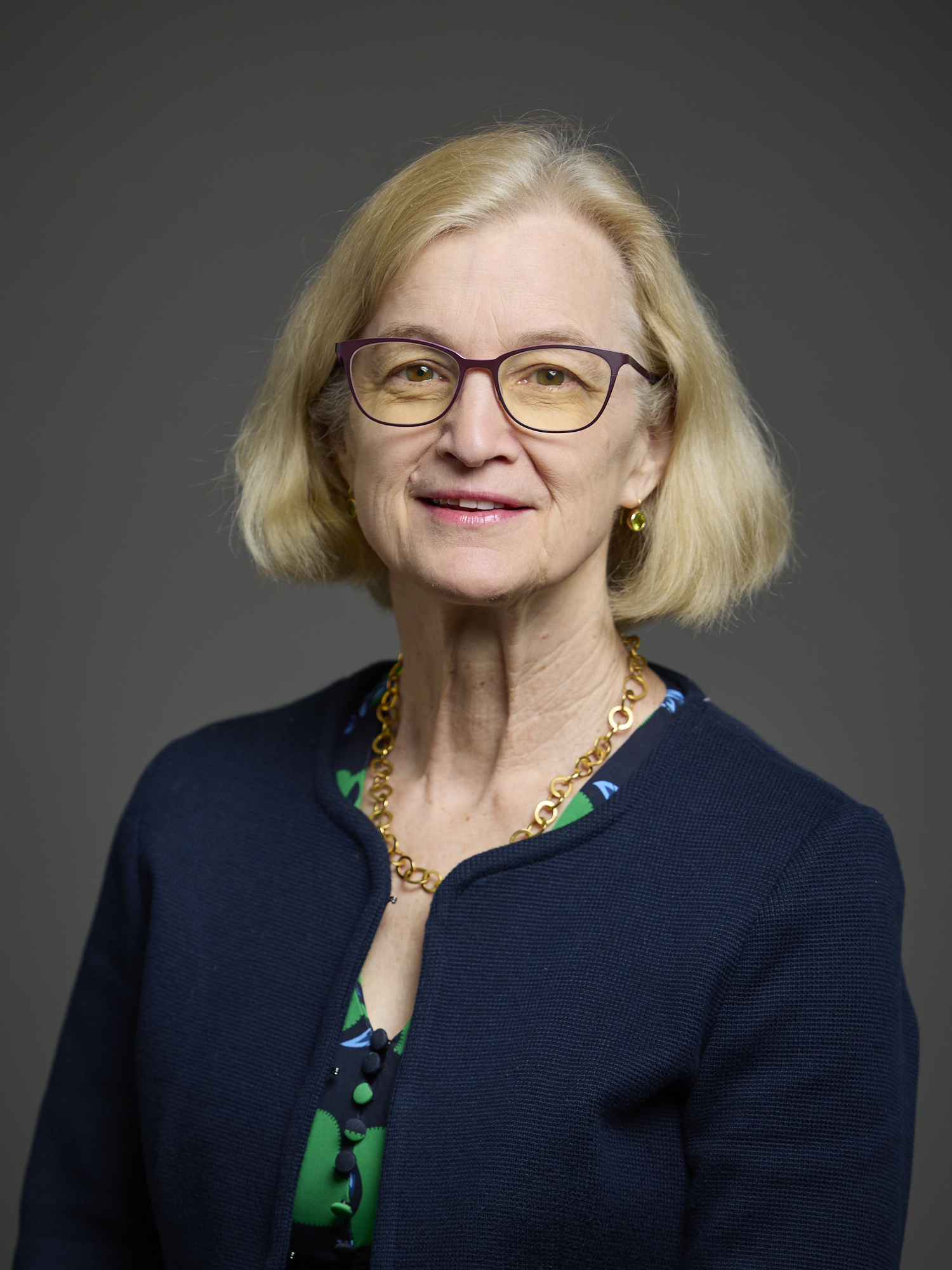
- Official portrait, 2026

His Majesty’s Chief Inspector of Education
- In office 1 January 2017 – 31 December 2023
- Prime Minister: Theresa May; Boris Johnson; Liz Truss; Rishi Sunak
- Education Secretary: Justine Greening; Damian Hinds; Gavin Williamson; Nadhim Zahawi; Michelle Donelan; James Cleverly; Kit Malthouse; Gillian Keegan
- Preceded by: Sir Michael Wilshaw
- Succeeded by: Martyn Oliver

Chair of Ofqual
- In office 14 July 2011 – 30 November 2016
- Prime Minister: David Cameron; Theresa May
- Education Secretary: Michael Gove; Nicky Morgan; Justine Greening
- Preceded by: Kathleen Tattersall (2010)^{[a]}
- Succeeded by: Julius Weinberg (interim)

Chief Regulator of Ofqual
- In office Interim; 1 March 2016 – 24 April 2016
- Prime Minister: David Cameron
- Education Secretary: Nicky Morgan
- Preceded by: Dame Glenys Stacey
- Succeeded by: Sally Collier
- In office 14 July 2011 – 31 March 2012
- Prime Minister: David Cameron
- Education Secretary: Michael Gove
- Preceded by: Kathleen Tattersall (2010)^{[a]}
- Succeeded by: Dame Glenys Stacey

Member of the House of Lords
- Lord Temporal
- Life peerage 9 May 2025

Personal details
- Born: Amanda Mary Victoria Robinson; 22 May 1961 (age 65) London, England, UK
- Party: Conservative
- Spouse: Adam Spielman (m. 1996)
- Parent(s): Sebastian Robinson (father); Olivia Robinson (mother)
- Education: Clare College, Cambridge
- a. Office vacant from 3 July 2010 to 13 July 2011

Amanda Mary Victoria Spielman, Baroness Spielman ACA (née Robinson; born 22 May 1961) is a British Conservative politician and former civil servant and executive who served as HM Chief Inspector of Education, Children's Services and Skills from January 2017 to December 2023. She joined the senior leadership team at Ark Schools in 2005. From 2011 to 2016, Spielman was Chair of Ofqual.

== Early life and education ==
Spielman was born in North Kensington, London, the daughter of Olivia and Sebastian Robinson. Aged five, she moved to Glasgow for her mother's lecturing job where Spielman attended Notre Dame, a state primary convent school.

She was then privately educated, boarding at her mother's old school in Dorset from the age of ten, and then attending St Paul's Girls' School in Hammersmith for sixth form.

Spielman then gained a place at Clare College, Cambridge, initially studying Mathematics before switching to Law at the end of her first year. She graduated with a BA degree in 1982.

Her first marriage, in 1983, ended in divorce. She married Adam Justin Spielman, managing director at Citigroup, in 1996. They live in London and have two children.

== Financial industry career ==
With KMG Thomson McLintock from 1982 to 1986 and then Kleinwort Benson from 1986 to 1992, she served as a director of Newstead Capital from 1992 until 1994 and of Bridgewater Business Analysis from 1994 to 1995.

She became a principal at Mercer Management Consulting in Boston, Massachusetts from 1995 to 1997, then at Nomura Principal Finance from 1997 to 2004.

== Education administration ==
After pursuing further studies in Comparative Education at the Institute of Education, University of London, she received a Master of Arts degree in 2002.

From 2005 onwards Spielman was a founding member of the management team at Ark Schools. From 2011 to 2016 she chaired Ofqual, the examinations and qualifications regulator, overseeing the 2012 English GCSE grading "fiasco".

=== Ofsted appointment ===
In June 2016, Spielman was selected by the Education Secretary, Nicky Morgan, to take over as Chief Inspector of Ofsted to replace Sir Michael Wilshaw. Following a pre-appointment hearing, Spielman's nomination was rejected by the Education Select Committee which expressed concerns about her suitability, citing her lack of teaching experience and her failure to show "passion" and lack of understanding for the "complex role". Mrs Morgan, however, dismissed such objections and in her capacity as Cabinet minister wrote to Neil Carmichael, the Committee's chairman, confirming her appointment of Spielman.

In 2021 it was reported she was seeking an extension to her five-year tenure due to the Covid crisis interrupting the roll out of her new inspection framework. A two-year extension was confirmed in May.

=== Policy positions ===
In 2018, Spielman supported a primary school headteacher's right to set a uniform policy that did not permit hijab for pupils in Key Stage 1 (ages 4–7). The UK's National Education Union (NEU) described this as "naked racism dressed up as liberalism".

In 2018, she backed a ban on mobile phones in classrooms. In the same speech, she urged strict pupil discipline, saying "there is nothing kind about letting a few pupils spoil school for everyone else".

In December 2018, Spielman asserted that basic parenting duties should not be outsourced to schools and teachers: for instance, potty training was "a normal part of parenting in every other country" and it was "startling" that any British parents could allow their children to continue wearing nappies for years.

In 2019, she said that students who had sexual assault allegations made against them should be free to continue attending school along with their accusers. This contradicted Ofsted's own guidance and led to criticism that her lack of understanding of basic safeguarding procedures made her unfit to be head of Ofsted.

In June 2021 she declared Years 11 and 13 (ages 16 and 18) should be kept in schools despite the cancellation of exams and the substantial extra workload imposed on teachers as a result, and said Ofsted would "want to know how" schools were using contact time with Year 11. This was strongly criticised by teachers, who said that most of Years 11 and 13 saw no point in staying after exams had been cancelled.

Following the death of headteacher Ruth Perry in 2023, Spielman acknowledged that "a culture of fear exists over the watchdog's inspections". A coroner investigating Perry's suicide found that the Ofsted inspection of her school "contributed" to her death and found the inspection "lacked fairness, respect and sensitivity" and was at times "rude and intimidating"" Perry's death had resulted in calls for one-word inspection judgements given by Ofsted to be scrapped, something Spielman insisted "was up the government" to change, and that such one-word judgements "weren't wrong".

Spielman's term as head of Ofsted ended in December 2023 and she was replaced by Martyn Oliver, who immediately ordered a suspension in inspections whilst training was improved.

== House of Lords ==
On 11 April 2025, it was announced that Kemi Badenoch, leader of the Conservative Party, had nominated Spielman for a life peerage. She was created as Baroness Spielman, of Durlston in the County of Dorset on 9 May 2025 and took her seat as a Conservative member of the House of Lords three days later.
