= El Limonar International School, Murcia =

Coordinates: 37.92596°N 1.15974°W

- Murcia, Region of Murcia; Spain

Information
- Type: Private, day school
- Established: 1990
- Enrolment: 1000+
- Campus: Non-residential
- Website: ELIS Murcia website

El Limonar International School, Murcia - ELIS Murcia is a private profit-making coeducational international school located in Murcia, Spain. The school is owned and operated by the Cognita Group, and educates children from ages 3 to 18 from more than 20 nations. However the majority of students attending the school are Spanish.

ELIS Murcia uses an educational curriculum based on the National Curriculum for England and Wales. Senior pupils at the school are then prepared for GCSEs and A Level examinations, The American University Entrance Exam SAT and TOEFL as well as the Spanish university access examination “Selectividad”.

The school was selected by the national newspaper El Mundo as one of the top 100 schools in Spain in 2019, as well as in the last years.

== See also ==
- Universidad Popular de Cartagena
