= Mike Tomlinson =

Former teacher and Chief Inspector of Schools

Sir Michael John Tomlinson

Her Majesty’s Chief Inspector of Education, Children’s Services and Skills
- In office 2000–2002
- Prime Minister: Tony Blair
- Preceded by: Chris Woodhead
- Succeeded by: David Bell

Personal details
- Born: 17 October 1942 Rotherham, England
- Spouse: Maureen Janet Tupling (m. 1965)
- Children: 1
- Education: University of Durham; University of Nottingham

Sir Michael John Tomlinson CBE (born 17 October 1942 in Rotherham), known as Mike Tomlinson, is an educationalist, formerly a teacher and Her Majesty's Chief Inspector of Education, Children's Services and Skills. He also chaired the Working Group for 14–19 Reform which was cited when he was knighted in 2005.

He was known as "the safest pair of hands in English education".

== Early life ==
He passed the 11-plus and attended the Oakwood Technical High School (now the Oakwood Technology College) in Rotherham and Bournemouth Boys' School (a grammar school).

He studied for a BSc in chemistry at the University of Durham before going on to do a Postgraduate Certificate in Education at the University of Nottingham, followed by 12 years in the classroom as a science teacher, including some time on secondment to Imperial Chemical Industries as a schools liaison officer in 1977.

== Career ==
=== Teaching ===
He was a chemistry teacher at the Henry Mellish Grammar School (now called The Bulwell Academy) on Highbury Road in Bulwell, Nottingham from 1965 to 1969. From 1969 to 1977, he was head of chemistry at Ashby-de-la-Zouch Grammar School (a comprehensive school and now called Ashby School) in Leicestershire.

=== Education administration ===
In 1978 he joined Her Majesty's Inspectorate of Schools (now Ofsted) and, in this capacity, helped to re-establish the education system in Kuwait following the first Gulf War. In 1989, he became chief inspector (secondary). In November 2000 when Chris Woodhead resigned, he became Chief Inspector of Schools, a post which he held until his retirement in 2002.

=== Retirement ===
Shortly after his retirement, he led an enquiry into the controversy surrounding A-level grading, and was then appointed chair of the 14–19 Working Group in 2003. He is also a governor of the University of Hertfordshire, a member of the boards of the Qualifications and Curriculum Authority and the National Assessment Agency, a member of the Public Engagement group of the Science Museum, and a fellow and a member of the council of the Royal Society of Arts. Since 2008, he has been chief adviser for London Schools in the Department for Children, Schools and Families.

== Recognition ==
In 1997 he was made a CBE. Tomlinson was made a knight in the New Year's Honours list of 31 December 2004.

== Personal life ==
In 1965, he married Maureen Janet Tupling in Rotherham. They have a son (born 1968) and a daughter (born 1970). His children initially went to comprehensive schools, but later went to grammar schools.

Preceded by Chris Woodhead	Chief Inspector at Ofsted; 2000-2002	Succeeded by David Bell
