= South East Asia Student Activities Conference =

Association of international schools in and around Southeast Asia

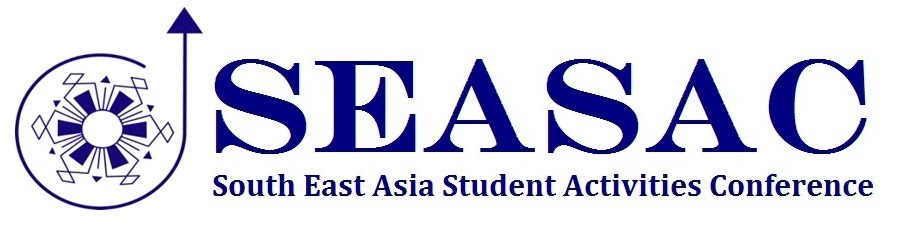

Established in 1995, the South East Asia Student Activities Committee (SEASAC) is an association of international schools in and around Southeast Asia.

"The purpose of the organization is to promote student/school activities which provide and encourage opportunities for healthy competition, pursuit of excellence, social and cultural interaction and the development of friendships within the region of South East Asia."

== Member Schools ==
=== Hong Kong ===
- Canadian International School of Hong Kong

=== Indonesia ===
- British School Jakarta

=== Malaysia ===
- Alice Smith School
- Garden International School
- Mont' Kiara International School

=== Myanmar ===
- International School Yangon

=== Singapore ===
- Tanglin Trust School
- United World College of South East Asia (Dover)
- United World College of South East Asia (East)
- Stamford American International School
- Australian International School
- Singapore American School

=== Thailand ===
- Bangkok Patana School
- NIST International School
- Ruamrudee International School
- Harrow International School
- Rugby School Thailand

=== Vietnam ===
- Saigon South International School

== Sports & Activities ==
=== Season 1 (Oct - Nov) ===
- Football (Division I, II)
- Volleyball (Division I, II)
- Golf
- Cross Country

=== Season 2 (Jan - Feb) ===
- Basketball (Division I, II)
- Boys Rugby
- Girls Touch Rugby (Division I, II)
- Tennis (Division I, II)

=== Season 3 (Feb - Mar) ===
- Badminton (Division I, II, III)
- Swimming (Division I, II)
- Softball
- Gymnastics
- Climbing
- Track and Field
- Model United Nations

=== Others ===
- Arts Festival
- Model United Nations
- Music
- Dance
