= William Vahey =

American criminal (1949–2014)

William James Vahey
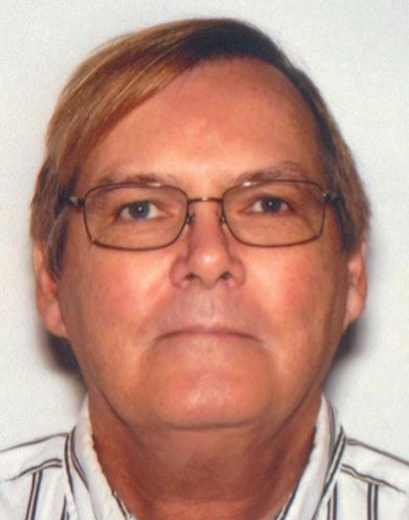
- Born: May 7, 1949; West Point, New York, U.S.
- Died: March 21, 2014 (aged 64); Luverne, Minnesota, U.S.
- Occupation: Schoolteacher
- Children: 2
- Criminal charges: Child molestation
- Penalty: 90 days in prison and five years' probation

William James Vahey (May 7, 1949 – March 21, 2014) was an American expatriate schoolteacher and convicted child molester.

== Biography ==
Vahey was born in 1949 at West Point, New York, to a decorated World War II pilot father. He was sexually molested as a child. He graduated from college in 1972. In January 1973, he moved to Iran, where he taught at Tehran American School until 1973, after which he taught at other schools in Lebanon, Spain, Greece, Saudi Arabia, and Venezuela. From 1992 to 2002, he taught at Jakarta International School in Indonesia. In 2009, he began teaching history and geography at Southbank International School in London. He continued to work there until 2013.

In August 2013, he began teaching at the American Nicaraguan School in Managua and remained a teacher there until his death. He also coached basketball and led school trips to Bahrain, Turkey, Africa, Costa Rica, Nepal, Panama and Jordan. During this time, he kept homes in London and Hilton Head Island.

== Child molestation ==
Vahey was arrested in 1969 at the age of 20 for child molestation, after which he told the police he began touching boys without their consent when he was 14, as a Boy Scout. After pleading guilty to one charge of lascivious behavior, he was sentenced to 90 days in jail and 5 years of probation, but was allowed to leave the United States unsupervised and move to Iran after two years. He registered as a sex offender in January 1970 but failed to sign the sex offender registry, which, according to the BBC, was the reason his previous abuses went undetected by school officials.

In March 2014, he was confronted about obscene images of boys found on his flash drive by an administrator of his employer, the American Nicaraguan School. The flash drive in question had originally been stolen by a maid at the school, but it wasn't until she gave it to school director Gloria Doll that its contents became known. Doll found the flash drive contained sexually graphic images of at least 90 boys being molested by Vahey, catalogued by locations and dates corresponding to field trips Vahey went on beginning in 2008. After being confronted, Vahey confessed he had been molesting boys for his entire life, attributing this to him having himself been molested as a child. Some of his victims, according to the FBI, had been drugged and may therefore have no memory of their abuse; he would offer them Oreo cookies laced with sleeping pills.

On April 22, Metropolitan Police officers raided Vahey's residence in north-east London, where they found a laptop and 11 more flash drives. According to the FBI, hundreds of people have contacted them and said that either Vahey molested them or they wanted to provide more information in their investigation into his abuses.

=== Reactions ===
Southbank International School's chair of governors, Sir Chris Woodhead, reacted to the news of Vahey's crimes by describing them as the "worst thing that I've ever been involved in in 40 years of education"; that Vahey was able to teach at Southbank despite having been convicted for child molestation in 1969 "beggars belief". According to Scotland Yard commander Graham McNulty, "a significant number" of parents of Southbank students told officials they did not want to know if Vahey had molested their children.

After Vahey's long history of child abuse came to light, Gloria Doll said that he had become "famous for wanting to lead student experience trips", and that this was the reason many of his previous schools hired him. She also said that, to her knowledge, none of her students had been molested by him. Doll faced some criticism for not acting sooner to stop him from doing so while she was director of the American Nicaraguan School. Three of the school's employees wrote an anonymous letter stating that Doll, after acquiring Vahey's memory stick, fired him but still let him go home. Doll said she had consulted a school board member and the school's lawyer prior to making this decision and said the lawyer had told her that since none of the children in the photos had been molested in Nicaragua, they had no obligation to contact authorities. The employees pointed out that child pornography is illegal in Nicaragua no matter what. After she resigned her position at the school on May 20, many speculated that this was for reasons relating to her handling of this scandal. Nevertheless, the school board, who had supported her for the previous several weeks, treated her resignation as a routine matter that had nothing to do with the Vahey scandal.

=== Hugh Davies investigation ===
An investigation by barrister Hugh Davies, the interim findings of which were released on July 31, 2014, concluded that Southbank International did not properly address concerns about Vahey's behavior while he taught there, and that they failed to take references before offering him a teaching job. The review also criticized the school for "inadequate" record keeping. Woodhead commended the report for its "very helpful recommendations on how safeguarding at Southbank International School can be improved yet further." According to the BBC, another stage of the investigation is under development, and will focus on "the recruitment procedure when Vahey was hired and how incidents concerning his behaviour were reported." In November 2014, The Guardian reported on a subsequent report by Davies, which concluded that Southbank International's headmaster dismissed complaints against Vahey's conduct on a field trip as "unfair pressure" by "vindictive parents", and did not report these complaints to child protection authorities.

== Lawsuit ==
On June 22, 2014, The Observer reported that the parents of about 60 children believed to have been abused by Vahey while he taught at Southbank had sued the school. The parents will be advised by lawyers from London-based firm Edwin Coe LLP. It was also reported that Chris Woodhead, the founder of Southbank's parent company, Cognita, intended to commission a barrister to determine how Vahey was allowed to work at the school, which has said that they made checks dating back 17 years on Vahey's background.

== Efforts to seek compensation ==
On June 14, 2016, it was reported that families of more than a dozen current and former Southbank pupils (all of whom attended the school while Vahey taught there) were attempting to negotiate a financial settlement of as much as £1.5 million with the school. A lawyer representing the families told the Guardian that if these negotiations failed, they might take legal action against the school.

== Suicide ==
Vahey's first attempt at suicide occurred in Nicaragua immediately after a school maid stole his flash drive. Emergency officials initially declared him dead with high levels of toxins in his blood. However, he was eventually revived and survived the attempt.

On March 21, 2014, he committed suicide in Luverne, Minnesota, by stabbing himself in the chest. Vahey was 64 years old. He was married and had two adult children.
