= Southbank International School =

Location
- 377-381 Euston Road; London, NW1 3AU; England; 51.5216°N 0.1460°W

Information
- Type: International school
- Motto: 'A school without walls'
- Established: 1979
- Founder: Milton Toubkin
- Executive Principal: Siobhan McGrath
- Gender: Co-educational
- Age: 2 to 18
- Principal – Hampstead: Stuart Bain
- Principal – Kensington: David Macmorran
- Principal – Westminster: Angela Liu
- Website: http://www.southbank.org/

Southbank International School is a co-educational private school located in the City of Westminster, Kensington and Hampstead, London, England. It is an international school for 2 to 18-year olds, from early childhood to Key Stage 5. It has three campuses serving the educational needs of the international community in central London and surrounding areas.

It is an International Baccalaureate World School, authorised to deliver all three of the International Baccalaureate programmes. Southbank Hampstead and Southbank Kensington are both IB Primary Years Programme (PYP; from Early Childhood to grade 5) schools. Southbank Westminster offers the IB Middle Years Programme (MYP; grade 6 to 10) and the IB Diploma Programme (grades 11 and 12).

The Southbank Westminster campus occupies three sites at Portland Place, Conway Street and Cleveland Street (by Fitzroy Square). The school's Cleveland Street campus was the most recent to open, in September 2018.

== History ==
Southbank International School was founded on 12 September 1979 as the American International School. It opened in September 1980 in a disused primary school on the south bank of the River Thames near Waterloo station with 80 upper school students. In line with its founding principles, the school's name was changed to Southbank American International School, following staff and pupil suggestions.

In 1982 the school moved to Eccleston Square near Victoria Station and by 1985 a secondary section was added, and the IB Diploma Programme was eventually adopted. In 1987 the School's name changed again to Southbank International School.

In January 1989 the School moved to the present Kensington campus, and with a growing demand for places the Hampstead campus opened in September 1996. In June 1996 MYP authorisation was achieved and this was followed in June 2000 by PYP authorisation.

The Westminster campus opened in September 2003. In December 2006 the Milton Keynes based private company Cognita became the major shareholders and Southbank International School became the first in Cognita's international division. Cognita subsequently ran into serious criticism of its management of Southbank International School. Robert Booth of The Guardian wrote that in 2009 the school "was undergoing a period of turmoil" and a vocal parental group being established to seek remedy from the school's owner Cognita in 2011. The group made complaints that Cognita had "no serious interest in maximising the educational experience of ... children if it impacts on their bottom line". The group were not satisfied with the group's claims that profits were in line with others in the sector.

Cognita provided funding to open an IB Diploma Programme Centre on Conway Street for Grades 11 and 12 and this operates as an annexe to the main campus on Portland Place. The Conway Street building opened in August 2007 and students from the Middle School in Hampstead (grades 6, 7 and 8) joined the Westminster campus. Hampstead then became a two class entry Primary School for 2 to 11-year olds.

In August 2012 Cognita acquired the Charteris Sports Centre in London as a facility for Southbank International School which is let out to the community in non-school time.

In 2013, students from the school performed at the United States Academic Decathlon. Southbank's Grade 10-11 team came in ninth with a national Silver in Interview and two scholarships for academic excellence, whilst the Grade 6-9 team came in fifth and were awarded with ten national medals. In the same year, the school launched an IB Diploma Scholarship that covers 100% of tuition fees over two years.

In March 2014, William Vahey, a teacher who had worked at the school for several years, was found dead. He had been jailed for child sex offences in California in 1969 and it is thought he had abused over 50 students at Southbank.

Southbank International School was later praised by the Educational Collaborative for International Schools (of which it is a member) for the transformation of safeguarding practices and processes in the school which were deemed as "comprehensive and robust".

In 2017, the school announced further expansion plans of their Westminster campus on Cleveland Street. The new campus opened in September 2018 and offers five floors of relatively open plan space. "Brutal reforms" were also put on place which by 2017 saw the replacement of 30 headteachers across Cognita's organisation.

The 2018 Diploma Class achieved the highest results in the history of the school. IB Results: 3 students scored the maximum 45 out of 45 points (reached by only approximately 0.39% of the 2018 Diploma candidates); The average diploma score was 37.7; The world average is just over 29.8; 37% of students scored 40 points or higher (reached by only approximately 4.54% of candidates awarded the Diploma worldwide); 35% of students achieved a Bi-lingual diploma; The pass rate for the Diploma was 100% (Worldwide the pass rate in May 2018 was 78.2%). More recent IB Diploma results from the school can be found on here:

== Controversy ==
William Vahey was a teacher who drugged and molested at least 54 students at Southbank alone. Southbank failed to do a proper background check made difficult by Vahey not submitting to the sex offender registry for similar crimes in his twenties. His crimes came to light when a maid stole a flash drive depicting images of the abuse. He later committed suicide.

== School demographics ==
As of 2020 it had in total over 800 students in all of its campuses. As of 2020 it had over 470 students from 70 countries taking classes at the Westminster campus.

Its students come from families that are generally very wealthy. Robert Booth of The Guardian wrote that a parent told him that the school "gave you a different understanding of wealth" and that a lawyer's family would be considered poor there; students included those from families of foreign affairs officials, hedge fund managers, managers of oil companies, and a manager of a football club.

== Notable alumni ==
- Benjamin Wegg-Prosser, consultant and political adviser

== See also ==
- International Baccalaureate Organization
- IB Primary Years Programme
- IB Middle Years Programme
- IB Diploma Programme
