= Independent Schools Inspectorate =

Educational organisation in England inspecting private schools

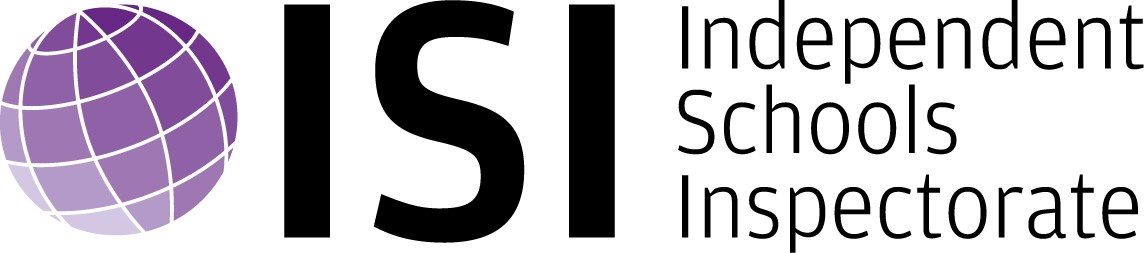
- Abbreviation: ISI
- Type: Non-for-profit
- Headquarters: London
- Region served: England
- Chief Inspector: Vanessa Ward
- Website: www.isi.net

The Independent Schools Inspectorate (ISI) is approved by the Secretary of State for Education – under section 106 of the Education and Skills Act 2008 – to inspect private schools in England. These schools are members of associations, which form the Independent Schools Council.

== Role and remit ==
ISI is a not-for-profit company limited by guarantee, with a board of independent directors. As required by law, ISI is independent of the schools it inspects and accountable to the Department for Education.

In November 2020, Vanessa Ward was appointed as Chief Inspector and CEO of ISI, following endorsement by the Secretary of State for Education, on the recommendation of the ISI board. She previously led inspections in the state and independent sectors as one of Her Majesty's Inspectors for Ofsted.

ISI inspects more than 1,200 schools, which together educate around 500,000 children each year. ISI reports to the Department for Education on the extent to which these schools meet The Education (Independent School Standards) Regulations 2014, and on the quality of education provided. Most independent schools which are not members of the ISC are inspected by Ofsted.

The inspectorate also conducts Educational Oversight inspections of private further education colleges and English language schools in England and Wales on behalf of the Home Office. These inspections provide reports on the quality of education in organisations holding a Tier 4 licence to sponsor international students under the Points Based System.

ISI is one of the approved inspectorates for overseas schools teaching a British curriculum, under the UK government's voluntary British Schools Overseas accreditation scheme.

== Governance ==
ISI has an independent board of directors, which holds the senior management team to account for the delivery and quality of inspections. ISI's board is independent from the Independent Schools Council, their associations and the schools that ISI inspects.

The board is chaired by Christine Swabey and currently comprises nine directors who were appointed for their experience and skills. The board adheres to the Nolan Principles of Public Life and ISI's own Code of Conduct.

=== Chief Inspectors ===
The head of the service is known as the Chief Inspector.

- 2005–2017: Christine Ryan
- 2017–2021: Kate Richards.
- 2021–present: Vanessa Ward

== Nature of an ISI inspection ==
ISI inspects schools regularly, with two routine inspections over each six-year inspection cycle. ISI also undertakes non-routine inspections when a school requests a material change; to follow up on previously unmet standards; or at the request of the Department for Education.

ISI undertakes two different types of routine inspection: regulatory compliance only; and inspection of educational quality with focused compliance.

Both inspections report against ‘the Standards’, which incorporate statutory and departmental guidance relating to safeguarding. All reports are published on the ISI website.

The standards are split into eight main parts and cover all aspects of school life:

1. Quality of education provided
2. Spiritual, moral, social and cultural development of pupils
3. Welfare, health and safety of pupils
4. Suitability of staff, supply staff, and proprietors
5. Premises of and accommodation at schools
6. Provision of information
7. Manner in which complaints are handled
8. Quality of leadership in and management of schools

Where there is cause for concern the Department for Education may make an unannounced Additional Inspection, and a Monitoring Visit to report on previous findings.

In 2018/19, ISI found 14.3 per cent (77 out of 537 inspections) of schools to be non-compliant with ‘the Standards’. Of the unmet standards reported by ISI to the Department for Education, 95 per cent related to standards of welfare, health and safety (which encompasses safeguarding).

ISI intended to introduce a new inspection framework at the start of the inspection cycle in September 2023.

== Effects of the COVID-19 pandemic ==
Routine inspections were suspended between March 2020 and September 2021 owing to the COVID-19 pandemic, and replaced by a limited number of remote reviews. During the suspension, the Department for Education retained the right to commission Material Change Visits, Additional Inspections and Progress Monitoring Visits.

== See also ==
- List of independent schools in the United Kingdom

Independent schools in other parts of the United Kingdom are inspected by the relevant national inspectorate:

- Northern Ireland: Education and Training Inspectorate
- Wales: Estyn
- Scotland: Education Scotland (formerly by Her Majesty's Inspectorate of Education)
