= National Day of Mourning (Canadian observance) =

Canadian holiday

- Observed by: Canada
- Celebrations: Flag at half-mast, Moment of silence, lighting candles, donning ribbons and black armbands
- Date: 28 April
- Next time: 28 April 2027
- Frequency: Annual
- Related to: Labor Day; Workers' Memorial Day

The National Day of Mourning, or Workers' Mourning Day is observed in Canada on 28 April. It commemorates workers who have been killed, injured or suffered illness due to workplace related hazards and occupational exposures.

Workers' Memorial Day was started when two labour activists, Colin Lambert and Ray Sentes, were driving in early April 1983 to a union meeting, and were stopped by a funeral procession for a firefighter who had been killed in the line of duty. They worried that other workers who died because of work did not receive similar honours, and recalled how members of the United Steelworkers in Elliot Lake held each year a "Workers' Remembrance Day" for uranium miners who had succumbed to exposures. Lambert and Sentes sought endorsements from union officials for the idea to hold a national day of mourning, and the Canadian Union of Public Employees (CUPE) passed a resolution to that effect at its annual convention in 1983, and the Canadian Labour Congress followed suit at its annual convention the following year. The AFL–CIO declared a day of mourning in 1989 and a "workers' Memorial Day" is observed in over 100 countries.

In December 1990, this day became a national observance in Canada with the passing of the Workers Mourning Day Act, so that on April 28, 1991, it was officially the National Day of Mourning for persons killed or injured in the workplace; making April 28, an official Workers' Mourning Day.

Injuries and deaths in the workplace continue to be a matter of important concern across Canada. Many Canadians members work hard each day in an effort to minimize accidents and incidents. Risk is an inherent element of many jobs, and this is why safety should be one of the core values in any workplace. Since its inception, the observance has spread to over 80 countries around the world, but is known is most other countries as the Workers' Memorial Day. The date 28 April was picked because on that day in 1914, the Workers Compensation Act received its third reading. In 2001 the International Labour Organization first observed World Day for Safety and Health at Work on this day. Commemorating those who have been hurt or killed in the workplace shows respect for the fallen, while serving as a reminder of the importance of occupational health and safety.

The Canadian flag is flown at half-mast from sunrise to sunset on all federal government buildings, including on Parliament Hill. Workers and employees observe this day in various ways including lighting candles, donning ribbons and black armbands, and observing a moment of silence at 1100 hrs. The purpose of Day of Mourning is twofold- to remember and honour those lives lost or injured and to renew the commitment to improving health and safety in the workplace - to prevent further deaths, injuries and diseases from work.

== Young Workers ==
Young workers aged from 15 to 24 are more likely than any other group to be injured on the job, in fact 1/3 of all injuries occur in this age group, and males are twice as likely to be injured as female workers. The highest rate of injury happens in construction and hospitality industries. These rates have led to specific laws in many provinces that provide for additional and special training for young and new workers. Due to these statistics, there has been renewed push to use this holiday to educate young workers of their rights in schools.

== Canadian monuments ==
Major monuments in Canada have been erected and dedicated to workers whose lives have been who have been killed and injured on the job.

- The Canadian Young Workers Memorial Quilt -The LifeQuilt with individual, personalized quilted blocks commemorated 100 young workers is a memorial dedicated to the thousands of young women and men between the ages of 14 and 24 killed on the job.
- Canadian Labour Congress Monument, Vincent Massey Park, Ottawa, Ontario, Canada - This monument was dedicated on April 28, 1987, one year after the Canadian Labour Congress had officially established April 28 as the Day of Mourning to workers killed and injured on the job.
- Falconbridge Mural, Sudbury, Ontario, Canada
- Milestones of Labour, Brampton, Ontario, Canada. Sculpture by Rob Moir and Sally Lawrence
- Miner's Memorial Kirkland Lake, Ontario, Canada. Sculpture by Rob Moir and Sally Lawrence
- Rideau Canal Fabric Mural Memorial, Kingston, Ontario, Canada
- Fire Fighter's Monument, Saskatoon, Saskatchewan, Canada
- "Breaking Ground" Hoggs Hollow Memorial, Toronto, Ontario, Canada
- 'Their Light Shall Always Shine' Memorial Park, New Glasgow, Nova Scotia is a park and memorial dedicated to the 26 miners who lost their lives in a horrific mining explosion on May 9, 1992. http://ns1763.ca/pictouco/westraymem.html
- "Broken Families Obelisk" Grant Notley Park, Edmonton, Alberta, Canada
- Welland Canal Fallen Workers Memorial, St. Catharines, Ontario, Canada

The BC Labour Heritage Centre maintains an interactive map recording all monuments and plaques dedicated to working-class people in British Columbia, over fifty sites of which are Day of Mourning specific.

== International monuments ==
Monuments around the world have been erected and dedicated to workers whose lives have been who have been killed and injured on the job.

- Hoover Dam Monument, Boulder City, Nevada, US
- Airplane and Fishermen Monument, Hedinsfjordur, Iceland
- Workers Memorial Day Stained Glass Window, Birmingham, England
- Deceased Workers Memorial Forest [Adelaide South Australia]
- National Deceased Workers Memorial (Workers Glade) [Canberra Australia]
- The Workers Memorial [St Helens, England]

== See also ==
- Labor Day
- Workers' Memorial Day
