= International School Zurich North =

International School Zurich North (ISZN)
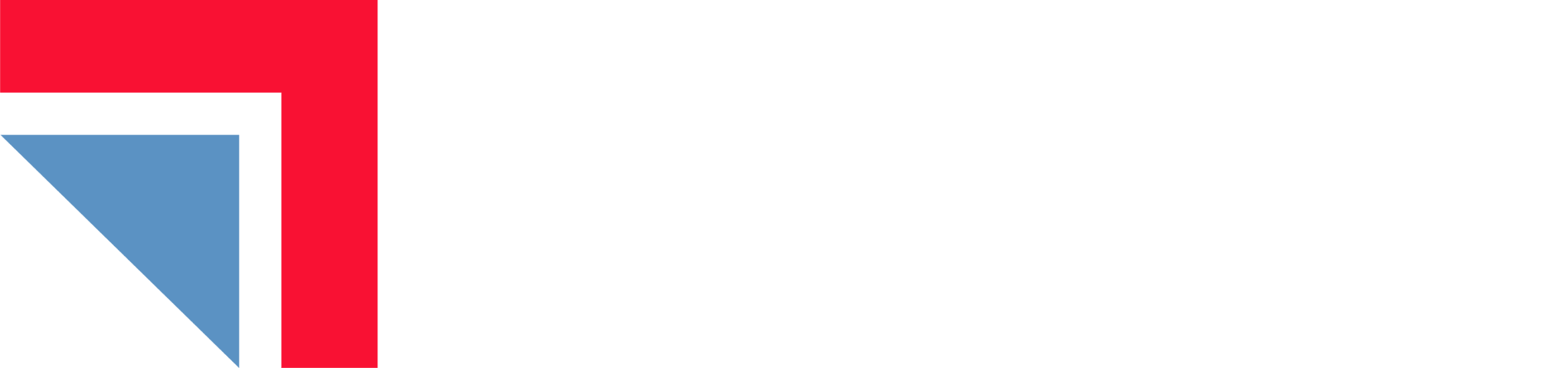

Location
- Wallisellen in Zürich; Switzerland
- Coordinates: 47°24′34″N 8°35′37″E

Information
- Established: 1999
- Owner: Cognita
- Faculty: 40
- Age: 3 months to 18 years
- Enrolment: ca 245
- Education system: A-level, IB Primary Years Programme, IGCSE Advanced Level (United Kingdom)
- Accreditation: Zurich: Primary School, Secondary School Programme, Grade 6 to 8 International: University of Cambridge
- Affiliations: Swiss Group of International Schools, Edexcel, International General Certificate of Secondary Education
- Website: www.iszn.ch

International School – Zurich North (ISZN) is an international private school for students aged 3 months to 18 years, located in the north-eastern suburbs of Zurich, Switzerland.The school community consists of over 240 students from approx. 35 different countries.

ISZN was acquired by Cognita on 21 June 2019.

Grades 9 and 10 follow a 2-year programme leading to the International General Certificate of Secondary Education (IGCSE) by Cambridge International Examinations (CIE) and Grades 11 and 12 sit the A-Level Examinations from Pearson Edexcel or Cambridge International Examinations. Both CIE and Edexcel qualifications are recognized by many universities around the world.

== Accreditation ==
=== By Swiss authorities ===
ISZN's Kindergarten and primary education programs (Primary Years Programme, Grade 1 to 5) are approved by the bureau for elementary school (Volksschulamt), administration for education (Bildungsdirektion), canton of Zurich.

Also ISZN's secondary education program (Secondary School Programme, Grade 6 to 9) is approved by the bureau for elementary school (Volksschulamt), administration for education (Bildungsdirektion), canton of Zurich as Sekundarstufe.

However ISZN's upper secondary education programs (Middle School Programme, grades 9 to 10, High School Programme, grades 11 to 12) are neither approved as a Mittelschule by the bureau for gymnasial and vocational education (Mittelschul- und Berufsbildungsamt), administration of education (Bildungsdirektion), Canton of Zurich, nor approved by the Swiss Federal State Secretariat for Education, Research and Innovation (SERI).

=== By international authorities ===
ISZN is also a recognized and authorized examinations center for Cambridge International Exams and Pearson Edexcel.

As of May 19, 2025, ISZN has achieved official Council of International Schools (CIS) accreditation, reflecting its dedication to global standards in international education.

A comprehensive list of CIS member schools can be found on the CIS membership directory.

=== Affiliations ===
ISZN is a member of the Swiss Group of International Schools (SGIS), a non-profit association established in 1969 that fosters collaboration, professional development, and student activities across its member international schools in Switzerland.

== Campuses and Facilities ==
The ISZN campus in Wallisellen houses all school levels, from nursery through A-Levels.

Facilities include Early Years and Primary classrooms, science laboratories, sports halls and fields, and dedicated spaces for art, drama, and music. Its location near Wallisellen and Oerlikon train stations provides access to central Zurich.

Students are also offered weekly access to a local gymnasium and a swimming pool, and make use of a number of other local facilities, sports grounds and ice skating rinks.
