= International School Yangon =

The International School Yangon (ISY)
- အပြည်ပြည်ဆိုင်ရာကလေးများကျောင်း၊ ရန်ကုန်မြို့

Location
- 20 Shwe Taungyar Road; Bahan Township; Yangon, Myanmar, Yangon Region; Myanmar; 16.8132094°N 96.152517°E

Information
- Type: International School
- Established: 1955
- Director: Mr. Mike Simpson
- Staff: 50+ Teachers
- Grades: K-12
- Enrollment: 450+
- Classes offered: American Curriculum with IB Diploma Program
- Colors: Gold; Black; White
- Athletics conference: South East Asia Student Activities Conference (SEASAC)
- Mascot: Chinthe
- Website: International School Yangon

The International School Yangon (ISY; Burmese: အပြည်ပြည်ဆိုင်ရာကလေးများကျောင်း၊ ရန်ကုန်မြို့) is a private, co-educational day school in Yangon, Myanmar. It offers an international education from early childhood (Chinthe Cubs, for children aged 3 and 4) through Grade 12, serving students of various nationalities.

The school was established in 1955 and follows a U.S. based elementary and middle school curricula and a high school curriculum shaped by the adoption of the International Baccalaureate (IB) Program.

The ISY operates as a nonprofit school under foreign ownership in Myanmar (Burma).

== Organisation ==
The ISY operates as a nonprofit association governed by a volunteer Board of Trustees, consisting of up to eleven members. All parents and legal guardians of currently enrolled students are automatically members of the association.

Members of the board are either elected or appointed, with elections typically held during the school’s Annual General Meeting (AGM) in May. Following the election, the board internally selects a Chair, Vice-Chair, Treasurer, and Secretary from among its members.

== Curriculum ==
The ISY has U.S.-based elementary and middle school curricula and a high school curriculum shaped by the International Baccalaureate (IB) Program. The language of instruction is English with Mandarin, French, Spanish, and Burmese taught as additional languages. The assessment program includes Measures of Academic Progress (MAP), International School Assessment (ISA), and the Preliminary Scholastic Aptitude Test (PSAT) in addition to the broad spectrum of IB exams in grades 11 and 12. ISY is fully accredited by the Western Association of Schools and Colleges (WASC), authorized by the International Baccalaureate Organization (IBO), and a member of the East Asia Regional Council of Schools (EARCOS).

== Demographics ==
There are 25 different nationalities of students represented at the school. There is a nationality cap that limits the number of students from any single nationality in order to maintain a diverse and international student population.

== Campus and facilities ==
The ISY is based at a 4-acre campus in the Golden Valley residential area of Yangon. The campus comprises five main buildings and includes academic, recreational, and community spaces.

Educational facilities include two libraries, music rooms, science laboratories, a dedicated elementary art room, and a secondary school visual arts space that features pottery equipment. The campus also contains a makerspace and two playgrounds.

The Science, Arts, and Sports (SAS) building houses a gymnasium with two courts, a fitness room, and a climbing wall. Additional athletic facilities include a covered swimming pool with timing touch pads, a playing field, and an open-air, covered basketball and volleyball court.

== Sports ==
ISY is a member of SEASAC, which consists of 16 international schools from Hong Kong, Thailand, Singapore, Malaysia, Vietnam, Myanmar and Indonesia. ISY hosted SEASAC golf and SEASAC girls softball in November and March 2019 respectively. ISY also competes with a range of international schools in Yangon through the Yangon Athletic Conference (YAC) and the Yangon Citywide Invitational (YCI).

In addition to SEASAC, ISY competes with other international schools in Yangon through the Yangon Athletic Conference (YAC) and the Yangon Citywide Invitational (YCI).
