= Villamartin =

- Location in the Province of Alicante Location in the Valencian Community Location in Spain
- Coordinates: 37.9416278°N 0.7567373°W
- Country: Spain
- Autonomous community: Valencian Community
- Province: Alicante
- Comarca: Vega Baja del Segura
- Judicial district: Orihuela
- Development: Villamartin
- Time zone: UTC+1 (CET)
  - Summer (DST): UTC+2 (CEST)
- Official language(s): Spanish

Villamartin is the name of both an urbanisation and a golf course in the Costa Blanca area of eastern Spain. It lies in the municipality of Orihuela, in the province of Alicante in the Valencian Community .

Villamartin is one of the many new developments in the past decade in this area of Costa Blanca. The area is very popular with tourists and most of the population consists of Western European expatriate communities who have settled there in the last 10 years, virtually transforming the village into a modern-looking town. There are also other golf courses nearby and numerous beaches. The nearest beach is La Zenia beach.

The area is home to El Limonar International School, Villamartin, an international school that teaches in both Spanish and English.

Villamartin is situated on the Costa Blanca in the municipality of Orihuela and the province of Alicante. It is one hours drive south of the Alicante airport and a twenty-minute drive north of the Murcia airport.

The construction of Villamartin started in 1972 and the area has now evolved into a cosmopolitan urbanisation, comprising some 1,500 apartments, villas and town houses. The main inhabitants are from western Europe and mostly English speaking. The Villamartin area is party to a lot of tourism, resulting in the appearance of numerous family-friendly attractions, from golf to water sports and go-cart tracks. The major attraction for both domestic and non-domestic tourism is the climate, as Villamartin has some 300 days of sunshine and a 20 degree average annual temperature, as well as the number of large beaches located in the area which were awarded the European Blue Flag for cleanliness, safety and the provision of facilities for the whole family.

Villamartin has two championship golf courses; Campo de Golf Villamartin, which was home to the 1994 Mediterranean Open, and Campo de Golf Las Ramblas. There are also a number of other courses in the near surrounding area.

The urbanisation of Villamartin is known for its central plaza located near to the Villamartin Golf Course. It consists of a bank, grocery store, doctor's office, a variety of bars, night clubs, cafés and restaurants, plus a number of apartments. The Plaza is built around a square that has a number of palm trees which are home to quite a few African Ring Neck Parrots. These parrots have achieved a celebrity status with the local tourists who are not used to the sight, and are seen as a pleasant addition to the area.
