= Chris Woodhead =

British educationalist

Sir Christopher Woodhead
- Woodhead in a BBC interview, May 1999

Her Majesty’s Chief Inspector of Education, Children’s Services and Skills
- In office 1994–2000
- Prime Minister: John Major; Tony Blair
- Minister: John Patten; Gillian Shephard; David Blunkett
- Preceded by: Stewart Sutherland
- Succeeded by: Sir Mike Tomlinson

Personal details
- Born: Christopher Anthony Woodhead; 20 October 1946 Southgate, Middlesex, England
- Died: 23 June 2015 (aged 68) London, England
- Spouses: Cathy Greenaway (m. 1969; div. 1976); Christine Kensett (m. 2006)
- Domestic partner: Amanda Johnston (c. 1970s–1980s)
- Children: 1
- Education: University of Bristol; Keele University

Sir Christopher Anthony Woodhead (20 October 1946 – 23 June 2015) was a British educationalist. He was Her Majesty's Chief Inspector of Schools in England from 1994 to 2000, and was one of the most controversial figures in debates on the direction of English education policy. He was Chairman of Cognita, a company dedicated to fostering private education, from 2004 to 2013.

== Early life ==
Christopher Anthony Woodhead was born in Southgate, Middlesex, on 20 October 1946. His father was an accountant, and his mother a school secretary; he was an only child. He went to Selsdon Primary School on Addington Road in South Croydon, then Wallington County Grammar School in Surrey. Later, he graduated in English at the University of Bristol, where he obtained a PGCE.

== Early career ==
Woodhead briefly worked as an English teacher at Wallington County Grammar School for Boys. Subsequently, he taught at Priory School for Boys in Shrewsbury from 1969 to 1972, moving to Newent Community School from 1972 to 1974 as assistant Head of English. He obtained a MA in English from Keele University in 1974. His final teaching position was at Gordano School in Portishead as Head of English. During this period, he was noted for his espousal of progressive educational methodology, which he later recanted.

In 1976, he left teaching, and subsequently moved into teacher education. He worked as a tutor on the Postgraduate Certificate of Education (PGCE) teacher training course at the University of Oxford and held a number of posts in education development, including Deputy Chief Education Officer in Devon (1988–90), as well as posts in Shropshire and Cornwall (1990–1). From 1991 to 1993 he was chief executive of the National Curriculum Council, and also of the SCAA from 1993 to 1994 (the School Curriculum and Assessment Authority later replaced by the Qualifications and Curriculum Authority) which replaced the National Curriculum Council and the School Examinations and Assessment Council from 1 October 1993.

== Ofsted ==
Woodhead was appointed head of the Office for Standards in Education (Ofsted), the schools inspection service, in 1994.

By this time, Woodhead advocated traditional teaching methods and took a scornful view of progressive educational theories introduced into English schools from the 1960s onwards. Supporters claimed that Woodhead was a radical reformer willing to tackle the failings of the education system and only encountering the defensiveness of the educational establishment. Critics argued that he was generating poor morale, rarely identified successes in schools, and that the "progressive teaching" he attacked was a straw man, with little resemblance to actual classroom practices. Woodhead most prominently identified weaknesses in schools with poor teaching and repeatedly asserted this view. Amongst his controversial remarks he claimed there were "15,000 incompetent teachers" and "I am paid to challenge mediocrity, failure and complacency". His blunt approach gained him many enemies, especially in the teaching profession.

When the Labour government came to power in 1997 there was much political pressure to replace Woodhead, either immediately or when his initial term expired in 1998, but instead he was retained and his appointment renewed by Education Secretary David Blunkett.

=== Resignation ===
On 2 November 2000 Woodhead announced his resignation.

In February 2005, The Guardian obtained information using the Freedom of Information Act, which confirmed that in 1997 Woodhead had over-ruled a unanimous decision by his own inspectors, and a subsequent inspection visit by HMI inspectors, to declare that Islington Green School was failing and required special measures. According to the head of the school at the time, "the consequences for staff and pupils were catastrophic".

== Later career ==
He was employed as a columnist for The Daily Telegraph and The Sunday Times newspapers. Subsequently, he stated that he felt the school-inspection system was now in a strong position and that he "felt unable to defend some aspects of government policy". In 2002 Class War: The State of British Education, a damning verdict on the systemic failures of British education, was published. Shortly thereafter, he was appointed a Professor of Education at the University of Buckingham. He continued to speak out in public on many issues relating to education at both school and university level, often provoking great controversy.

In 2004 Woodhead became chairman of Cognita, a company that owns and runs independent schools. Woodhead and Cognita were reported in the press as having expelled pupils, and were accused of "milking profits", and dismissing a whistleblower who accused the company of allowing ineligible teachers to participate in the state run Teachers' Pension Scheme.

In May 2009 his second book, A Desolation of Learning: Is this the education our children deserve?, a critical examination of the almost two decades of education policy and reforming initiative, was published.

He was on the Advisory Council of think tank Reform.

== Personal life and controversy ==
Woodhead met his wife, Cathy (née Greenaway), at Bristol, married in 1969 and had a daughter in 1975, his only child. Shortly afterwards he left home and they divorced in September 1976.

Later, Woodhead lived with Amanda Johnston, a former pupil of Gordano School, for nine years. They insisted that their relationship had begun after they had left the school but his former wife disputed this version of events and stated that she had been asked to consider a ménage à trois with Johnson when the latter was just 17, a claim in which she was supported by a number of Woodhead's colleagues at Gordano and Tony Robinson, who knew the Woodheads in Bristol.

He was previously in a relationship with Ruth Miskin.

In 1999, he was heavily criticised for saying pupil–teacher relationships could be 'experiential and educative on both sides'; he later said he thought his remarks had been off the record.

Cognita became embroiled in a sexual abuse scandal when it emerged that one of its teachers, William Vahey, at its Southbank International School had systematically sexually abused at least 60 pupils at the school over a period of years. Vahey taught at the school from 2009 to 2013. Woodhead was the chairman of the school board. Hugh Davies QC, who was appointed to look into the scandal stated that at the school, "The structures of governance did not deliver effective supervision of those with operational responsibility for child protection," and that child protection policies were not "fully understood and/or implemented" and there was a lack of training among the school's child protection officers.

He married again in 2006, to Christine Kensett, and lived in Herefordshire. Woodhead was knighted in the 2011 Birthday Honours for services to education.

Woodhead enjoyed running and rock climbing until he was diagnosed with the neurodegenerative condition motor neurone disease in 2006. In an interview with The Sunday Times published on 3 May 2009, he stated publicly that he would prefer to end his own life than suffer the indignities of the final stages of the disease; in an interview he stated, "The truth is that I would be more likely to drive myself in a wheel-chair off a cliff in Cornwall than go to Dignitas and speak to a bearded social worker about my future."

Woodhead was a patron of Dignity in Dying and campaigned for an assisted dying law: "The problem with MND is that it just gets worse, which means everything becomes a matter of timing. If I knew that the choice of an assisted death at home was a reality it would bring me great comfort and happiness." Woodhead died in London on 23 June 2015, at the age of 68.

== See also ==
- Assisted suicide
- Right to die
- Euthanasia

Preceded by Stewart Sutherland	Chief Inspector at Ofsted; 1994–2000	Succeeded by Sir Mike Tomlinson
