= Hazards Campaign =

The Hazards Campaign is a UK network established in 1988 to campaign for improved workplace health, safety and welfare, and a reduction in the incidence of work-related injury, ill-health and death. It brings together Hazards Centres, Occupational Health Projects, trade unions, health and safety groups, specific campaigns and individual health and safety activists. Specific campaign groups include the Construction Safety Campaign, the Centre for Corporate Accountability (CCA), the UK WorkStress Network, Families Against Corporate Killers (FACK), asbestos victims' support groups, and RSI Action.

The campaign works by: sharing information and skills; campaigning on specific issues; acting as a national voice; issuing press releases; holding conferences; establishing national initiatives, including Workers Memorial Day; lobbying MPs, MEPs and statutory bodies like the Health & Safety Commission and the Health & Safety Executive, and organising demonstrations and protests.

The Campaign is a worker-oriented organisation, and promotes trade union organisation in workplaces, increased worker involvement and participation in decision-making, and a radial perspective on the issues. It currently (2006) promotes and supports a number of emerging safety representative networks in different parts of the UK. It meets about four or five times a year; these meetings are open to anyone sharing the aims of the campaign. Its highest profile event is the annual Hazards Conference, the largest regular rank-and-file event in Europe, which attracts around 600 delegates every year.
