= Christine Gilbert =

English schoolteacher

Dame Christine Gilbert McNulty DBE (née McGinty) is an English schoolteacher who was the Head of Ofsted (HMCI) also known as Her Majesty's Chief Inspector of Education, Children's Services and Skills between October 2006 and 30 June 2011.

== Early life and education ==
Gilbert was born Christine McGinty into a Catholic working-class family and went to a convent school in London. She studied at the University of Reading where she obtained a Bachelor of Arts degree (BA) in English and History. She furthermore received a Master of Education degree (MEd) and a Postgraduate Certificate in Education (PGCE).

== Career ==
Gilbert trained as a history teacher. She said, "I couldn't get over the fact that there were children of 14 or 15 in front of me who couldn't read," so took an Open University reading diploma to learn what she should do. At the age of 32, she became head of Whitmore High School, and then promoted to Director of Education for the London Borough of Harrow.

She became Director of Education for the London Borough of Tower Hamlets in 1997 where she led the transformation in performance and quality of local schools. The percentage of students gaining General Certificate of Secondary Education or equivalent at good grades (A*-C) was raised to 56% from 26% in under a decade. Later she became Chief Executive of Tower Hamlets.

=== Ofsted ===
Gilbert became HM Chief Inspector on 1 October 2006, replacing Maurice Smith. One of her key briefs was to oversee the expansion of Ofsted's remit from April 2007 to include the inspection of children's social services, adult learning and aspects of court administration, as this relates to children.

Miriam Rosen, Gilbert's successor, wrote in The Annual Report of Her Majesty’s Chief Inspector of Education, Children's Services and Skills 2010/11, "In concluding this commentary, I want to take the opportunity to say a brief and personal word about Christine Gilbert, who finished her term as HMCI during the year. Christine brought the new Ofsted together from its predecessor organisations in 2007. She brought extraordinary energy and personal drive to the service of children and learners. She passionately believed not only that everyone deserves the best from the services they use, but that every child can and should achieve and do well. That has been the vision which has animated Ofsted for many years, and it continues to do so today."

=== Post Ofsted ===
Since Gilbert left Ofsted, she is a visiting professor at the UCL Institute of Education. She undertook a number of reviews including chairing the Academies Commission which published Unleashing Greatness: Getting the best from an academised system (2013).

On Monday 5 November 2012, Gilbert took up a post as Acting Chief Executive of the Council in the London Borough of Brent, initially for a six-month appointment, succeeding Gareth Daniel who left at short notice earlier in the year, but stayed for three years.

Since 2016, she has been the Chair of Future First, a charity that champions the establishment of a thriving alumni in every school so that young people can benefit from motivational role models. Currently, she is also Chair of Camden Learning, a school-led locality partnership that drives excellence and equity.

=== Chair Ofsted ===
In June 2025, Dame Christine Gilbert returned to Ofsted, as she was appointed chair of Ofsted.

== Education beliefs ==
When she went into education she initially taught the 'whole books' method and believed in it, but seeing the effects of the National Literacy Strategy, realised for those of school age the explicit teaching of phonics was important.

Gilbert is joint chair of the Area Education Partnerships Association (AEPA) and an advocate of local education partnerships.

== Personal life ==
Divorced from her first husband, she met then councillor and later government minister Tony McNulty when she was Director of Education for the London Borough of Harrow. The couple married in September 2002 in Hammersmith and Fulham. She has no children from either marriage.

Gilbert was appointed a Commander of the Order of the British Empire (CBE) in the 2006 New Year Honours for services to local government and to education, and promoted to Dame Commander of the same Order (DBE) in the 2022 Birthday Honours for services to young people and charity.

Preceded by Maurice Smith	Chief Inspector at Ofsted; 2006 - 2011	Succeeded by Sir Michael Wilshaw
