= Ofsted =

United Kingdom government department for educational standards

Office for Standards in Education, Children's Services and Skills

Agency overview
- Formed: 1992
- Type: Non-ministerial government department
- Jurisdiction: England
- Employees: 1,275
- Annual budget: £168 million (2013–14) & £130 million (2018–2019)
- Agency executives: Christine Gilbert, Chair; Sir Martyn Oliver, His Majesty's Chief Inspector
- Parent department: Department for Education
- Website: gov.uk/ofsted

- Applies to: England
- Relates to: Educational standards and inspections

Other UK counterparts
- Northern Ireland: Education and Training Inspectorate
- Scotland: His Majesty's Inspectorate of Education
- Wales: Estyn

The Office for Standards in Education, Children's Services and Skills (Ofsted) is a non-ministerial department of His Majesty's Government (HMG), reporting to Parliament. Ofsted's role is to make sure that organisations providing education, training and childcare services in England do so to a high standard for children and students. Ofsted is responsible for inspecting a range of educational institutions, including state schools and some independent schools. It also inspects childcare, adoption and fostering agencies and initial teacher training, and regulates early years childcare facilities and children's social care services.

The chief inspector ("HMCI") is appointed by an Order in Council and thus becomes an office holder under the Crown. Sir Martyn Oliver has been HMCI since 2024; since August 2020 the chair of Ofsted has been Christine Ryan: her predecessors include Julius Weinberg and David Hoare.

Ofsted publish reports on the quality of education and management at a particular school and organisation on a regular basis. His Majesty's Inspectors (HMI) rank schools based on information gathered in inspections which they undertake. An Ofsted section 5 inspection is called a 'full report' and administered under section 5 of the 2005 Education Act, while a monitoring visit is conducted under the authority given by section 8 of the 2005 Education Act and can also be called an Ofsted section 8 inspection.

== History ==
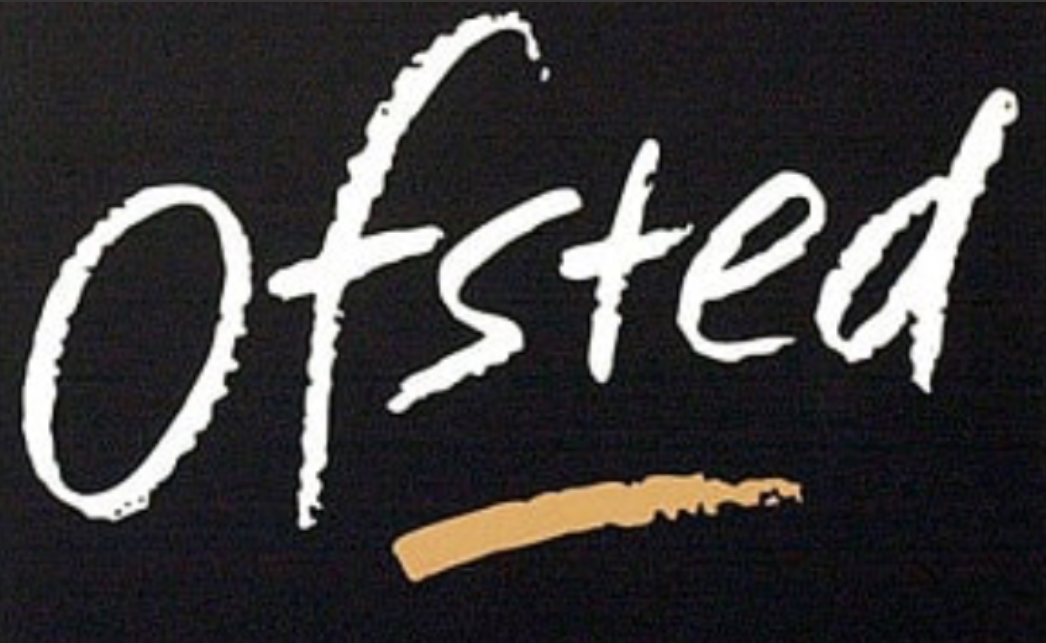
Original Ofsted logo from the 1990s

In 1833, Parliament agreed to an annual grant to the National Society for Promoting Religious Education and the British and Foreign School Society, which respectively provided Church of England and non-denominational elementary schools for poor children. In 1837, two inspectors of schools, Seymour Tremenheere and the Reverend John Allen, were appointed to monitor the effectiveness of the grant. James Kay-Shuttleworth, then Secretary of the Privy Council's Education Committee, ensured that the inspectors were appointed by Order in Council to guard their independence.

The grant and inspection system was extended in 1847 to Roman Catholic elementary schools established by the Catholic Poor School Committee. Inspectors were organised on denominational lines, with the churches having a say in the choice of inspectors, until 1876, when the inspectorate was reorganised by area.

After the Education Act 1902, inspections were expanded to state-funded secondary schools along similar lines. Over time more inspections were carried out by inspectors based in local education authorities, with His Majesty's Inspectorate (HMI) focusing on reporting to the Secretary of State on education across the country.

The government of John Major, concerned about variable local inspection regimes, decided to introduce a national scheme of inspections through a reconstituted HMI, which became known as the Office for Standards in Education (Ofsted). Under the Education (Schools) Act 1992, HMI would supervise the inspection of each state-funded school in the country, and would publish its reports for the benefit of schools, parents, and government instead of reporting to the Secretary of State.

In September 2001, HM Chief Inspector of Schools in England became responsible for registration and inspection of day care and childminding in England, and the position was renamed HM Chief Inspector of Education, Children's Services and Skills. Previously this was done by 150 local authorities, based on their implementation by 1992 of the Day care Standards provisions of the 1989 Children Act.

Schedule 11 of the Education and Inspections Act 2006 changed the way in which Ofsted works without significantly changing the provision. Since 2006 the structure of Ofsted has derived elements from business models, with a chair, an executive board, regional officers, and a formal annual report to Parliament in the light of concerns about schools, and local authority children's services. In April 2007, the former Office for Standards in Education merged with the Adult Learning Inspectorate to provide an inspection service that includes all post-16 government funded education (but not Higher Education Institutes and Universities which are inspected by the Quality Assurance Agency). At the same time it took on responsibility for the registration and inspection of social care services for children, and the welfare inspection of independent and maintained boarding schools from the Commission for Social Care Inspection.

== Current state ==
The services Ofsted inspects or regulates include local services, childminding, child day care, children's centres, children's social care, CAFCASS, state schools, private schools and teacher training providers, colleges, and learning and skills providers in England. It also monitors the work of the Independent Schools Inspectorate. HMI are empowered and required to provide independent advice to His Majesty's Government (HMG) and Parliament on matters of policy and to publish an annual report for Parliament on the quality of educational provision in England. Ofsted distributes its functions amongst its offices in London, Manchester, Nottingham, Birmingham, Cambridge, York, Darlington and Bristol.

Ofsted covers only England; the Education and Training Inspectorate in Northern Ireland, HM Inspectorate of Education in Scotland, and Estyn in Wales perform similar functions within their education systems.

A new Education Inspection Framework (EIF) introduced from September 2019 sets out how Ofsted undertakes inspections under section 5 of the Education Act 2005 (as amended), section 109 of the Education and Skills Act 2008, the Education and Inspections Act 2006 and the Childcare Act 2006.

== Inspectors ==
The current Chief Inspector is Sir Martyn Oliver, who was appointed in January 2024 replacing Amanda Spielman. Ofsted directly employs His Majesty's Inspectors (HMI), who are appointed by the King in Council. As of July 2009, there were 443 HMIs, of whom 82 were engaged in management, 245 in the inspection of schools, and the rest in the inspection of other areas for which Ofsted in responsible. All HMIs inspecting schools have teaching experience.

When Ofsted was created the original plan was that inspectors would not be drawn from education. the plan was to give parents an independent review of a school untainted by the education establishment. This plan was quickly replaced by a system that existed until 2005. This system was based on schools being inspected by teams containing three types of inspector. Each team was led by a 'registered' inspector. They were accompanied by a number of 'team' inspectors, the number of which depended on the size of the school. Each team also contained 'lay' inspector recruited from outside the world of education. In September 2005 the distinction between registered, team and lay inspectors was removed and all contracted inspectors (as opposed to directly employed HMI) became 'Ofsted inspectors'.

Most school inspections were carried out by additional Inspectors (AI) employed by external companies known as Regional Inspection Service Providers (RISPs). As of July 2009, there were 1,948 AIs, of whom 1,567 inspect schools. Although Ofsted claims that most of these have teaching experience, in 2012 it was forced to admit that it had done no quality control checks on these inspectors, and that a few of them – including lead inspectors – were not qualified teachers as prior to 2005 they had been 'lay' inspectors. In 2015, the chief inspector (Sir Michael Wilshall) decided that he wanted more direct control over Ofsted inspectors brought responsibility for their training, deployment and quality 'in-house' and abolished the contracts with the RISPs who are no more. 40% of additional inspectors who wanted to continue working for Ofsted were not re-hired after the contractual change. Although Ofsted insisted that this was part of a quality control process and "should not be seen as an admission that its inspections were substandard", serving headteacher and Times Educational Supplement columnist Geoff Barton commented "dispensing with almost 40 per cent of inspectors on the grounds of quality is hardly an endorsement of standards."

An HMI accompanies an Ofsted inspector on a sample of inspections, including 75% of those of secondary schools. Reports produced by RISPs must be checked and signed off by HMI, sometimes with amendments, before publication. New Additional Inspectors must be monitored and signed off by HMI before working independently.

The number of RISPs contracted to conduct school inspections was reduced in 2009 from five to three:

- CfBT Education Trust, covering the North of England
- Serco Education and Children's Services, covering the English Midlands
- Tribal Group, covering the South of England

As of January 2021, seventy per-cent of the inspectors are now headteachers or school leaders.

== School inspections ==
Ofsted publish reports on the quality of education and management at a particular school and organisation on a regular basis. His Majesty's Inspectors (HMI) rank schools based on information gathered in inspections which they undertake. Inspectors carry out regular inspections of all maintained schools and academies, some independent schools, colleges, apprenticeship providers, prison education and many other educational institutions and programmes outside of higher education. Ofsted aims to improve lives by raising standards in education and children's social care. Ofsted monitors standards in schools, and tells schools what they are doing right and what they must do to improve.

Inspectors publish reports of findings so they can be used to improve the overall quality of education and training. Inspection reports provides important information to parents, carers, learners and employers about the quality of education, training and care. These groups should be able to make informed choices based on the information published in inspection reports. Ofsted monitors standards in schools, and tells schools what they are doing right and what they must do to improve. Before 2005 each school was inspected for a week every six years, with two months' notice to prepare for an inspection.

=== 2005–2012 ===
In September 2005 a new system of short-notice inspections came into being. Under this system the senior leadership of each school were strongly encouraged to complete a Self Evaluation Form (SEF) on a continual basis, which required them to be aware of strengths and areas for development. Inspections were generally two- or three-day visits every three years, with two days' notice. They focused on the "central nervous system" of the school – examining how well the school was managed, and what processes were in place to ensure standards improve; the school leadership and management were expected to be aware of everything in the SEF. The SEF served as the main document when planning the inspection, and was crucial in evaluating the school's capacity to improve.

After an inspection of a school, Ofsted published a report on the school on its website. In addition to written comments on a number of areas, schools were assessed on each area and overall on a 4-point scale: 1 (Outstanding), 2 (Good), 3 (Satisfactory) and 4 (Inadequate). Schools rated Outstanding or Good might not be inspected again for five years, while schools judged less favourably were inspected more frequently, and might receive little or no notice of inspection visits. Figures published in March 2010 showed that revised inspection criteria, which were introduced in September 2009, resulted in a reduction from 19% to 9% in the number of schools judged to be Outstanding, and an increase from 4% to 10% in the number of schools judged to be Inadequate.

=== 2012–2015 ===
==== Section 5 ====
A framework for section 5 inspections of academies and maintained schools was introduced from January 2012, and replaced with another new framework in September 2012. Public consultation was undertaken, and Ofsted prepared for the new framework after piloting a series of inspections across the country. Among other changes, the new system relabelled the "Satisfactory" category as "Requires Improvement", with an expectation that schools should not remain at that level.

=== 2015–2020 ===
In 2015 they published a Common Inspection Framework, and four handbooks which gave much of the details of inspections. These are no longer/not statutory documents so can be changed regularly. The four handbooks are:

- Maintained schools and academies
- Early years
- Non-association independent schools
- Further education and skills

A new Education Inspection Framework (EIF) introduced from September 2019 sets out how Ofsted undertakes inspections under section 5 of the Education Act 2005 (as amended), section 109 of the Education and Skills Act 2008, the Education and Inspections Act 2006 and the Childcare Act 2006.

A Section 5 is also known as a full inspection; a section 8 is also called a monitoring visit. When the inspectors find serious causes for concern, they may extend the section 8 so it becomes a section 5 with the additional legal powers. Similarly, when using a Section 8 to confirm a Good School's continual status, they may extend the inspection by one day so converting it into a Section 5 in order to grade the school outstanding.

==== Section 8 ====
Section 8 of the Education Act 2005 (as amended) gives the Secretary of State the legal authority to request His Majesty's Chief Inspector (HMCI) to enter a school for the purpose of obtaining information. Section 8 Inspections cannot change a schools allocated designation but can trigger a Section 5 Inspection where that might happen.

They are used in three ways:

- to monitor the progress a school rated as level 4 (Inadequate) has made in following the advice they had been given
- to inspect school rated as level 1 (Outstanding) and thus exempt from Section 5 Inspection, when information has been received that caused concern
- to enter a school or groups of schools to gather information for the Secretary of State on current issues that maybe needed for a report.

=== Format of a 2018 report ===
- Address and inspection dates
- Overall effectiveness: a grade
- Effectiveness of leadership and management: a grade
- Quality of teaching, learning and assessment: a grade
- Personal development, behaviour and welfare: a grade
- Outcomes for pupils: a grade
- Early years provision: if present a grade
- 16 to 19 study programmes: if present a grade
- Overall effectiveness at previous inspection: a single grade

This is followed by :

- 'Summary of key findings for parents and pupils'
- 'What does the school need to do to improve further?'

Inspection judgements form the body of the report. For each heading, eight or more critical paragraphs, at the inspectors discretion, are written that support the grade given.

- A single page giving a formal table of data held on the school on Government Databases.
- A free text description of the school.
- Details of the inspection team, and the scope of the inspection.

==== Emphasis in 2020 ====
The two principal strands that are being examined are the effectiveness of safeguarding of the students and the impact of governance and management. Inspectors make graded judgements on the following areas:

- Quality of education
- Behaviour and attitudes
- Personal development
- Leadership and management

=== Special measures ===
A school is placed into special measures if it is judged as 'inadequate' (Grade 4) in one or more areas and if the inspectors have decided it does not have the capacity to improve without additional help. Schools placed into special measures receive intensive support from local authorities, additional funding and resourcing, and frequent reappraisal from Ofsted until the school is no longer deemed to be failing. Furthermore, the senior managers and teaching staff can be dismissed and the governing body may be replaced by an appointed Interim Executive Board (IEB). Schools which are failing but where inspectors consider there is capacity to improve are given a Notice to Improve (NtI).

== Home educator inspections ==
Ofsted, as of April 2015, was issuing new guidance to inspectors which will include the following:

- Home-educated children are not, by definition, all in need of protection and help.
- The statutory duty on local authorities (LAs) to identify as far as possible those children not receiving a suitable education does not extend to home-educated children.
- The details, and limits, of the guidance in relation to home education

== Other inspections ==
In social care settings that include provision for children and young people, Ofsted has adopted a social care common inspection framework (SCCIF) which applies across all regulated settings.

Ofsted is one of the partner inspectorates contributing to joint targeted area inspections (JTAIs), along with the Care Quality Commission and HM Inspectorate of Constabulary and Fire and Rescue Services. There are two types of JTAI:

- those which undertake an evaluation of an area's multi-agency response to identification of initial need and risk (or the 'front door' of child protection), and
- those which focus on a particular theme or cohort of children within an area, such as (initially) an area's multi-agency response to the criminal exploitation of children.

== Criticisms ==
Ofsted was criticised as 'not fit for purpose' in 2007 by the House of Commons Education Select Committee. The committee also highlighted their concern about "the complex set of objectives and sectors that Ofsted now spans and its capacity to fulfil its core mission". Other criticism came from the Association of Teachers and Lecturers (ATL) which said "Ofsted is over-reliant on number crunching, using test data which are fundamentally unsound" and added that the organisation was "ripe for overhaul".

Over a period of several years the Select Committee had questioned the Chief Inspector over its treatment of Summerhill School and what it had learnt from the 1999 Court Case and subsequent inspections. In the Court Agreement between DfE and Summerhill School, Independent Schools Tribunal IST/59, inspections would include two advisors from the school and one from the DfE to ensure the fairness of the process. The school had campaigned for all schools to be similarly inspected, ensuring openness and accountability for the process.

In August 2013, 18 of the 24 newly launched Free Schools were graded Good or Outstanding by Ofsted; however, with over 100 state schools being downgraded from an Outstanding classification that year, the consistency of Ofsted grading was once again brought into question, leading to numerous 'How to get a Good Ofsted' guides being created.

A 2014 report by the think tank Policy Exchange indicated that many Ofsted inspectors lack the knowledge required to make fair judgements of lessons and that judgements are so unreliable, "you would be better off flipping a coin".

A 2014 poll of teachers, carried out by Teacher Support Network, revealed that over 90% of teachers felt Ofsted inspections had a neutral or negative impact on students' results. In response to criticisms about the increased workload inspection frameworks caused, Ofsted pledged it would not change its inspection framework during the school year. Wilshaw also dismissed speculation that Ofsted itself was responsible for teachers' heavy workload (in excess of 60 hours per week) describing it as 'a red herring'. However, a 2015 poll by the NUT found that 53% of teachers were planning to leave teaching by 2017, with the extra workload from Ofsted's 'accountability agenda' a key factor in seeking a job with a better work/life balance.

The Ofsted complaints procedure has also been heavily criticised for opacity and a strong bias in favour of the inspectors. Geoff Barton, after writing an article strongly critical of Ofsted's use of raw data rather than inspection reports to determine grades, noted that:

the Ofsted complaints procedure too often seems constructed around a deep and dutiful need for self-protection. Thus an inspection system that demands transparency from schools refuses to release its own inspection notes, When challenged, it dares us to resort to a Freedom of Information request and then rejects those same requests because they don't conform to a definition of "public interest".

In 2015, an inspector revealed that inspection judgements can be arbitrarily over-ruled by senior figures, commenting on a case where a school had been downgraded:

We couldn't understand this rationale at all. It turned out that Ofsted had made a brief visit to the school some time before the inspection and had come up with some sort of unreported provisional judgement. So all that evidence we had gathered meant nothing and essentially this team of experienced inspectors was not trusted to make a judgement.

Barton concluded his article, "the accounts above reveal an inspection system that appears in too many cases to be doing great damage. My sense is that it's time to stop quietly accepting that the way Ofsted is the way Ofsted should be." In response, Wilshaw attacked Barton for being "too quick to perpetuate a 'them against us' view of the schools inspectorate... we fall back on a 'clichéd defence-mechanism' of whingeing about inconsistency", and insisted that Ofsted was becoming "more rigorous and demanding". However, Barton argued the letter lost some of its force and all of its credibility for being published on the day 40% of inspectors were sacked for not being up to the job.

In 2019, Ofsted commissioned a survey on teachers' wellbeing. The Guardian reported that "Teachers said they spent less than half their time in the classroom, with the bulk of their hours spent on marking, planning and administration, including data entry and feedback required by school management to prepare for Ofsted inspections." Teachers worked a 50 to 57 hour week. Geoff Barton, the general secretary of the Association of School and College Leaders, said "Ofsted and the government are the source of much of the stress and anxiety on staff through an extremely high-pressure accountability system."

On 8 January 2023, Ruth Perry, head at Caversham Primary School in Reading, Berkshire, killed herself while waiting for the publication of a report that downgraded her school from outstanding to inadequate. Perry's family said she had described the previous November's inspection as the worst day of her life. The National Education Union, school leaders' union NAHT and the Association of School and College Leaders called for inspections to be halted, and a petition calling for an enquiry into the inspection received more than 230,000 signatures. HM Chief Inspector of Education, Children's Services and Skills (the head of Ofsted), Amanda Spielman, rejected the calls to halt Ofsted inspections. As a reaction to the news of Perry's death, heads at some schools have worn black armbands during inspections or removed references to Ofsted from their websites.

On 25 March 2023, research carried out by the Hazards Campaign and the University of Leeds as reported in The Observer, stated that "Stress caused by Ofsted inspections was cited in coroners' reports on the deaths of 10 teachers over the past 25 years". In 2015, headteacher Carol Woodward killed herself following an Ofsted inspection that downgraded her school to inadequate, and in 2013 headteacher Helen Mann hanged herself when Ofsted advised that her plans to transform the curriculum were not happening quickly enough and her school would lose its top level rating.

A second Ofsted report into Caversham Primary School, published in July 2023, rated the school as good. On 7 December 2023, senior coroner Heidi Connor said the inspection "lacked fairness, respect and sensitivity" and was at times "rude and intimidating", where the inquest ruled that the Ofsted inspection "likely contributed" to the death of head teacher Ruth Perry. Ms Connor said a prevention of future death notice will be issued and she "very much hopes" the results of the inquest will be used by the Education Select Committee's inquiry into Ofsted and how it works.

== In popular culture ==
Hope and Glory, a BBC television drama featuring actor/comedian Lenny Henry, gave an insight into a fictional portrayal of teachers dealing with a school in Special Measures. OFSTED! The Musical was launched in 2004 at the Edinburgh Festival Fringe. The piece enjoyed a total sell-out run at Venue 45 and won the Writers' Guild Award for Drama 2004 and the List Magazine Award. The musical was later broadcast on Teachers TV as part of their launch night schedule. Summerhill, a BBC TV drama, depicted the school being threatened with closure due to an inspection and winning a court case in 2000 against the DfE and its actions based on the inspection report.

== Senior people ==
=== His Majesty's Chief Inspector ===
His Majesty's Chief Inspector of Education, Children's Services and Skills (sometimes abbreviated to HMCI) is the head of Ofsted. Martyn Oliver was appointed His Majesty's Chief Inspector of Education, Children's Services and Skills from 2 January 2024.

The title of His Majesty's Chief Inspector of Schools (HMCI) was created at the same time as The Office for Standards in Education (Ofsted) itself. Before Ofsted was set up in 1992, the person heading its forerunner, HM Inspectorate of Schools, was known as the Senior Chief Inspector (SCI) and was also a Deputy Secretary in the Department of Education and Science.

- 1944–1957: SCI Martin Roseveare, later Sir Martin Roseveare
- 1965–1967: SCI Cyril English, later Sir Cyril English
- 1967–1972: SCI W. R. Elliott
- 1972–1974: SCI Harry W. French
- 1974–1983: SCI Sheila Browne
- 1983–1991: SCI Eric Bolton
- 1991–1992: SCI Terry Melia
- 1992–1994: HMCI Stewart Sutherland, later Baron Sutherland of Houndwood
- 1994–2000: Chris Woodhead, later Sir Chris Woodhead
- 2000–2002: Mike Tomlinson, later Sir Mike Tomlinson
- 2002–2006: David Bell, later Sir David Bell
- January–October 2006: Maurice Smith (acting)
- 2006–2011: Christine Gilbert
- July–December 2011: Miriam Rosen (acting)
- January 2012 – December 2016: Sir Michael Wilshaw
- January 2017 – January 2024: Amanda Spielman
- January 2024 – present: Martyn Oliver

=== Chair of Ofsted ===
Since 2006, the structure of Ofsted has included a board headed by a chair. The following have served as Chair of Ofsted:

- 2006–2010: Zenna Atkins
- 2011–2014: Sally Morgan, Baroness Morgan of Huyton
- 2014–2016: David Hoare
- 2016–2017: James Kempton (interim)
- 2017–2020: Julius Weinberg
- 2020–2025: Christine Ryan
- 2025-2025: Sir Mufti Hamid Patel (interim)
- 2025–present: Christine Gilbert

== See also ==
- Education in England
