= Examination boards in the United Kingdom =

Examination boards in the United Kingdom (sometimes called awarding bodies or awarding organisations) are the examination boards responsible for setting and awarding secondary education level qualifications, such as GCSEs, National 5s, A Levels, Highers and vocational qualifications, to students in the United Kingdom.

Until the mid-1990s, academic exam boards and vocational accreditors were run as separate organisations. In more recent times, this distinction has been removed, with the term 'awarding bodies' now being used. This article focuses on the contemporary and historical awarding bodies that set academic exams in state schools. In everyday terminology, these organisations are still referred to as 'exam boards'.

Broadly speaking, the UK has always had two separate school systems: one for England, Wales and Northern Ireland; and one for Scotland. As a result, two separate sets of exam boards have been developed.

== England, Wales and Northern Ireland ==
England, Wales and Northern Ireland have several exam boards; schools and colleges can choose freely between them on a subject-by-subject basis. Currently, there are five exam boards available to state schools:

- AQA (Assessment and Qualifications Alliance)
- CCEA (Council for the Curriculum, Examinations and Assessment)
- Cambridge OCR
- Pearson, under its Edexcel brand
- WJEC (Welsh Joint Education Committee), under its WJEC and Eduqas brands

Though the exam boards have regional roots (see below), they now operate across larger areas. The three boards based in England – AQA, Cambridge OCR and Edexcel – offer all their qualifications across England with a smaller number in Wales (where no 'homegrown' qualification is available) and Northern Ireland (where the qualifications meet the regulator's requirements). The Wales-based WJEC offers qualifications in Wales (mostly under its WJEC brand), England (nearly always under its Eduqas brand) and Northern Ireland (under either brand). CCEA, despite previously offering qualifications in England and Wales, now only operates in Northern Ireland. Most exam boards offer a range of qualifications, though not all boards offer every qualification in every subject.

Schools and colleges have a completely free choice between the boards, depending on the qualification offered. Most schools use a mixture of boards for their GCSE qualifications, with a similar mixture existing at A Level. In addition, a school using one board for a particular GCSE subject is free to use a different board for the equivalent subject at A Level.

=== History of the exam boards ===
==== Early beginnings ====
Exam boards have been around as long as there have been qualifications offered by schools. As universities had experience of offering qualifications, such as degrees, it was natural that they created the first exam boards. Indeed, the Universities of Oxford and Cambridge each had their own exam board and a joint board they ran together. The qualifications offered were generally of the boards' own creation. Schools and colleges (with some exceptions, detailed below) were free to pick which board they wanted to use, though most went for a local board.

The early boards established included:

- 1856: Society of Arts, the Society for the encouragement of Arts, Manufactures and Commerce, later the Royal Society for the encouragement of Arts, Manufactures and Commerce (Royal Society of Arts)
- 1857: University of Oxford Delegacy of Local Examinations (founded by the University of Oxford)
- 1858: University of Cambridge Local Examinations Syndicate (UCLES, founded by the University of Cambridge)
- 1858: University of Durham Matriculation and School Examination Board (founded by the University of Durham; closed 1964)
- 1873: Oxford and Cambridge Schools Examination Board (founded by the University of Oxford and the University of Cambridge)
- 1896: Central Welsh Board (founded by the Welsh local authorities)
- 1900: University of Birmingham
- 1902: University of London Extension Board (founded by the University of London)
- 1903: Joint Matriculation Board (JMB, founded by the Victoria University of Manchester, the University of Liverpool and the University of Leeds)
- 1911: University of Bristol School Examinations Council (founded by the University of Bristol)

The Central Welsh Board differed from most exam boards, as it was not controlled by a university and only offered examinations to schools and colleges in Wales. Intermediate schools in Wales had to use the Board, though other schools and colleges were free to choose.

The University of Birmingham disbanded its own exam board and joined the JMB in 1916.

==== School Certificate and Higher School Certificate ====
In 1918, the first national qualifications for England, Wales and Northern Ireland were introduced: the School Certificate, taken at 16, and the Higher School Certificate, taken at 18. The existing exam boards started offering the new qualifications, normally in place of their own qualifications.

In 1930, the University of London Extension Board renamed itself the University of London Matriculation and School Examinations Council before becoming University of London University Entrance and School Examinations Council and School Examinations Department in 1951.

The University of Durham Matriculation and School Examination Board renamed itself the Durham University Examinations Board in the 1930s.

The Welsh Joint Education Committee (WJEC) was founded by the Welsh local authorities in 1948. It took over many of the Central Welsh Board's responsibilities, including running Wales's exam system.

==== GCE (O Level and A Level) ====
In 1951, the General Certificate of Education (GCE) was introduced. It was split into two stages: Ordinary Level (O Level, taken at 16) and Advanced Level (A Level, taken at 18). These qualifications replaced the School Certificate and the Higher School Certificate respectively.

The existing exam boards offered the GCE, alongside the Northern Ireland Schools Examination Council .

These boards were soon joined by the Associated Examining Board (AEB), which was founded by City & Guilds in 1953.

The Southern Universities' Joint Board for School Examinations was founded in 1954 as a successor to the University of Bristol School Examinations Council.

The Durham University Examinations Board ceased to exist in 1964.

The University of London University Entrance and School Examinations Council and School Examinations Department was renamed the University of London School Examinations Board in 1984.

==== CSE ====
In 1965, the Certificate of Secondary Education (CSE) was introduced. It was aimed at the 80% of 16-year-old students who did not take O Levels and, until then, had left school with no qualifications. CSEs were administered on a local basis, with local boards offering the qualifications. The local boards in England were new organisations, while in Wales and Northern Ireland (where universities did not control the existing boards) the existing boards were used. The CSE boards were:

- Associated Lancashire Schools Examining Board
- East Anglian Examinations Board
- East Midland Regional Examinations Board
- Metropolitan Regional Examination Board
- Middlesex Regional Examination Board
- Northern Ireland Schools Examination Council
- North Regional Examinations Board
- North West Regional Examinations Board
- South-East Regional Examinations Board
- South Western Examinations Board
- Southern Regional Examination Board
- Welsh Joint Education Committee (WJEC)
- West Midlands Regional Examination Board
- West Yorkshire and Lindsey Regional Examining Board
- Yorkshire Regional Examinations Board

In 1979, the neighbouring Metropolitan and Middlesex boards merged to form the London Regional Examinations Board. The West Yorkshire and Lindsey, and Yorkshire and Humberside Boards also merged to form the Yorkshire and Humberside Regional Examinations Board in 1982.

==== GCSE ====
To create a more egalitarian system, the O Levels and CSE (but not the A Level) were replaced by the General Certificate of Secondary Education (GCSE) in 1986. As O Levels and CSEs had used different exam boards (except in Wales and Northern Ireland), new 'examining groups' were created. In England, the four examining groups were consortia of regional GCE and CSE exam boards, while in Wales and Northern Ireland they were the existing boards, making six boards in total:

- London East Anglian Group (formed by the University of London School Examinations Board, the London Regional Examination Board and the East Anglian Examinations Board)
- Midland Examining Group (MEG, formed by the University of Cambridge Local Examinations Syndicate, the Southern Universities' Joint Board, the Oxford and Cambridge Schools Examination Board, East Midland Regional Examinations Board and the West Midlands Examinations Board)
- Northern Examining Association (NEA, formed by the Joint Matriculation Board, the Associated Lancashire Schools Examining Board, the North Regional Examinations Board, the North West Regional Examinations Board and the Yorkshire and Humberside Regional Examinations Board)
- Northern Ireland Schools Examination Council
- Southern Examining Group (SEG, formed by the Associated Examining Board, the University of Oxford Delegacy of Local Examinations, the South-East Regional Examinations Board, South Western Examinations Board and Southern Regional Exams Board)
- Welsh Joint Education Committee (WJEC)

As CSEs were no longer offered, the CSE boards effectively ceased to operate as independent boards and instead became part of their larger examining groups (some were even taken over by larger members of their groups, such as the Southern Regional Examinations Board, which was acquired by the Oxford Delegacy of Local Examinations in 1985 to form the Oxford School Examinations Board; and the South-East Regional Examinations Board and South Western Examinations Board, which merged with the AEB in 1987. The GCE boards, however, retained a degree of autonomy, as they still offered A Levels independently.

Though the boards were regional, schools were entirely free to pick which board they did their GCSE qualifications with and could mix and match between subjects.

When the Certificate of Achievement (now the Entry Level Certificate, a qualification below GCSE level) was introduced, the GCSE examining groups were responsible for administering the qualification.

==== Creation of the current boards ====
It was not long before the GCE (A Level) boards and GCSE examining groups began to formally merge or enter into even closer working relationships. This made sense, as it allowed merged boards to offer both GCSE and A Level qualifications and the boards were working together to offer the GCSE qualifications anyway. Many boards also took the opportunity to merge with vocational exam boards, as vocational qualifications became more common in schools. The government encouraged this, as they wanted to simplify the system by having fewer exam boards.

===== AQA =====
All five members of the Northern Examining Association merged in 1992 to form NEAB. In 1994, the Oxford Schools Examinations Board sold its GCSE functions to the Associated Examining Board (OSEB's A Level functions went to UCLES). NEAB, the AEB and the vocational City & Guilds formed the Assessment and Qualifications Alliance (AQA) in 1997, with the AEB and NEAB formally merging into AQA in 2000 (City & Guilds chose to remain independent, but sold its GNVQ provision to AQA). AQA is run as an educational charity.

===== Cambridge OCR =====
The University of Cambridge Local Examinations Syndicate (UCLES) took over the Southern Universities' Joint Board in 1990 and the Midland Examining Group (MEG) in 1993. When the Oxford Schools Examinations Board was abolished in 1995, its A Level functions were transferred to UCLES (its GCSE functions went to AEB/SEG). In the same year, UCLES also took over the Oxford and Cambridge Schools Examination Board (OCSEB). UCLES then merged all its A Level boards together to form the Oxford and Cambridge Examinations and Assessment Council (OCEAC). This left UCLES offering A Levels under the OCSEB name, GCSEs under the MEG name and some vocational qualifications under the UODLE name. This situation continued until 1998, when UCLES took over the vocational Royal Society of Arts Examinations Board. Following the merger, it chose to use the name Oxford, Cambridge and RSA Examinations (OCR) for all its UK qualifications. In September 2025 the exam board was renamed, becoming Cambridge OCR. Cambridge OCR is now the only major exam board owned by a university and is still run by the University of Cambridge, through its Cambridge University Press & Assessment division.

Cambridge Assessment also controls CIE, a predominately international exam board. CIE started offering some qualifications to English, Welsh and Northern Irish state schools in 2008, though it later withdrew from this market when the reformed GCSEs and A Levels (examined 2017 onwards) were introduced.

===== Edexcel =====
The University of London School Examinations Board merged with the London and East Anglian Group to form the University of London Examinations & Assessment Council (known as London Examinations or ULEAC) in 1991. In 1996, London Examinations merged with the vocational BTEC to form the Edexcel Foundation (the legal entity called London Qualifications). Though it originally ran as an educational charity like AQA, the Foundation was taken over by Pearson in 2003 (and renamed simply Edexcel), making it the only British exam board to be run by a profit-making company.

===== CCEA =====
The Northern Ireland Schools Examination Council became the Northern Ireland School Examinations and Assessment Council before being replaced by the Council for the Curriculum, Examinations and Assessment (CCEA) in 1994. It is a non-departmental public body.

ICAAE, a division of ICAA, was founded in 1989. It specialises in a small number of business and ICT courses. It began offering GCSEs in 1997, in partnership with CCEA. In 2009, it began offering exams independently of CCEA. It stopped offering such exams a few years later.

===== WJEC =====
Unlike the other boards, WJEC did not experience any major organisational changes and is still owned by the Welsh local authorities, though it operates independently. In 2014, WJEC launched a new brand, Eduqas, for new Ofqual-accredited qualifications (mostly offered in England), while retaining the name WJEC for Welsh Government-regulated qualifications.

== Scotland ==
There is just one exam board in Scotland which offers all of Scotlands qualifications. Since 2 December 2025 this has been, Qualifications Scotland, after it was announced by the Scottish Government in June 2021 that the previous exam board, the SQA (Scottish Qualifications Authority) was to be dissolved.

=== History ===
Previously, academic qualifications were awarded by the SQA, and prior to that the Scottish Examination Board (SEB), and before that the Scottish Certificate of Education Examination Board (SCEEB), while vocational qualifications were awarded by the Scottish Vocational Education Council (SCOTVEC).

== Examination boards working together ==
The UK's examination boards sometimes work together. For example, they sometimes offer qualifications jointly or share training materials for common parts of specifications.

The JCQ (Joint Council for Qualifications) is a common voice for UK exam boards. The JCQ is made up of AQA, CCEA, City & Guilds, Edexcel, OCR, SQA and WJEC. Among its roles, it devises standard rules for exams and publishes statistics.

== See also ==
- Cambridge Pre-U
- Cambridge O level and A level Past Paper to Marks Scheme Searcher
