= Kathleen Tattersall =

English educationist (1942–2013)

Kathleen Tattersall OBE
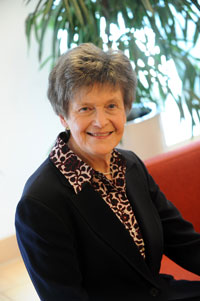

Chair and Chief Regulator of Ofqual
- In office April 8, 2008 – July 2, 2010
- Prime Minister: Gordon Brown; David Cameron
- Education Secretary: Ed Balls; Michael Gove
- Preceded by: Position created
- Succeeded by: Amanda Spielman (2011)^{[a]}

Personal details
- Born: 11 April 1942 Burnley, Lancashire, England
- Died: 23 January 2013 (aged 70) Aughton, Lancashire, England
- Domestic partner: Geraldine Boocock
- Education: University of Manchester
- Occupation: Educationalist
- a. Office vacant from July 3, 2010 to July 13, 2011

Kathleen Tattersall OBE (11 April 1942 – 23 January 2013) was a British educationalist, specialising in examination administration. She was the leader of five examination boards in the United Kingdom before becoming the first head of exams regulator Ofqual.

== Early life ==
Kathleen Tattersall was born in Burnley on 11 April 1942, the only child of Ellen Tattersall (née Mason) and Tom Tattersall. Tattersall was educated at Paddock House Convent Grammar School in Oswaldtwistle. She then went on to study at the University of Manchester, gaining a bachelor's degree in 1963, Postgraduate Certificate in Education (PGCE) in 1964 and, later, a Master of Education degree in 1975.

== Teaching career ==
Upon completing her PGCE, Tattersall spent the next seven-and-a-half years as a teacher, working in three different types of school from 1964. She began as a history teacher at the school she attended herself, Paddock House Convent Grammar School in Oswaldtwistle. Wishing to escape 'the oppressive nature of the examinations system', she moved to St. Augustine's Junior School in Burnley. This move was short-lived, as Tattersall found working at a primary school exposed 'all [her] faults and limitations as a teacher'. She returned to secondary education, becoming head of history at St Hilda's Roman Catholic Girls' High School, a comprehensive school, also in Burnley. It was at this school that Tattersall first taught for Certificate of Secondary Education (CSE) exams, as well as O Level and A Level.

== Exam boards administrator ==
Despite having no experience as an examiner, Tattersall successfully applied to be an assistant secretary (manager) at the Associated Lancashire Schools Examining Board (ALSEB), the smallest of England's 13 regional CSE examination boards, beginning employment in 1972. She worked her way up to deputy secretary before becoming secretary (leader) of the ALSEB in 1982.

In 1982, Tattersall took a secondment from ASLEB to the Schools Council to research differentiated examinations in preparation for the proposed merger of O Level and CSE into what became the GCSE. This research was published as Schools Council Examinations Bulletin 42 in 1983.

Tattersall jumped directly from the smallest CSE board to the largest when she became head of the neighbouring North West Regional Examinations Board (NWREB) in 1985. The same year, the NWREB entered into a consortium with the ALSEB and three other local exam boards, forming the Northern Examining Association (NEA) to offer the new General Certificate of Secondary Education (GCSE) qualification, which replaced the O Level and CSE from 1988.

In 1990, Tattersall moved to become leader of the oldest member of the NEA, the Joint Matriculation Board (JMB). As well as providing GCSEs through the NEA, the JMB also offered A Levels independently.

The JMB merged with the other four members of the NEA – the ALSEB, the NWREB, the North Regional Examinations Board and Yorkshire and Humberside Regional Examinations Board – in 1992, creating the Northern Examinations and Assessment Board (NEAB). The merged organised appointed Tattersall as its chief executive. While Tattersall led NEAB, it grew to be the biggest provider of GCSEs across England, Wales and Northern Ireland.

By the late 1990s, Government policy was to reduce the number of exam boards in the UK, replacing them with larger awarding bodies offering vocational, as well as academic, qualifications. Thus, in 1997, Tattersall led NEAB into a federation with AEB/SEG (an academic exam board) and City & Guilds (a vocational qualifications provider) called the Assessment and Qualifications Alliance (AQA). AQA, the UK's largest awarding body, appointed Tattersall as its first director general on 1 April 1998. She continued this role when NEAB and AEB/SEG (but not City & Guilds) formally merged under the AQA name in on 1 April 2000.

During her time at AQA, Tattersall was also chair of the Joint Council for General Qualifications, an umbrella group representing all British exam boards. In this role, Tattersall sought to ensure that examiners' professional judgements, rather than statistics, were used to award grades when revised A Level exams were introduced in 2002.

On 30 September 2003, Tattersall retired from AQA. Tattersall soon came out of retirement, however, to become chair of the Chartered Institute of Educational Assessors, a professional body for examiners, in 2005 and held this role until 2008.

== Chief regulator ==
In 2007, Tattersall was appointed the inaugural chair and chief regulator of Ofqual, the new exams 'watchdog', taking up her post on its formation on 8 April 2008. Initially, Ofqual operated as part of the Qualifications and Curriculum Authority in London, but moved to Coventry and became a non-ministerial government department in 2010, still led by Tattersall.

At Ofqual, Tattersall was open about the difficulties of comparing exam results over time and urged better communication between exams authorities and the general public.

Tattersall resigned from Ofqual with immediate effect on 2 July 2010, less than two months after the Conservative-Liberal Democrat coalition government came to power. In her resignation letter, Tattersall stated it was 'clear that the Government is bringing a fresh perspective to public policy, in education as in other areas' and it was 'in the best interests both of Government and of the education sector for Ofqual to have a new chair'.

== Later life ==
Tattersall was critical of exam reforms under Secretary of State for Education Michael Gove in the early 2010s. In response to Gove's later-aborted plans to scrap GCSEs and replace them with a new qualification only accessible to higher ability students, she said:

No one who is responsible for the education of young people should be proud to introduce a system which will result in a greater number of students leaving school with no qualifications. Education is about encouraging success and the raising of aspirations, not the writing off of a generation, which is what this new, untried, untested policy, based on prejudice and untruths, will bring about.

In 2011, Tattersall became chair of the board of the Northern School of Contemporary Dance in Leeds.

In November 2012, Tattersall became president of the Association for Educational Assessment–Europe.

Tattersall died of stomach cancer in Aughton, Lancashire on 23 January 2013, aged 70. She was survived by her partner, Geraldine Boocock.

== Honours ==
Shortly before retiring from AQA, Tattersall was awarded an OBE for services to education in the Queen's 2003 Birthday Honours.

Tattersall's work in governance at the University of Manchester and its predecessors was also honoured. In 1997, Tattersall joined the council of her alma mater, the Victoria University of Manchester, and chaired its audit committee until the institution merged with UMIST to form the University of Manchester in 2004. After the merger, Tattersall became a member of the university's board of governors until 2011. In recognition of these 14 years of service, Tattersall was awarded the University of Manchester's Medal of Honour in 2012, though died before she could be presented with it.
