= Joint Council for Qualifications =

British qualification collective

- Abbreviation: JCQ
- Predecessor: Joint Council for General Qualifications (1998–2003)
- Formation: January 2004
- Location(s): Millbank; London, SW1
- Members: AQA; CCEA; City & Guilds; Edexcel; NCFE; Cambridge OCR; SQA; WJEC
- CEO: Margaret Farragher
- Affiliations: Federation of Awarding Bodies; UCAS; Regulators in England, Northern Ireland, Scotland and Wales
- Website: www.jcq.org.uk

The Joint Council for Qualifications (JCQ) is a community interest company acting as a single voice for the eight largest qualification providers in the United Kingdom, offering GCSE, GCE, Scottish Highers and vocationally related qualifications: AQA, CCEA, City & Guilds, Edexcel, NCFE, Cambridge OCR, SQA and WJEC. The JCQ closely monitors examination administration, the invigilation of examinations (exams) at individual schools and other centres, and the activities of examination officers.

== About ==
The JCQ was established in January 2004, succeeding the Joint Council for General Qualifications (JCGQ) from 1998 to 2003. Its purpose is to bring together major educational and vocational examination boards in the United Kingdom and oversee testing standards. The JCQ should not be confused with Ofqual (the Office of Qualifications and Examinations Regulation), which holds the authority to regulate and accredit British examination boards. The JCQ facilitates collaboration among its member awarding bodies by:

- providing, wherever possible, common administrative arrangements for the schools and colleges and other providers which offer their qualifications
- dealing with the regulators, in responding to proposals and initiatives on assessment and the curriculum
- dealing with the media on issues affecting all member bodies
- helping the awarding bodies to work together to create common standards, regulations and guidance
- helping them to regulate themselves against those agreed standards as well as monitoring any exceptions
- providing a forum for members to discuss issues with each other, with partner organisations and with the regulators
- ensuring examinations are managed under consistent regulations.

== Regulations and examination practices ==
The JCQ provides rules and regulations concerning the exams. These are updated annually and published on the JCQ website.

British examination boards for GCSEs and GCE A-levels (i.e. AQA, Edexcel, Cambridge OCR, WJEC, CCEA) are obliged to comply with JCQ's regulations, whereas Cambridge International are not obliged to comply with them for their international GCSEs.

== See also ==
- Examination boards in the United Kingdom
