= Joint Matriculation Board =

Former British examination board

- Abbreviation: JMB
- Merged into: NEAB
- Formation: 1903
- Dissolved: 1992
- Purpose: Examination board
- Headquarters: Manchester, UK
- Region served: England, Wales and Northern Ireland
- Secretary (at closure): Kathleen Tattersall

The Joint Matriculation Board of the Universities of Manchester, Liverpool, Leeds, Sheffield and Birmingham (JMB), sometimes referred to as the Northern Universities Joint Matriculation Board, was an examination board, operating in England, Wales and Northern Ireland between 1903 and 1992. It became part of NEAB, which itself is now part of AQA.

== Beginnings ==
The Joint Matriculation Board was founded by the Victoria University of Manchester, the University of Liverpool and the University of Leeds. The universities had been part of the same institution (the Victoria University), but were in the process of de-merging. The universities set up the board to maintain a common entrance exam. The board allowed its exams to be taken by local schools, which was to become its main business.

The University of Sheffield joined the board in 1905. The University of Birmingham followed in 1916, spreading the board's activities to the Midlands.

== Status ==
When the first national qualifications, the School Certificate (SC) and Higher School Certificate (HSC) were introduced, the JMB offered the exams and rose to be the most popular exam board for the qualifications. When the SC and HSC were replaced by the GCE Ordinary Level and GCE Advanced Level respectively, JMB took on the new qualifications and continued to be a leading provider.

The government introduced the Certificate of Secondary Education (CSE) in 1965 for the majority of students working below O Level standard, but the JMB – like all the other GCE exam boards – was not asked to administer the new qualification. Instead, new regional exam boards were created for this purpose, to operate in parallel with the GCE boards.

Despite the GCE boards also being regional, schools were free to choose which one they entered their students for exams with. The JMB began to exploit this when they eventually began to market themselves outside their northern and Midlands heartland from 1978.

== Beginning of rationalisation ==
In 1988, the GCE O Level and CSE were merged to form a new qualification: the General Certificate of Secondary Education (GCSE). This posed a problem, as, in England, the O Level and CSE had completely separate exam boards. To solve this, four English examining groups were created. Each group was made up of at least one GCE board and two or more CSE boards. The JMB became part of the Northern Examining Association (NEA), along with four CSE boards: the Associated Lancashire Schools Examining Board, the Northern Regional Examinations Board, the North West Regional Examinations Board and the Yorkshire Regional Examinations Board. The JMB continued to offer A Level exams independently.

== Merger ==
As CSEs were now extinct, the old CSE boards effectively ceased to exist outside their GCSE examining groups. The NEA took this opportunity to rationalise and the JMB merged with the four other NEA members to form the Northern Examinations and Assessment Board (NEAB) in 1992. It was at this point that the universities behind the JMB took a more backseat role, with the NEAB becoming a charity and the universities remaining only as board members.

NEAB then merged with AEB/SEG to form the Assessment and Qualifications Alliance (AQA) in 2000. AQA's board is not required to include representatives of any of the JMB universities, though it does have representatives from Universities UK.

For replacement certificates, verification of results services or confirmation of results to third parties, former JMB students have to contact AQA.
