= GCSE Science =

British educational qualification

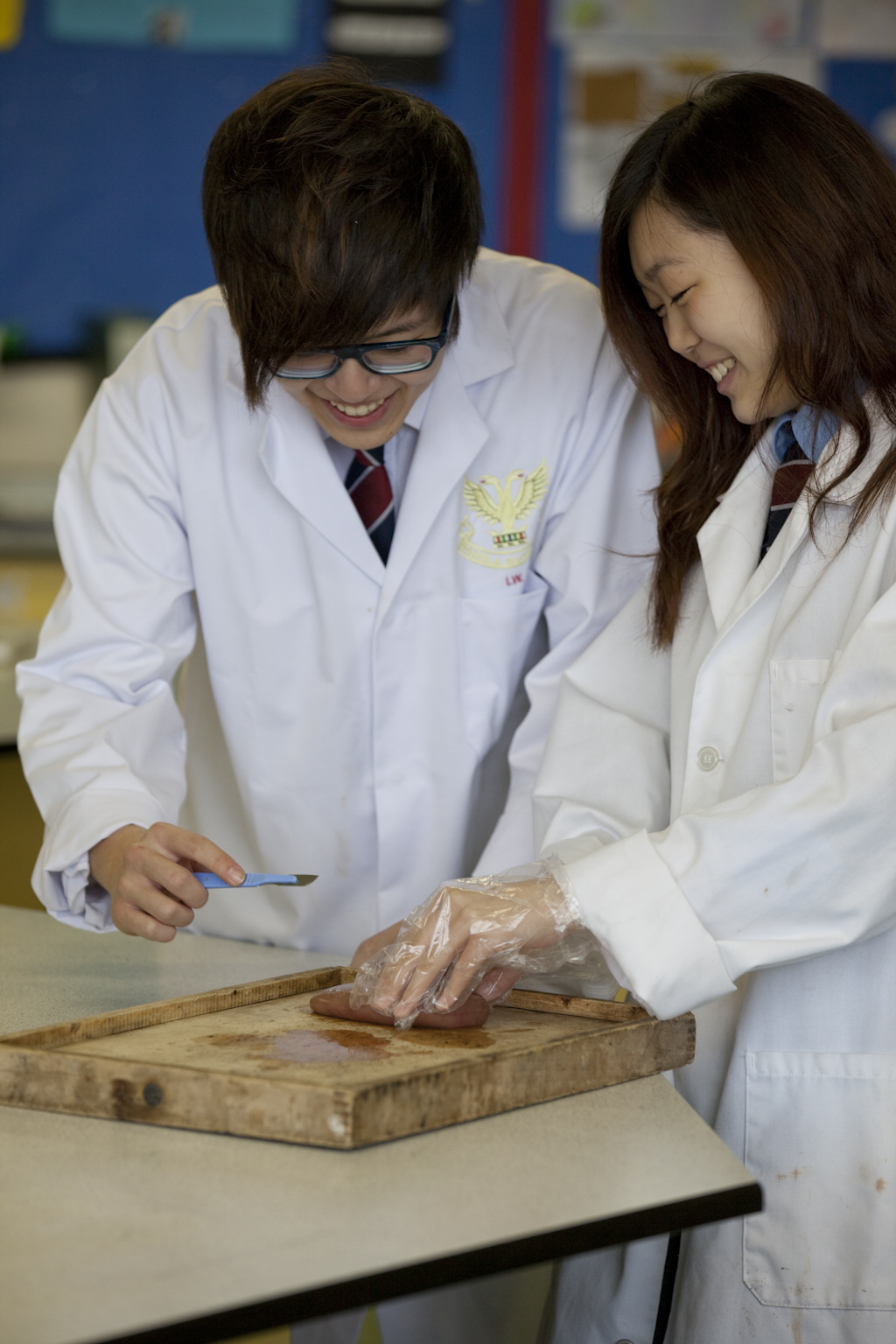
Dissection as part of a GCSE Biology lesson at Ruthin School, Wales

In the GCSE system in England and Wales, science at GCSE level is studied through Biology, Chemistry and Physics.

== Double Award ==
Assessment in Combined Science results in two GCSEs. Those with GCSEs in Combined Science can progress to A Levels in all of the three natural science subjects. Prior to this, around 1996, Combined Science GCSEs were available as an alternative to three separate Sciences for many exam boards.

Candidates aiming for the Combined Science double award can take exams at either Higher Tier (HT) or Foundation Tier (FT) level.

AQA offer two different specifications entitled Synergy and Trilogy.

== Triple Award ==
Triple Award Science, commonly referred to as Triple Science, results in three separate GCSEs in Biology, Chemistry and Physics and provides the broadest coverage of the main three science subjects at GCSE level.

The qualifications are offered by the five main awarding bodies in England; AQA, Edexcel, OCR, CIE and Eduqas.

== Concerns ==
In August 2018, Ofqual announced that it had intervened to adjust the GCSE Science grade boundaries for students who had taken the "higher tier" paper in its new double award science exams and performed poorly, due to an excessive number of students in danger of receiving a grade of "U" or "unclassified".

In 2020, Teach First published a report stating that only two female scientists, chemist and crystallographer Rosalind Franklin and paleoanthropologist Mary Leakey, were included in the GCSE Science curriculum, versus 40 male scientists who were named. The report argued that the lack of female role models in the science curriculum was perpetuating gender biases in the profession.
