= Northern Examining Association =

Former examination board in the UK

- Abbreviation: NEA
- Successor: NEAB
- Formation: 1985
- Dissolved: 1992
- Purpose: Examination board
- Headquarters: Manchester, UK
- Region served: England, Wales and Northern Ireland

The Northern Examining Association (NEA) was an examination board offering GCSEs in England, Wales and Northern Ireland from 1985 until 1992, when it was reconstituted as NEAB.

== History ==
The NEA was formed in 1985 to as one of the six exam boards to administer the new GCSE qualification, which was first taught in 1986 and first awarded in 1988.

Like the other three original GCSE exam boards in England, the NEA was an 'examining group' composed of existing exam boards:

- The Joint Matriculation Board
- The Associated Lancashire Schools Examining Board
- The Northern Regional Examinations Board
- The North West Regional Examinations Board
- The Yorkshire and Humberside Regional Examinations Board

The Joint Matriculation Board was a General Certificate of Education board, offering O Levels and A Levels, while the remaining four boards provided CSEs. As O Levels and CSEs ceased to exist upon the introduction of GCSEs, only the Joint Matriculation Board continued to offer any qualifications outside the NEA.

The NEA operated from the six offices of its constituent exam board: the three separate offices of the Joint Matriculation Board, Associated Lancashire Schools Examining Board and North West Regional Examinations Board in Manchester, the Northern Regional Examinations Board's office in Newcastle upon Tyne and the Yorkshire and Humberside Regional Examinations Board's two offices in Harrogate and Sheffield.

With all its members except the Joint Matriculation Board now only offering qualification within the NEA, the exam boards that made up the NEA decided to merge in July 1991 and did so in 1992, becoming NEAB (Northern Examinations and Assessment Board).
