= Southern Examining Group =

Former examination board in the UK

- Abbreviation: SEG
- Merged into: AQA
- Formation: 1987
- Dissolved: 2000
- Purpose: Examination board
- Headquarters: Guildford, UK
- Region served: England, Wales and Northern Ireland
- Parent organization: Associated Examining Board (1994–2000)

The Southern Examining Group (SEG) was an examination board offering GCSEs in England, Wales and Northern Ireland formally established in 1987. In 1994, it was taken over by the Associated Examining Board, but kept its own identity until the AEB merged with NEAB to form AQA in 2000.

== History ==
In the 1970s, the UK's Department for Education and Science became increasingly committed to replacing GCE O Level and CSE exams with a single exam (later named the GCSE), which it wished to be administered by regional consortia of existing O Level and CSE exam boards. Therefore, the examination boards of southern England formed a joint working group in 1978. Its members were:

- Associated Examining Board (AEB)
- South-East Regional Examinations Board
- Southern Regional Examinations Board
- South Western Examinations Board
- University of Oxford Delegacy of Local Examinations (from 1981)

As the GCSE was intended to replace the CSE, the three CSE boards in the group – the South-East, Southern and South Western boards – would not offer any qualifications outside the group (unlike the GCE boards – the AEB and Oxford Delegacy – who would still offer A Levels independently). Therefore, the CSE boards pursued merging with the GCE boards. Consequently, the Southern Board merged with the Oxford Delegacy in 1985 to form the Oxford School Examinations Board and the South-East and South Western boards merged with the AEB on 1 April 1987. This meant the five original exam boards in the group had been reduced to two: the Associated Examining Board and the Oxford School Examinations Board.

The Associated Examining Board and Oxford School Examinations Board formally launched the Southern Examining Group in 1987 and it awarded its first GCSEs in 1988. Initially, SEG struggled, losing one third of its total entry compared to its members' combined entry for the final year of O Levels and CSEs, but recovered by 1994 when its entries increased by 34%.

In 1994, the University of Oxford decided to exit the schools examinations market and broke up the Oxford School Examinations Board. It sold its A Level operations to the University of Cambridge Local Examinations Syndicate and its GCSE interests to the Associated Examining Board. Thus, the Associated Examining Board now controlled the Southern Examining Group entirely. The AEB retained the SEG's identity, meaning GCSEs continued to be offered under the SEG brand and A Levels under the AEB name. Though legally the AEB owned the SEG, both names were used equally, with the enlarged AEB sometimes referred to as AEB/SEG.

In 1997, AEB/SEG entered into an alliance with NEAB and City & Guilds known as the Assessment and Qualifications Alliance (AQA). In 2000, the AEB/SEG and NEAB (but not City & Guilds) formally merged under the name AQA and the AEB and SEG names disappeared.
