= Associated Examining Board =

Former British examination board

- Abbreviation: AEB
- Merged into: AQA
- Formation: 8 May 1953
- Dissolved: 1 April 2000
- Purpose: Examination board
- Headquarters: Guildford, UK
- Region served: England, Wales, Northern Ireland, and overseas schools
- Formerly called: Joint Examinations Board for the General Certificate of Education (May–December 1953); Associated Examining Board for the General Certificate of Education (December 1953–????)

The Associated Examining Board (AEB) was an examination board serving England, Wales and Northern Ireland from 1953 until 2000 when it merged with NEAB to form AQA.

== History ==
=== Formation ===
The Associated Examining Board was formed in response to the United Kingdom Ministry of Education's decision to introduce the General Certificate of Education (GCE) qualification, available at Ordinary Level and Advanced Level, in England, Wales and Northern Ireland from 1951. The new exams would attract a broader range of candidates than the School Certificate and Higher School Certificate that they replaced. While there were already eleven examination boards offering school qualifications across the UK, all eight of those based in England were affiliated with universities and focused very much on traditional academic subjects. Many involved with technical and vocational education felt that a new exam board was needed to offer a broader range of subjects and syllabi to cater for the new candidates the GCE would attract.

The examination board was established as The Joint Examinations Board for the General Certificate of Education at a meeting at Merchant Taylors' Hall, London on 8 May 1953. By December, it had changed its name to The Associated Examining Board for the General Certificate of Education after complaints that its name was too similar to the Joint Matriculation Board. The new exam board was initially sponsored by City & Guilds, making it the only exam board based in England not linked to a university. The AEB set its first examinations in 1955.

=== Expansion ===
The board began small, with just 4,791 entries from 151 centres, mostly colleges, in its first year. It grew rapidly, with its exams being recognised as equivalent to other boards' by several universities, including Oxford and Cambridge, by summer 1956. By 1963, there were 228,443 entries for AEB exams. The AEB grew and eventually became the largest provider of exams at both O Level and A Level.

On 30 September 1967, the AEB became financially independent from City & Guilds. By now, the AEB was based in Aldershot, having moved there in January 1966. The AEB moved again, this time 10 miles to a purpose-built office on the University of Surrey's campus in Guildford, in autumn 1985.

=== Collaboration ===
By the 1970s, the UK's Department for Education and Science became increasingly committed to replacing GCE O Level and CSE exams with a single exam (later named the GCSE), which it wished to be administered by regional consortia of existing O Level and CSE exam boards. Therefore, AEB joined with the three CSE examination boards in southern England – the South-East Regional Examinations Board, the Southern Regional Examinations Board and the South Western Examinations Board – to form a joint working group in 1978. The University of Oxford Delegacy of Local Examinations, a GCE board like the AEB, joined the group in 1981.

Despite the plans for GCSE, the AEB (and the Oxford Delegacy) would continue to offer A Levels independently. The three CSE boards, however, would now only offer qualifications as part of the group. Therefore, the CSE boards pursued merging with the GCE boards. Consequently, the South-East Regional Examinations Board and South Western Examinations Board merged with the AEB on 1 April 1987 (meanwhile, the Southern Regional Examinations Board merged with the Oxford Delegacy in 1985 to form the Oxford School Examinations Board). This left the Associated Examining Board and the Oxford School Examinations Board as the only members of their local GCSE group, which they formally launched as the Southern Examining Group in 1987 in time for the first GCSE exams in 1988.

=== Final years ===
In 1994, the University of Oxford decided to exit the schools examinations market and sold its share of the Southern Examining Group to the AEB (its A Level interests transferred to the University of Cambridge Local Examinations Syndicate). Thus, the Associated Examining Board now controlled the Southern Examining Group entirely. The AEB retained the SEG's identity, meaning GCSEs continued to be offered under the SEG brand and A Levels under the AEB name. Though legally the AEB owned the SEG, both names were used equally, with the enlarged AEB sometimes referred to as AEB/SEG.

In 1997, the AEB entered into an alliance with two other exam boards, NEAB and City & Guilds, known as the Assessment and Qualifications Alliance (AQA). The 1998 examination certificates featured just the AQA name. By 1999, examination papers were dual-branded with both the AQA and AEB or SEG names. In 2000, the AEB and NEAB (but not City & Guilds) formally merged under the name AQA and the AEB and SEG names disappeared entirely. As AEB/SEG and NEAB overlapped in the qualifications they offered, AQA retained two specifications for many subjects, with schools able to choose between the two.
