= NCFE (charity) =

British examination board and registered charity

- Formation: 1848
- Type: Examination board awarding organisation
- Headquarters: Q6 Quorum Park, Benton Lane, Newcastle upon Tyne, NE12 8BT
- Region served: England; Wales; Northern Ireland
- CEO: David Gallagher
- Website: ncfe.org.uk
- Formerly called: Northern Council for Further Education (1981–1990s)

NCFE (formerly the Northern Council for Further Education) is an awarding organisation and registered educational charity providing qualifications in England, Wales and Northern Ireland. NCFE is regulated by Ofqual in England, and recognised by Qualifications Wales and the Council for the Curriculum, Examinations & Assessment in Northern Ireland.

Working in vocational and technical learning, NCFE is responsible for the design, development and certification of a broad range of qualifications and awards that are nationally recognised. The qualifications NCFE provides range from Entry Level up to Level 7 and span a wide range of sector specialisms. NCFE is also a registered end-point assessment organisation (EPAO), whilst also providing pre- and on-programme support for apprenticeships.

== History ==
The Northern Union of Mechanics' Institutes (NUMI), NCFE's founding organisation, was established in 1848. NUMI's first report proclaimed its objective to "become a centre from whence the elements of knowledge and civilisation shall go on with an unceasing progress, conferring intellectual, scientific and moral blessings throughout the length and breadth of the Northern Counties."

In 1920, NUMI was succeeded by the Northern Counties Technical Examinations Council (NCTEC) and, for the following 61 years, was responsible for providing examinations and certifications to schools and technical colleges, where it was backed by 9 northern local education authorities.

In 1981, the NCTEC combined with the Northern Advisory Council for Further Education (NACFE), and became the Northern Council for Further Education.

In the 1990s, the education sector became independent from the government and NCFE became a national company, and thus were no longer known as the Northern Council for Further Education, but simply as the standalone NCFE.

Over the past decade, NCFE has acquired brands including CACHE and Skills Forward that have now been integrated into NCFE, strengthening the organisation's offer in healthcare, early years and skills diagnostics and assessment. NCFE has also invested in Campaign for Learning, a charity committed to the development of family and lifelong learning.

== Recognition ==
The charity has been selected on more than one occasion as a Times Top 100 Company in the Not For Profit (NFP) category NCFE's first entry into the Top 100 came in 2007 in the Small Companies category, but the organisation has risen through the ranks each year:

- 2007 – 77th (Small Companies)
- 2011 – 30th and 2* Accreditation (NFP)
- 2012 – 60th and 1* Accreditation (NFP)
- 2013 – 15th 2* Accreditation (NFP)

== Qualifications ==
NCFE offers a broad range of qualifications that cover an array of sector specialisms from Entry Level right up to Level 7. New awards in a variety of sectors are frequently introduced in order to keep up with the changing education landscape, the evolving labour market, and to tackle skills gaps. NCFE also provides further solutions to support learning as part of its end-to-end offering for learners and educators, including resources and guidance, CPD qualifications and innovative skills assessment tools.

=== Technical Education ===
NCFE's Technical Education offer provides learners ages 14–19 with a range of technical and vocational qualifications to help them progress through their chosen subject specialism. These include V Cert Technical Awards, Higher Technical Qualifications (HTQs) and qualifications and resources to help build bespoke study programmes.

T Levels are another technical qualification that NCFE offers, having won government contracts to design and award nine T Level qualifications for rollout between 2020 and 2023.

=== Apprenticeships ===
NCFE's apprenticeship offer spans pre-programme support (including initial assessment), on-programme qualifications and resources, on-demand and remotely invigilated assessment for Functional Skills, and an end-point assessment (EPA) service.

=== Learning for Work ===
For those aged 19 and above, NCFE offers lifelong learning opportunities helping individuals to develop and retrain across different sectors, through continuing professional development (CPD), regionally focused learning, traineeships, and reskilling and retraining provision.

== Partnerships and collaborative working ==
NCFE partnerships and collaborations include:

=== Fika ===
NCFE partnered with the mental fitness app Fika to launch the sector's first ever mental health fitness mobile app, to improve mental fitness in the further education sector.

=== WorldSkills UK ===
NCFE collaborated with WorldSkills UK to create the Centre of Excellence programme to advance vocational learning practice.

=== Association of Apprentices ===
NCFE was a founding partner of the Association of Apprentices (AoA) which was created in 2019 in an effort to help boost the number of apprentices staying on and completing their programme.

== Controversies ==
=== Ofqual fine for T-level failings ===
In July 2024, Ofqual, the UK exams watchdog, fined NFCE £300,000 for "major failings" with the papers sat by health and science T-level students in 2022. Ofqual said NCFE had failed to develop "valid question papers" for its T-level qualifications in healthcare, healthcare science, and science.

Examples of failings in question papers included questions about "the acidity of volcanoes" rather than the health-based questions relevant to the course. These failings were considered to contribute to a 1-in-3 dropout rate from health T-Level qualifications.
