= AQA Baccalaureate =

British educational qualification

The AQA Baccalaureate (known as the "AQA Bacc" for short) is a British educational qualification launched in April 2009 and managed by Charlotte Christie for the Assessment and Qualifications Alliance, or AQA, to be studied in Years 12 and 13. The qualification includes the existing A and AS Levels as part of the assessment, as well as mandatory enrichment activities and an extended project.

== Sections ==
- Three GCE A Levels of the student's choice
- Minimum of AS Level in General Studies, Critical Thinking or Citizenship
- Extended Project Qualification (EPQ)
- Enrichment: minimum of 100 hours in at least two of:
  - work-related learning
  - community participation
  - personal development activities
