= NEAB =

Examination board in the UK

Northern Examinations and Assessment Board
- Abbreviation: NEAB
- Merged into: AQA
- Formation: 1992
- Dissolved: 2000
- Merger of: JMB, ALSEB, NREB, NWREB and YHREB
- Headquarters: Manchester, UK
- Region served: England, Wales and Northern Ireland
- Chief Executive: Kathleen Tattersall (1992–1998); Heather James (1998–1999); Frank Cogley (1999–2000)

NEAB (Northern Examinations and Assessment Board) was an examination board serving England, Wales and Northern Ireland from 1992 until 2000 when it merged with AEB/SEG to form AQA.

== History ==
NEAB was formed in 1992 by the merger five of examination boards:

- The Joint Matriculation Board
- The Associated Lancashire Schools Examining Board
- The Northern Regional Examinations Board
- The North West Regional Examinations Board
- The Yorkshire and Humberside Regional Examinations Board (which itself was formed by the merger of The West Yorkshire and Lindsey Regional Examining Board and Yorkshire Regional Examinations Board in 1982)

Previously, these exam boards had been in a consortium together, the Northern Examining Association, to provide GCSEs, while the Joint Matriculation Board also offered A Levels independently. Merging allowed a single body to take on all these roles. The chief executive of NEAB for the majority of its existence was Kathleen Tattersall, who had previously led the Joint Matriculation Board.

Schools in England, Wales and Northern Ireland were able to choose any of the examination boards for award their qualifications and NEAB established itself as the biggest board in the UK.

In 1997, NEAB entered into an alliance with AEB/SEG and City & Guilds known as the Assessment and Qualifications Alliance (AQA). The 1998 examination certificates featured just the AQA name. By 1999, examination papers were dual-branded with both the AQA and NEAB names. In 2000, NEAB and AEB/SEG (but not City & Guilds) formally merged under the name AQA. As NEAB and AEB/SEG overlapped in the qualifications they offered, AQA retained two specifications for many subjects and do until this day, with schools able to choose between the two.
