= Council for the Curriculum, Examinations and Assessment =

Educational body in Northern Ireland

- Abbreviation: CCEA
- Formation: 1 April 1994
- Type: Non-departmental public body (NDPB)
- Headquarters: Belfast, Northern Ireland
- Location(s): Belfast, Northern Ireland Mallusk, Northern Ireland
- Region served: Northern Ireland, England and Wales
- Employees: 317
- Website: www.ccea.org.uk

The Council for the Curriculum, Examinations and Assessment (CCEA) is an awarding body in Northern Ireland. It develops and delivers qualifications, including GCSEs, AS, and A Levels, and provides curriculum support and assessments for schools. CCEA is a non-departmental public body and regulator, approving and monitoring Awarding Organisations offering qualifications in Northern Ireland.

CCEA was established on 1 April 1994 and is based in Belfast. It is responsible for designing, developing, and administering examinations and qualifications, as well as overseeing the assessment and certification of students in Northern Ireland. CCEA advises the Department of Education on matters related to the curriculum, assessment, examinations, and external qualifications, as well as accrediting and approving qualifications.

CCEA conducts and moderates examinations and assessments, ensuring standards are equivalent to those of other awarding bodies across the United Kingdom. It publishes and disseminates information related to the curriculum, assessment, and examinations and develops teaching support materials for schools.

Additionally, CCEA carries out research and development into the curriculum.

== Awarding qualifications ==
CCEA offers a wide range of qualifications, such as GCSEs, including the new GCSE Double Award specifications in vocational subjects, GCE A and AS levels, Entry Level Qualifications, Key-skills, Essential Skills, and Graded Objectives in Modern Languages. Due to educational reforms of the Conservative Party under Prime Minister David Cameron, CCEA (among other UK examination boards, i.e. Edexcel, AQA, OCR and WJEC) continuously redevelops syllabi for GCSEs and GCE A Levels. CCEA is a member of the Joint Council for Qualifications.

== Principal products and services ==
CCEA’s principal products and services are to meet the requirements outlined in the Education (NI) Order. CCEA’s duties and functions are therefore to:

- Keep under constant review all aspects of the curriculum, examinations and assessment for grant-aided schools and colleges of further education, and to undertake statutory consultation on proposals relating to legislation;
- Advise the Department of Education (NI) or the Minister for Education on matters concerning curriculum, assessments, examinations and external qualifications, and to accredit and approve qualifications;
- Conduct and moderate examinations and assessments, keeping standards in line with the rest of the UK;
- Publish and disseminate information relating to the curriculum, assessment and examinations;
- Develop and produce teaching support materials for use in schools and other educational Centres;
- Carry out research and development into curricula, examinations, assessments, new media and software/hardware environments.

== Miscellaneous ==
CCEA attracted media interest in 2014, due to allegations related to working conditions for some staff and the threat of strike action by CCEA’s recognised trade union NIPSA.

== Incorporated examination boards ==
- Northern Ireland School Examinations and Assessment Council (NISEAC)
- Northern Ireland School Examinations Council (NISEC)

== Chief Executive ==
The Chief Executive of CCEA is responsible for the operational delivery of examinations and assessments to thousands of pupils across Northern Ireland, the monitoring of standards in qualifications, and the formulation of relevant policy advice to the Department of Education.

Chief Executive - Gerry Campbell (March 2023 – present)
