= AQA =

British examination board and registered charity

- AQA Education
- AQA Education
- Formation: 7 November 1997 (alliance); 1 April 2000 (merger)
- Merger of: NEAB and AEB/SEG
- Type: Examination board
- Registration no.: 1073334
- Headquarters: Devas Street; Manchester; M15 6EX; United Kingdom
- Region served: England; Wales; Northern Ireland
- CEO: Colin Hughes
- Website: www.aqa.org.uk
- Formerly called: Assessment & Qualifications Alliance (1998–1998); Assessment and Qualifications Alliance (1998–2012)

AQA Education, trading as AQA (formerly the Assessment and Qualifications Alliance), is an awarding body in England, Wales and Northern Ireland. It compiles specifications and holds examinations in various subjects at GCSE and the A Levels and offers vocational qualifications. AQA is a registered charity and independent of the government. However, its qualifications and exam syllabi are regulated by the Government of the United Kingdom, which is the regulator for the public examinations system in England and Wales.

AQA is one of five awarding bodies which are recognised by schools across the country. AQA is also recognised by the regulators of the public exams systems for England, Wales and Northern Ireland to offer GCSE, AS and A Levels in the United Kingdom. AQA also offers the AQA Baccalaureate, a qualification also intended for students in Year 12 and 13 and which includes the study of three A-Levels, an extended project and extra-curricular enrichment activities. AQA is the largest examination board for GCSEs and GCE A Levels in England.

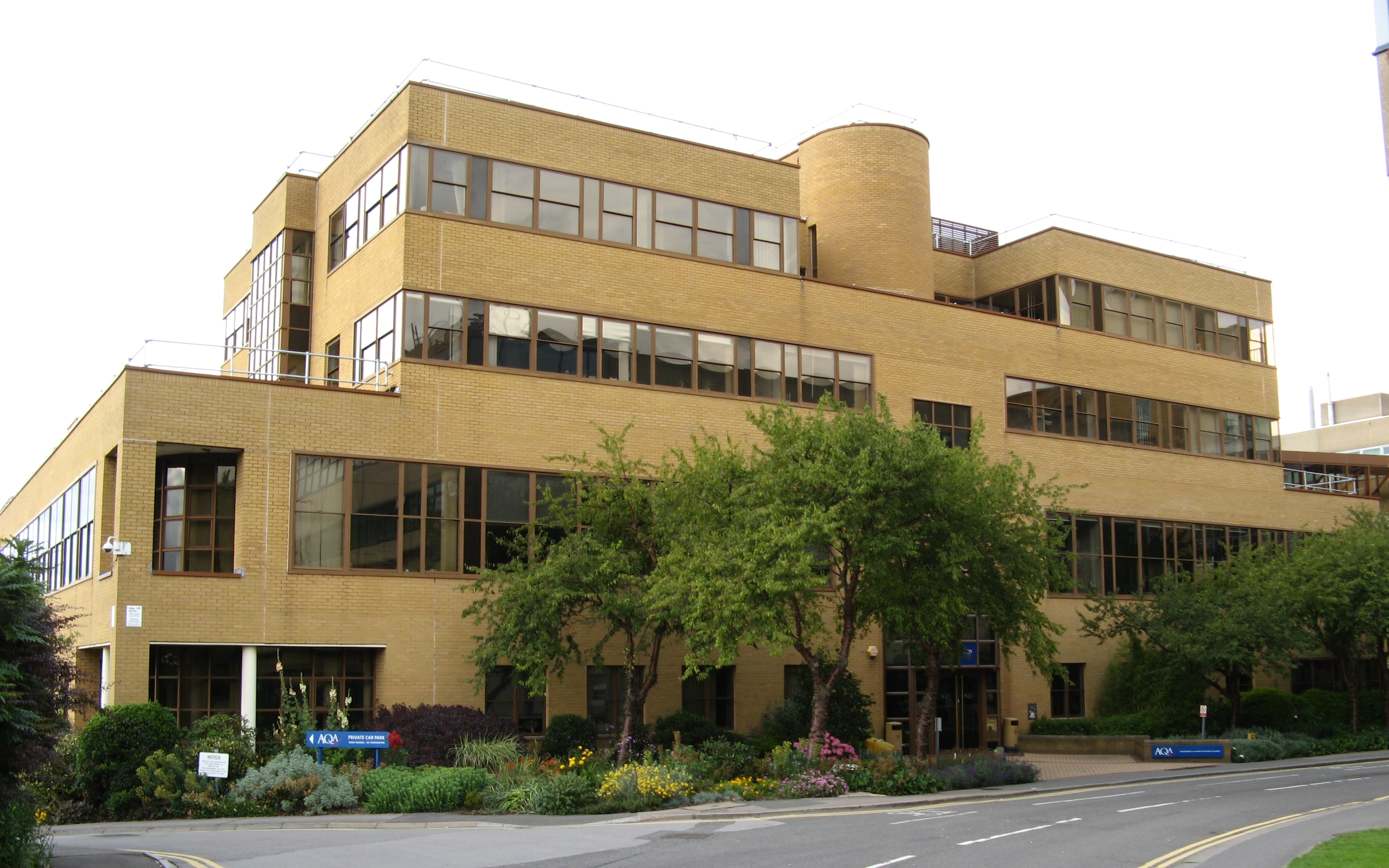
AQA administration office, Guildford

The organisation has several regional offices, the largest being in Milton Keynes, Guildford and Manchester.

== History ==
AQA was originally formed on 7 November 1997 as an alliance of NEAB and AEB/SEG exam boards and City & Guilds vocational awarding body. NEAB and AEB/SEG formally merged on 1 April 2000. City & Guilds chose to remain independent of the new organisation, but transferred its GNVQ provision to AQA.

AQA holds the candidate records and awards for the following historic exam boards:

- Associated Examining Board (AEB)
- Associated Lancashire Schools Examinations Board (ALSEB)
- Joint Matriculation Board (JMB)
- Northern Examining Association (NEA)
- Northern Examinations and Assessment Board (NEAB)
- North Regional Examinations Board (NREB)
- North West Regional Examinations Board (NWREB)
- North West Secondary Schools Examinations Board (NWSSEB)
- Southern Examining Group (SEG)
- South Eastern Regional Examinations (SEREB)
  - University of Bristol School Examinations Council (UBSEC)
- South West Regional Examinations Board (SWREB)
- Yorkshire and Humberside Regional Examinations Board (YHREB)
  - Yorkshire Regional Examinations Board (YREB)
  - The West Yorkshire and Lindsey Regional Examinations Board (TWYLREB)

== Examination reform ==
The Conservative Party under Prime Minister David Cameron initiated reforms for A Levels to change from a modular structure to a linear one. British examination boards (Edexcel, AQA, OCR and WJEC) regulated and accredited by the Government of the United Kingdom responded to the government's reform announcements by modifying syllabi of several A Level subjects. However, the Labour Party and in particular the member of parliament Tristram Hunt announced that it would seek to halt and reverse the reforms and maintain the modular A-Level system. Labour's policy, and the modular AS- and A-Level system, are supported and promoted by the University of Cambridge and by the University of Oxford.

The organisation announced that it will begin offering courses for which all assessment is carried out through examinations at the end of the course. This is commonly referred to as a linear course. Beforehand, they offered modular courses in England with several exams.

== Controversies ==
During the summer 2022 exam series, AQA came under heavy criticism after several of its exam papers contained topics not included in the subject specific 'advance information'. Following an announcement from the exams regulator Ofqual in December 2021, exam boards were required to produce advance information, covering the 'focus' of exams, to alleviate the disruption experienced by pupils during the COVID-19 pandemic. Ofqual criticised AQA and other exam boards for the 'distress' which mistakes on the advance information had caused pupils.

Shortly following the AQA A-Level Chemistry paper 2 (sat on the morning of 20 June 2022) photographs surfaced on social media, namely Twitter, showing the paper had been leaked potentially up to seven days before it took place.

In 2024, it was reported that the AQA's Chinese-language GCSE textbook removed all references to Taiwan under pressure from the Embassy of China, London.

== Chief executives ==
The Chief Executive of AQA runs the organisation on a day-to-day basis, while being accountable to the AQA Council. The role was known as the Director General from its introduction in April 1998 until July 2010.

- Kathleen Tattersall OBE, 1 April 1998 – 30 September 2003
- Mike Cresswell CBE, 1 October 2003 – 31 March 2010
- Andrew Hall, 4 June 2010 – 31 August 2017
- Toby Salt, 1 September 2017 – 8 September 2019
- Mark Bedlow, 9 September 2019 – 31 August 2020 (interim chief executive)
- Colin Hughes, 1 September 2020–

== See also ==
- Examination boards in the United Kingdom
- AQA Anthology
- Edexcel
