= Functional Skills Qualification =

Educational qualification in England

The Functional Skills Qualification is a frequently required component of post-16 education in England. The aim of Functional Skills is to encourage learners to develop and demonstrate their skills as well as learn how to select and apply skills in ways that are appropriate to their particular context in English, mathematics, ICT and digital skills. They provide a foundation for progression into employment or further technical education and develop skills for everyday life. Functional Skills are generally available in sixth form colleges, further education colleges, and tertiary colleges.

Functional Skills qualifications provide reliable evidence of a student's achievements against demanding content that is relevant to the workplace. They need to provide assessment of students' underpinning knowledge as well as their ability to apply this in different contexts.
