= GCE Ordinary Level (United Kingdom) =

England, Wales and Northern Ireland school qualification

The General Certificate of Education (GCE) Ordinary Level, also called the O-level or O level, was a subject-based academic qualification that was introduced in 1951, as a replacement for the 16+ School Certificate (SC). The O-level was meant to act as a pathway to the new, more in-depth and academically rigorous A-level (Advanced Level), in England, Wales and Northern Ireland.

Alternatives to the GCE Ordinary level were released during the qualification's timeline, including the complementary and more vocational Certificate of Secondary Education (CSE), intended for broadening the subjects available and offering qualifications in non-academic subjects, alongside the even more academically rigorous foundation for the GCE A-Level, called the AO-Level.

The O-Level, AO-Level and CSE were replaced in the United Kingdom in 1988 by the GCSE and later complementary IGCSE exams. The Scottish equivalent was the O-grade (replaced by the National 5 Curriculum for Excellence). An O-level branded qualification is still awarded by Cambridge International Examinations in select locations.

== Beginnings ==
The GCE Ordinary level was introduced in 1951, to replace the School Certificate in England, Wales and Northern Ireland. It was part of the post-war education reforms, alongside the GCE Advanced Level (or GCE A-Level), which had replaced the Higher School Certificate. With subject-based exam-only assessments, the GCE O-Level was intended to be an academically rigorous preparation for GCE A-Level study. The examinations were conducted by regional boards, with schools given the freedom to choose the board of their choice.

The qualification was introduced around the same timeline as Scotland's equivalent, the O-grade (replaced by the National 5 Curriculum for Excellence), was released.

Directly connected to the GCE O-Level was the AO-Level (Alternative Ordinary Level), formerly available in most subject areas. Sometimes incorrectly known as the Advanced Ordinary Level, the AO-Level syllabus and examination both assumed a higher degree of maturity on the part of candidates and employed teaching methods more commonly associated with A-Level study. The AO-Level was discontinued, with final qualifications awarded in 1988.

== Structure ==
O-levels were predominantly exam-based; this had advantages for students in part-time or evening education. Some commentators criticised this mainly exam-based approach as offering only partial proof of the pupil’s overall ability in comparison with other methods (e.g. coursework-based assessment). There was no summative 'school certificate': each subject was a separate O-level in its own right.

Madsen Pirie argued that the O-level was unfairly biased to boys because of the emphasis on exam-based learning and therefore girls were placed at a disadvantage. Pirie also observes that the GCSE focus on coursework has now disadvantaged boys and has reversed the gender gap in attainment to the level where girls outperform boys in all subjects.

== Grading ==
Until 1975, candidates were awarded only a pass or fail classification. Although candidates received an approximate indication of the marks awarded, O-Level Certificates simply listed those subjects in which a pass had been awarded; subjects in which a candidate had failed were not mentioned. The independent exam boards soon offered competing numeric and alphabetic classifications, for example 1, 2, 3, 4, 5 and 6 would be a pass whilst grades 7, 8 and 9 were fails from the JMB. From 1975 standardized alphabetic grades were introduced, with grades A, B, C, D and E being passes and F and U (Unclassified) fails. Between 1975 and 1985 grades were allocated primarily on a norm-referenced basis, assigning a fixed proportion of each cohort to each grade (A 10%, B 15%, C 25–30%, D 5–10%, E 5–10%, U 15–20%). However there were some exceptions, both at the subject and Exam Board level, with Latin and Greek pass rates being consistently higher than other subjects, with 75.4% passing in 1976 in contrast to an average 59% pass rate across all subjects e.g. Biology 56.4%, History 57%. The pass rate and top awards by the Oxford & Cambridge board were also consistently higher than the other boards e.g. in 1976 27% of Latin entrants gained an A and ~17% of French, German and Music candidates, which was attributed to the O&C board being primarily used by Independent schools. The proportion obtaining a pass, A-D, or equivalent was initially fixed at 57% – 58% and remained under 60% through the 1970s, though there was regional variation, with Northern Ireland awarding consistently more pass grades than Wales, e.g. in 1982 the pass rates were: Northern Ireland 62%, England 58%, Wales 53%. In 1984 the Secondary Examinations Council decided to replace the norm referencing with criteria referencing, where 16+ and 18+ grades would in future be awarded on Examiner Judgement, the change being implemented, at O-Level, in June 1986. In the final year DES statistics were available 6.8% achieved an A and 39.8% an A-C grade.

O-levels incorporated an element of negative marking, with marks deducted for incorrect answers, poor spelling, grammar or handwriting.

The table below gives rough equivalences between O-Level, CSE and GCSE grades, including changes to GCSE grades in 1994 and the 2010s:

For GCSE Mathematics from 1988 there was an extension paper allowing candidates to achieve 3 grades higher than an A (pass, merit, and distinction). This was stopped.

Approximate equivalences for GCSE, O-Level and CSE grades
National Cohort	GCSE Grade				O-Level Grade	CSE Grade
%'ile	England from 2017 ^{a}	Northern Ireland from 2019 ^{b}	Wales from 1994; England, NI 1994–2019 ^{c}	1988–1993	1975–1987 ^{d}	1965–1987
5%	9	A*	A*	A	A	1
15%	8	A	A*	A	B	1
15%	8	A	A	B	C	1
25%	7	A	A	B	D	2
40%	6	B	B	C	E	2
55%	5	C*	B	D	E	2
55%	5	C*	C	D	U	3
70%	4	C	C	E	U	4
85%	3	D	D	F	U	5
95%	2	E	E	G	U	U
95%	2	F	F	U	U	U
98%	1	F	F	U	U	U
98%	1	G	G	U	U	U
98%	U	U	U	U	U	U

- Notes:
  - GCSE grades 9 to 4 (A* to C) – Certificate and qualification awarded. At GCSE, considered a 'standard pass', and awards a qualification at Level 2 of the RQF.
  - GCSE grades 3 to 1 (D to G) – Certificate and qualification awarded. At GCSE, awards a qualification at Level 1 of the RQF.
  - U: ungraded/unclassified – no certificate or qualification awarded
  - ^a 9–1 grades phased in by subject between 2017 and 2019 in England
  - ^b New A*–G grades in Northern Ireland from 2019
  - ^c A*–G grades as used in Wales since 1994, and in England and Northern Ireland between 1994 and 2019
  - ^d Before 1975, each exam board had its own grading system (some used letters, others numbers). Grades were only given to schools and not recorded on students' certificates

== Entrants ==
The 1978 Waddell Report, when comparing O-Level and CSE entrants stated: "the O Level examination tending to be aimed at the upper 20 per cent of the full ability range and CSE catering for the next 40 per cent." This conclusion is partially supported by the statistics. After 1976, for subjects where an equivalent O-level paper existed, approximately 36% of the pupils entered for either exam sat the O-Level; the remainder (64%) sat the CSE paper. The proportion taking CSE exams increased following the raising of the minimum school-leaving age to 16, in 1973, and the subsequent fall in the proportion sitting neither exam e.g.

English O-Level and CSE Mathematics entrants 1976-9
Year	Pupils	Numbers of maths candidates			% Maths papers		% Pupils entered for maths
Year	Pupils	O-Level	CSE	Total	O-Level	CSE	% Pupils entered for maths
1974	–	–	–	–	–	–	74
1976	–	270,297	377,731	631,927	42.8	57.2	–
1977	751,070	217,560	392,020	609,580	35.7	64.3	81.1
1978	768,460	230,660	414,950	645,610	35.7	64.3	84.0
1979	781,240	245,500	438,220	683,720	35.9	64.1	87.5

== Exam boards ==
The O-Level syllabi, examinations and awards were made by 9 independent boards: Associated Examining Board, Durham University Examinations Board (dissolved 1964), Joint Matriculation Board, Oxford and Cambridge, Oxford, Southern, Cambridge, London, and Welsh Joint Education Committee.

Unlike CSE examinations, the participating schools had a choice of syllabi and awarding body, and were not required to use a designated local board.

== Later developments ==
The O-level qualifications in England, Wales and Northern Ireland, alongside the AO-Level and CSE were replaced by the General Certificate of Secondary Education (GCSE). The GCSE was first announced in 1984, phased in by 1986 with a couple of subjects, and completed for all subjects the following year. By the 1988 exam sittings, the GCSE had officially replaced the O-level, with the last O-levels sat in 1987 in certain subjects. The O-level brand is still used in many Commonwealth countries, such as Bangladesh, Mauritius, Sri Lanka, and Singapore, instead of or alongside the IGCSE qualifications. The Hong Kong Certificate of Education Examination was also benchmarked against the O-levels for comparable subjects. But it has switched to benchmark against the IGCSE. The School Certificate of Mauritius continues to use the O-level exams.

O-levels continue to be used as international qualifications for students in other countries, who use them for preparation for advanced study in their own country and/or access higher education overseas..

== See also ==
- Certificate of Secondary Education (CSE)
- General Certificate of Education (GCE), which comprises O Levels and A levels
  - GCE Ordinary Level (International) (O Level), for the use of O Levels in other countries
  - GCE Advanced Level (A Level)
- General Certificate of Secondary Education (GCSE), which replaced the O Levels and CSE
- School Certificate predecessor to the GCE O Level and CSE qualifications
