= Certificate of Secondary Education =

Former academic qualification in England, Wales, and Northern Ireland

The Certificate of Secondary Education (CSE) was a subject-specific qualification family awarded in both academic and vocational fields in England, Wales and Northern Ireland. CSE examinations were held in the years 1965 to 1987. This qualification should not be confused with the Indian Certificate of Secondary Education which is a school-leaving qualification in India. Also, in some African and former British colonial countries (such as, Kenya) there is a qualification named the Certificate of Secondary Education based on the original and former British variant. Also, the CSE should not be confused with the African qualification CSEE (Certificate of Secondary Education Examination).

== CSE ==
The 1960 Beloe Report was commissioned to look into a new exam which became the CSE.

The CSE was introduced to provide a set of qualifications available to a broader range of schoolchildren and distinct from the GCE (O-Levels), that were aimed at the more academically-able pupils, mostly those at grammar and independent schools (rather than secondary modern schools). CSEs were available in both academic and vocational subjects, incorporated controlled assessment in addition to examination, and examination questions were typically offered in a shorter and more structured form than those found on an equivalent O-Level paper.

Before the introduction of the CSE, the majority of schoolchildren at secondary modern schools did not take externally set end of school examinations, and so left school without any nationally recognised qualifications. Though the introduction of the CSE did not, of itself, resolve the issue as the majority still left at the end of the fourth year without sitting an external qualification. By the late 1960s and early 1970s, some counties had introduced their own examinable qualifications for those leaving at the end of the fourth year. For example, the county of Monmouthshire in Wales awarded the Monmouthshire Certificate in Education.

The majority of secondary modern pupils continued to leave without qualifications until the raising of the school leaving age to 16, in 1973, made a fifth year of secondary education compulsory.

A number of GCE and CSE exam boards experimented with offering a combined O-Level and CSE examination, in the 1970s, for borderline candidates. The papers contained questions limited to areas of the syllabus that were common to both an O-Level and CSE.

The range of courses for CSE was wider than that for the O-level and included many vocational subjects, such as car maintenance, which were not available at O-level. As comprehensive schools gradually replaced secondary modern schools, pupils could increasingly take a mixture of CSEs and O-levels until finally the examinations were merged with the new GCSE certification courses.

CSEs and O-levels are the predecessor examinations of the General Certificate of Secondary Education (GCSE).

== Grading ==
There were five pass grades in its grading system ranging from grades 1 to 5. A CSE grade 1 was equivalent to achieving an O level grade of C or higher, in the same subject, while a 4 was obtainable by someone of average / median ability. Gaining a CSE Grade 1 implied that the student could have followed an O level course in that subject. This often caused frustration for such pupils wishing to progress to A-level, who (due to incompatibilities in the syllabi) would need to take a 1-year O-level conversion course in the Lower Sixth and thus waste a year gaining a qualification they theoretically already held.

Though no formal requirements existed, grades 2 to 3 were possibly set to be equivalent to the two (D and E) lowest O-Level pass grades.

Approximate equivalences for GCSE, O-Level and CSE grades
National Cohort	GCSE Grade				O-Level Grade	CSE Grade
%'ile	England from 2017 ^{a}	Northern Ireland from 2019 ^{b}	Wales from 1994; England, NI 1994–2019 ^{c}	1988–1993	1975–1987 ^{d}	1965–1987
5%	9	A*	A*	A	A	1
15%	8	A	A*	A	B	1
15%	8	A	A	B	C	1
25%	7	A	A	B	D	2
40%	6	B	B	C	E	2
55%	5	C*	B	D	E	2
55%	5	C*	C	D	U	3
70%	4	C	C	E	U	4
85%	3	D	D	F	U	5
95%	2	E	E	G	U	U
95%	2	F	F	U	U	U
98%	1	F	F	U	U	U
98%	1	G	G	U	U	U
98%	U	U	U	U	U	U

- Notes:
  - GCSE grades 9 to 4 (A* to C) – Certificate and qualification awarded. At GCSE, considered a 'standard pass', and awards a qualification at Level 2 of the RQF.
  - GCSE grades 3 to 1 (D to G) – Certificate and qualification awarded. At GCSE, awards a qualification at Level 1 of the RQF.
  - U: ungraded/unclassified – no certificate or qualification awarded
  - ^a 9–1 grades phased in by subject between 2017 and 2019 in England
  - ^b New A*–G grades in Northern Ireland from 2019
  - ^c A*–G grades as used in Wales since 1994, and in England and Northern Ireland between 1994 and 2019
  - ^d Before 1975, each exam board had its own grading system (some used letters, others numbers). Grades were only given to schools and not recorded on students' certificates

Percentage of School-Leavers in England obtaining 'n' O-level (A-C) or CSE grade 1 pass
individual awards	0	1	2	3	4	5	6	7	8+	1 or more	5 or more
1982	10.6	11.4	6.8	5.0	4.4	4.4	4.5	4.5	12.7	52.6	26.1
1983	9.6	11.4	7.0	5.3	4.7	4.3	4.5	4.7	12.8	53.8	26.2

== Entrants ==
The 1978 Waddell Report, when comparing O-Level and CSE entrants stated: "the O Level examination tending to be aimed at the upper 20 per cent of the full ability range and CSE catering for the next 40 per cent", is partially supported by the statistics. For subjects where an equivalent O-level paper existed approximately 36% of the pupils entered for either exam, after 1976, sat the O-Level, the remainder (64%) sat the CSE paper. The proportion taking CSE exams increased following the raising of the minimum school leaving age to 16, in 1973, and the subsequent fall in the proportion sitting neither exam e.g.

English O-Level and CSE Mathematics entrants 1976-9
Year	Pupils	O-Level Maths Candidates	CSE Maths Candidates	Total Candidates	% Maths Papers: O-Level	% Maths Papers: CSE	% Pupils entered for Maths
1974	–	–	–	–	–	–	74
1976	–	270,297	377,731	631,927	42.8	57.2	–
1977	751,070	217,560	392,020	609,580	35.7	64.3	81.1
1978	768,460	230,660	414,950	645,610	35.7	64.3	84
1979	781,240	245,500	438,220	683,720	35.9	64.1	87.5

== Exam Boards ==
The CSE syllabi, examinations and awards were originally made by 15 independent regional boards:

- Associated Lancashire Schools Examining Board
- East Anglian Examinations Board
- East Midland Regional Examinations Board
- Metropolitan Regional Examination Board
- Middlesex Regional Examination Board
- Northern Ireland Schools Examination Council
- North Regional Examinations Board
- North West Regional Examinations Board
- South-East Regional Examinations Board
- South Western Examinations Board
- Southern Regional Examination Board
- Welsh Joint Education Committee
- West Midlands Regional Examination Board
- The West Yorkshire and Lindsey Regional Examining Board
- Yorkshire Regional Examinations Board

In 1979, the neighbouring Metropolitan and Middlesex boards merged to form the London Regional Examinations Board. The West Yorkshire and Lindsey and Yorkshire and Humberside boards also merged to form the Yorkshire and Humberside Regional Examinations Board in 1982.

Unlike GCE and GCSE examinations, the participating schools did not have a choice of awarding body, but were required to use the designated local board. Unlike the GCE and GCSE boards, the CSE exam boards were composed of elected teachers and local authority representatives from each region.

== See also ==
- GCE Ordinary Level (International) (O-Level)
  - GCE Ordinary Level (United Kingdom)
  - Ordinary Level (Sri Lanka)
  - Cambridge International Ordinary Level (Singapore)
  - Cambridge International O-Level subjects
- General Certificate of Secondary Education (GCSE), which replaced the O Levels and CSE
  - International General Certificate of Secondary Education (IGCSE), which is offered with or instead of O Levels internationally
- General Certificate of Education (GCE), which comprises O Levels and A-levels
- School certificate (SC), predecessor to the GCS O-Level and CSE qualifications
  - School Certificate (United Kingdom)
  - School Certificate (New South Wales)
  - School Certificate (New Zealand)
