= GCSE =

British educational qualifications

General Certificate of Secondary Education
- Acronym: GCSE
- Type: Prerequisite to a school leaving certificate
- Skills tested: Varies depending on subject, but in almost all GCSE subjects, general knowledge, fundamental writing, numerical skills, deep analysing and thinking skills are tested.
- Year started: 1988
- Score range: England: Grades from 9 to 1, with 9 being the highest, while a U being the lowest obtainable result; Wales: Grades from A* to G, with A* being the highest; Northern Ireland: Grades from A* to G, with A* being the highest. There is also a C* grade
- Restrictions on attempts: All units for a single subject must be taken in one examination series. Only the first attempt of a student is recorded for school league table purposes, but students may take a subject as many times as they like.
- Regions: England, Wales and Northern Ireland
- Languages: English, Irish ^{a} and Welsh ^{b}
- Fee: Free to students in schools. Resits and private entries incur variable fees.
- ^a Irish-medium exams are only available in Northern Ireland, from the CCEA exam board.^b Welsh-medium exams are only available in Wales, from the WJEC exam board.

The General Certificate of Secondary Education (GCSE) is an academic qualification in a range of subjects taken in England, Wales, and Northern Ireland. It was introduced in September 1986 and its first exams were taken in 1988. Most schools in Scotland use the Scottish Qualifications Certificate instead. However, a few private schools choose to follow the English GCSE system.

Each GCSE qualification is offered as a specific school subject, with the most commonly awarded being English literature, English language, mathematics, science (combined and triple), history, geography, religious studies, art, design and technology (D&T), business studies, music, physical education, computer science and modern foreign languages (e.g. Spanish, French, German) (MFL).

The Department for Education has drawn up a list of core subjects known as the English Baccalaureate for England based on the results in eight GCSEs, which includes both English language and English literature, mathematics, science (physics, chemistry, biology, which are a part of the separate science course (or triple science), computer science), geography or history and an ancient or modern foreign language. English language and mathematics are the two GCSEs that you must get a passing grade in (a 4) and in exceptional circumstances – such as extreme illness – it has been known for students to take only these two, however it severely limits the subjects they can take as A levels.

Studies for GCSE examinations take place over a period of two or three academic years (depending upon the subject, school and exam board). They usually start in Year 9 or Year 10 for the majority of pupils, with around two mock exams – serving as a simulation for the actual tests – normally being sat during the first half of Year 11 and the final GCSE examinations nearer to the end of spring, in England and Wales. (Note: In Northern Ireland they start in Year 11 and examinations are sat either at the end of that year or at the end of Year 12, since Northern Irish schools begin numbering years with pupils aged 4 to 5 as Year 1 (rather than Reception as in England and Wales). The GCSE was introduced as an amalgam of the former O-Level (General Certificate of Education Ordinary Level) and CSE (Certificate of Secondary Education) qualifications.)

== History ==
Before the introduction of GCSEs, pupils took the Certificate of Secondary Education (CSE) or the more academically challenging GCE Ordinary Level exams or a combination of the two, in various subjects. The CSE broadly covered GCSE grades C–G or 4–1 and the O-Level covered grades A*–C or 9–4, but the two were independent qualifications, with different grading systems. The separate qualifications were criticised for disadvantaging the bottom 42% of O-Level entrants, who failed to receive a qualification, and the highest-achieving CSE entrants, who had no opportunity to demonstrate higher ability.

In their later years O-Levels were graded on a scale from A to E, with a U (ungraded) below that. Before 1975 the grading scheme varied between examination boards, but typically there were pass grades of 1 to 6 and fail grades of 7 to 9. However, the grades were not displayed on certificates. Before grades were introduced, actual percentage marks were given, to the nearest 5%, the pass mark being 45%.

The CSE was graded on a numerical scale from 1 to 5, with 1 being the highest and 5 the lowest passing grade. Below 5 there was a U (ungraded) grade. The highest grade, 1, was considered equivalent to an O-Level C grade or above, and achievement of this grade often indicated that the pupil could have taken an O-Level course in the subject to achieve a higher qualification. As the two were independent qualifications with separate syllabi, a separate course of study would have to be taken to convert a CSE to an O-Level in order to progress to A-level.

There was a previous attempt to unite these two disparate qualifications in the 1980s, with a trial ‘16+‘ examination in some subjects, awarding both a CSE and an O-Level certificate, before the GCSE was introduced. The final O-level/CSE examinations were sat in 1987.

=== Introduction of the GCSE ===
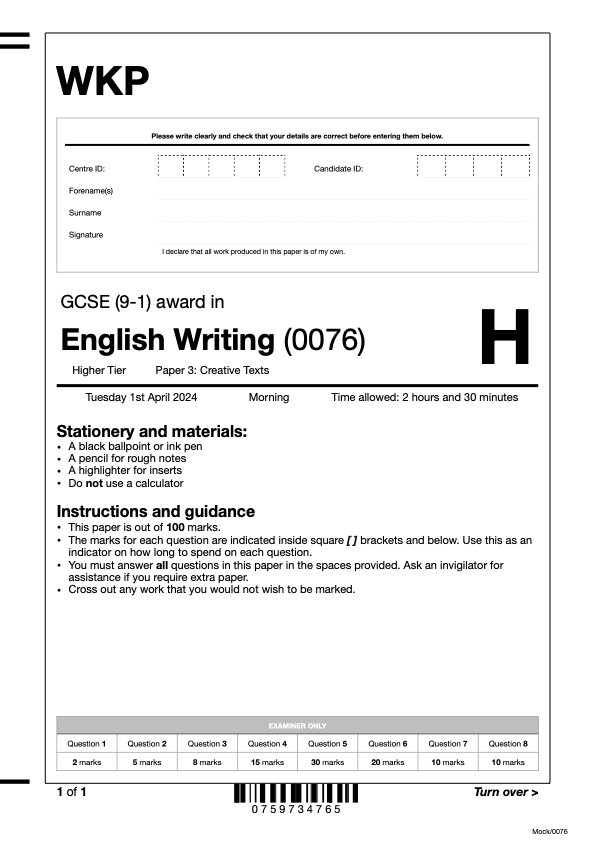
Mockup of the front of a GCSE exam paper

GCSEs were introduced in September 1986 to establish a national qualification for those who decided to leave school at 16 without pursuing further academic study towards qualifications such as A-levels or university degrees. The first GCSE exams were sat in 1988. They replaced the former CSE and O-Level qualifications, uniting the two qualifications to allow access to the full range of grades for more pupils. However, the exam papers of the GCSE sometimes had a choice of questions, designed for the more able and the less able candidates.

When introduced the GCSEs were graded from A to G, with a C being set as roughly equivalent to an O-Level Grade C or a CSE Grade 1 and thus achievable by roughly the top 25% of each cohort.

The Royal Alexandra & Albert School in Reigate, Surrey, trialled GCSE English in 1980. Those who passed would receive both a CSE and an O-Level certificate. There was still a separate English Literature O-Level exam.

=== Changes since initial introduction ===
Over time the range of subjects offered, the format of the examinations, the regulations, the content and the grading of GCSE examinations have altered considerably. Numerous subjects have been added and changed and various new subjects are offered in modern languages, ancient languages, vocational fields and expressive arts, as well as citizenship courses.

==== Introduction of the A* grade ====
In 1994 the A* grade was added above the grade A to further differentiate attainment at the very highest end of the qualification. This remained the highest grade available until 2017, when numerical grades were introduced (see below). The youngest pupil to gain an A* grade was Thomas Barnes, who earned an A* in GCSE Mathematics at the age of 7.

==== Mathematics tiers ====
Initially the mathematics papers were divided between three tiers: higher (able), intermediate (less able) and foundation (near unable), to cover different mathematical abilities. The higher level corresponded to grades A–C, the intermediate level to grades C–E, and the foundation level to grades E–G. However, it was later realised that students who sat the foundation level exam could not pass the subject at grade C, so this system was replaced by a two-tier arrangement whereby the intermediate and foundation levels were merged. This brought the subject into line with other subjects that typically had foundation and higher-level papers. This meant that somebody who sat the new foundation level could now achieve a grade C and thus pass.

With the introduction of numbered grades, the higher tier provides grades 9–3, with 3 being classed as a "safety net" grade, and the foundation tier provides grades 5–1.

==== 2000s reforms ====
Between 2005 and 2010, a variety of reforms were made to GCSE qualifications, including increasing modularity and a change to the administration of non-examination assessment.

From the first assessment series in 2010, controlled assessment replaced coursework in various subjects, requiring more rigorous exam-like conditions for much of the non-examination-assessed work and reducing the opportunity for outside help in coursework.

==== 2010s reforms ====
Under the Conservative government of David Cameron, various changes were made to GCSE qualifications taken in England. Before a wide range of reforms, interim changes were made to existing qualifications, removing the January series of examinations as an option in most subjects and requiring that 100% of the assessment in subjects from the 2014 examination series be taken at the end of the course. These were a precursor to the later reforms.

From 2015, a large-scale programme of reform began in England, changing the marking criteria and syllabi for most subjects as well as the format of qualifications and the grading system.

Under the new scheme, all GCSE subjects were revised between 2015 and 2018 and all new awards were to be on the new scheme by summer 2020. The new qualifications are designed such that most exams will be taken at the end of a full two-year course, with no interim modular assessment, coursework nor controlled assessment except where necessary (such as in the arts). Some subjects retain coursework on a non-assessed basis, with the completion of certain experiments in science subjects being assumed in examinations and teacher reporting of spoken language participation for English GCSEs as a separate report.

Other changes include the move to a numerical grading system to differentiate the new qualifications from the old-style letter-graded GCSEs, publication of core content requirements for all subjects and an increase in longer, essay-style questions to challenge pupils more. Alongside this a variety of low-uptake qualifications and qualifications with significant overlap will cease, with their content being removed from the GCSE options or incorporated into similar qualifications. A range of new GCSE subjects was also introduced for pupils to study from 2017, 2018, 2019, and 2020.

GCSE examinations in English and mathematics were reformed with the 2015 syllabus publications, with these first examinations taking place in 2017. The remainder were reformed with the 2016 and 2017 syllabus publications, leading to first awards in 2018 and 2019 respectively.

For GCSE Science, the old single-award "science" and "additional science" options are no longer available, being replaced with a double award "combined science" option (graded on the scale 9–9 to 1–1 and equivalent to 2 GCSEs). Alternatively, pupils can take separate qualifications in chemistry, biology and physics. Other removed qualifications include a variety of design technology subjects, which are reformed into a single "design and technology" subject with several options, and various catering and nutrition qualifications, which are folded into "food technology". Finally, several "umbrella" GCSEs such as "humanities", "performing arts" and "expressive arts" are dissolved, with those wishing to study those subjects needing to take separate qualifications in the incorporated subjects.

==== Implications for Wales and Northern Ireland ====
These reforms did not apply immediately in Wales and Northern Ireland, where GCSEs would continue to be available on the A*–G grading system. However, owing to legislative requirements for comparability between GCSEs in the three countries and allowances for certain subjects and qualifications to be available in Wales and Northern Ireland, some 9–1 qualifications were to be available and the other changes were mostly adopted in these countries as well.

In Northern Ireland, a decision was taken by Minister of Education, Peter Wier (DUP), in 2016 to align the A* Grade to the 9 Grade of the English reformed qualifications. The first award of the new A* grade was in 2019. A C* grade was also introduced in Northern Ireland to align to the 5 grade in England, again with first awarding in 2019. GCSEs in Northern Ireland remain modular and Science practicals can count towards the overall grade. Speaking and listening also remains a component of the GCSE English Language specification.

==== VCSE in Wales ====
A new brand of vocational qualifications, called VCSEs, will be introduced in Wales from September 2027.

Subjects taught under this new qualification will be:

- Built Environment
- Creative and Media Production, and Technology
- Engineering
- Hospitality and Catering
- Performing Arts
- Public Services
- Retail and Customer Service
- Sport and Leisure
- Travel and Tourism

== Examination boards ==
Historically, there was a variety of regional examination boards, or awarding organisations (AOs), which set examinations in their area. The five examination boards include:

- Assessment and Qualifications Alliance (AQA), which absorbed the following boards: AEB, JMB, NEAB, and SEG.
- Cambridge OCR (formerly Oxford, Cambridge and RSA Examinations), which absorbed the Oxford Delegacy of Local Examinations, Cambridge Local Examinations, Oxford & Cambridge Examinations Board, MEG, and RSA exam boards.
- Pearson Edexcel, which absorbed the LREB, BTEC, and ULEAC boards.
- Welsh Joint Education Committee (WJEC or CBAC), the main examining board in Wales.
- Council for the Curriculum, Examinations and Assessment (CCEA), the examining board and regulator in Northern Ireland.

The examination boards operate under the supervision of Ofqual (the Office of Qualifications and Examinations Regulation) in England, Qualifications Wales in Wales, and the CCEA in Northern Ireland.

In England, AQA, OCR, and Edexcel operate under their respective brands. Additionally, WJEC operates the brand Eduqas, which develops qualifications in England. CCEA qualifications are not available in England.

In Wales, WJEC is the only accredited awarding body for GCSEs in the public sector, and thus no other board formally operates in Wales. However, some qualifications from the English boards are available as designated qualifications in some circumstances, due to not being available from WJEC.

In Northern Ireland, CCEA operates as both a board and a regulator. Most qualifications from the English boards are also available, with the exception of English language and the sciences, owing to requirements for speaking and practical assessment, respectively.

== Structure and format ==
Pupils usually take 7–11 GCSEs in Key Stage 4. The exact qualifications taken vary from school to school and pupil to pupil but all schools are encouraged to offer a pathway that leads to qualification for the English Baccalaureate, requiring GCSEs in English literature, English language, mathematics, science (including computer science), a modern foreign or ancient language and history or geography.

=== Subjects ===
The list of currently available GCSE subjects is much shorter than before the reforms, since the new qualifications in England all have core requirements set by the regulator, Ofqual, for each subject. In addition, there are several subjects for which only one board offers qualifications, including some that are available in only one country of the UK for that reason. The following lists are sourced from the exam board websites.

==== Core subjects ====
These are the requirements for achieving the English Baccalaureate headline measure in league tables, from 2017 onwards. Other subjects, especially religious studies, citizenship studies, computer science and physical education are compulsory in the majority of secondary schools since these subjects form part of the National Curriculum at Key Stage 4. However, they are not compulsory after finishing Key Stage 3, or until GCSE content is officially introduced into the curriculum; in some schools it is introduced in Year 9.

- English
  - English Language and English Literature
- Mathematics
- Science
  - Sciences (Biology, Chemistry, Physics and Computer Science) or Combined Science
- Languages: one GCSE in a modern or ancient language
  - Modern languages: Arabic, Bengali, Chinese (Cantonese), Chinese (Mandarin), French, German, Modern Greek, Gujarati, Modern Hebrew, Irish (only in Northern Ireland), Italian, Japanese, Panjabi, Persian, Polish, Portuguese, Russian, Spanish, Turkish, Urdu, Welsh (only in Wales)
  - Ancient languages: Classical Greek, Biblical Hebrew, Latin
- Humanities:
  - History or Geography (or both)

==== Other subjects ====
- Sciences and Mathematics
  - Astronomy
  - Geology
  - Psychology
  - Statistics
- Humanities and Social Sciences:
  - Ancient History
  - Citizenship Studies
  - Classical Civilisation
  - Religious Studies
  - Sociology
- Business and Enterprise:
  - Business Studies
  - Economics
- Design and Technology:
  - Design and Technology
  - Electronics
  - Engineering
  - Computer Science
  - Food Preparation and Nutrition
- Arts:
  - 3D Design
  - Art, Craft and Design (also known as Art and Design)
  - Dance
  - Drama
  - Film Studies
  - Fine Art
  - Graphic Communication
  - Media Studies
  - Music
  - Photography
  - Textiles
- Other:
  - Physical Education

==== Northern Ireland additional subjects (CCEA) ====
- Agriculture and Land Use
- Business and Communication Systems
- Child Development
- Construction and the Built Environment
- Contemporary Crafts
- Digital Technology
- Further Mathematics
- Government and Politics
- Health and Social Care
- Home Economics
- Hospitality
- Irish
  - Irish
  - Gaeilge
- Journalism in the Media and Communications Industry
- Learning for Life and Work
- Leisure, Travel and Tourism
- Motor Vehicle and Road User Studies
- Moving Image Arts
- Short Course Religious Studies

==== Wales additional subjects (WJEC/CBAC) ====
- Information and Communication Technology
- Digital Technology (teaching from 2026)
- English Language and Literature (Single or Double Award)
- Digital Media and Film (teaching from 2026)
- Health and Social Care and Childcare (teaching from 2026)
- Mathematics – Numeracy (Double Award)
- Mathematics and Numeracy
- Physical Education and Health (teaching from 2026)
- Social Studies (teaching from 2026)
- Applied Science (integrated Single or Double Award)
- Welsh (compulsory in Welsh schools):
  - Cymraeg Language and Literature (first language)
  - Core Cymraeg (Second Language)

=== Grades and tiering ===
GCSEs are awarded on a graded scale and cross two levels of the Regulated Qualifications Framework (RQF): Level 1 and Level 2. These two levels roughly correspond, respectively, to foundation and higher tier in tiered GCSE qualifications. Level 1 qualifications constitute GCSEs at grades G, F, E, and D or 1, 2, and 3. Level 2 qualifications are those at grades C, B, A, and A* or 4, 5, 6, 7, 8, and 9.

The tiering of qualifications allows a subset of grades to be reached in a specific tier's paper. Formerly many subjects were tiered, but with the mid-2010s reform the number of tiered subjects reduced dramatically, including the removal of tiering from the GCSE English specifications. Untiered papers allow any grade to be achieved. Coursework and controlled assessment tasks are always untiered.

In the past mathematics qualifications offered a different set of tiers, with three. These were foundation tier at grades G, F, E, and D; intermediate tier at grades E, D, C, and B; and higher tier at grades C, B, A, and A*. This eventually changed to match the tiers in all other GCSE qualifications.

The evolution of grades and a rough comparison between them are as follows:

Approximate equivalences for GCSE, O-Level and CSE grades
National Cohort	GCSE Grade				O-Level Grade	CSE Grade
%'ile	England from 2017 ^{a}	Northern Ireland from 2019 ^{b}	Wales from 1994; England, NI 1994–2019 ^{c}	1988–1993	1975–1987 ^{d}	1965–1987
5%	9	A*	A*	A	A	1
15%	8	A	A*	A	B	1
15%	8	A	A	B	C	1
25%	7	A	A	B	D	2
40%	6	B	B	C	E	2
55%	5	C*	B	D	E	2
55%	5	C*	C	D	U	3
70%	4	C	C	E	U	4
85%	3	D	D	F	U	5
95%	2	E	E	G	U	U
95%	2	F	F	U	U	U
98%	1	F	F	U	U	U
98%	1	G	G	U	U	U
98%	U	U	U	U	U	U

- Notes:
  - GCSE grades 9 to 4 (A* to C) – Certificate and qualification awarded. At GCSE, considered a 'standard pass', and awards a qualification at Level 2 of the RQF.
  - GCSE grades 3 to 1 (D to G) – Certificate and qualification awarded. At GCSE, awards a qualification at Level 1 of the RQF.
  - U: ungraded/unclassified – no certificate or qualification awarded
  - ^a 9–1 grades phased in by subject between 2017 and 2019 in England
  - ^b New A*–G grades in Northern Ireland from 2019
  - ^c A*–G grades as used in Wales since 1994, and in England and Northern Ireland between 1994 and 2019
  - ^d Before 1975, each exam board had its own grading system (some used letters, others numbers). Grades were only given to schools and not recorded on students' certificates

==== Letter grades ====
When GCSEs were introduced in 1988 they were graded on a letter scale in each subject: A, B, C, D, E, F and G being pass grades, with a U (unclassified) below that, which did not qualify the pupil for a certificate. These grades were initially set such that a GCSE grade C was equivalent to an O-Level grade C or a CSE grade 1, though changes in marking criteria and boundaries over the years mean that this comparison is only approximate.

Infrequently, X and Q grades are awarded. X indicates that a course was not completed and therefore an appropriate grade cannot be calculated. The Q (query) grade is a temporary grade that requires the school to contact the examining body. These two grades are usually provisional and are replaced with a normal grade once any issues have been resolved. X grades are also sometimes used for other purposes on rare occasions, such as to indicate that an examiner found offensive material or hate speech within a pupil’s answers. In some cases this may lead to the pupil losing all marks for that paper or course. These grades are most common in subjects that cover ethical issues, such as biology, religious studies and citizenship.

In 1994 an A* grade was added above the initial A grade to indicate exceptional achievement, above the level required for the A grade.

Under the letter grade scheme, foundation tier papers assess content at grades C to G, while higher tier papers assess content at grades A* to C. In foundation-tier papers, pupils can obtain a maximum grade of a C, while in a higher-tier paper they can achieve a minimum grade of a D. Higher-tier candidates who miss the D grade by a small margin are awarded an E. Otherwise the grade below E in these papers is U. In untiered papers pupils can achieve any grade in the scheme. This scheme has been phased out in England, but remains in Wales and Northern Ireland. In Northern Ireland the A* grade has been adjusted upwards with the introduction of the numerical scheme in England, such that an A* is equivalent to a new English grade 9. Northern Ireland also added a C* grade to line up with the grade 5 in the English grading. Pupils in Northern Ireland studying for GCSEs with any of the English exam boards are awarded grades based on the 9–1 system as opposed to the A*–G system.

==== Numerical grades (2017 onwards) ====
Since 2017 in England (and in Wales and Northern Ireland on qualifications from the English-based awarding bodies) most GCSEs have been assessed on a nine-point scale, using numbers from 9 to 1, and a U (unclassified) grade for achievement below the minimum pass mark. Under this system 9 is the highest grade and is set above the former A* classification, equivalent to the new Northern Irish A* grade. A grade 8 is also equivalent to an A*; however, the grade 9 is the top end of the A*. The former C grade is set at grade 4 (known as a "standard pass") and grade 5 (considered a "strong pass") under the numerical scheme.

Although fewer qualifications have tiered examinations than before, the tiering system still exists. At foundation tier the grades 1, 2, 3, 4 and 5 are available, whilst at higher tier the grades 4, 5, 6, 7, 8 and 9 are targeted. Students who take the higher tier and miss the grade 4 mark by a small margin are awarded a grade 3. Controlled assessment and coursework tasks are untiered. The youngest person known to have achieved a grade 9 is Ellie Barnes, who achieved the grade in Mathematics aged eight.

==== Results ====
Infographic from Ofqual showing statistics about GCSE entries in 2016. 5.24 million people took a GCSE in that year.

GCSE results are published by the examination board in August for the exam series in April to June of the same year. They are usually released one week after the A-Level results, on the Thursday that falls between 20 August and 26 August. The examination results are released to centres (schools) prior to the release to candidates and the public. Examination results are released by the Joint Council for Qualifications (JCQ), which represents the main GCSE awarding organisations. Some boards and schools release results online, although many still require pupils to attend in person to collect their results from the centre at which they sat the exams.

In England these results then go on to inform league tables published in the following academic year, with headline performance metrics for each school. Owing to COVID-19, pupils who were supposed to sit their GCSEs in 2020 and 2021 were awarded qualifications based on predicted grades from their teachers. Traditional exams, however, have been taken since the summer of 2022.

==== 1988–2018 ====
Grades awarded (percentage)
	A*	A	B	C	D	E	F	G	U	A*+A	A*–C	entries
1988	—N/a	8.4	12.8	20.7	19.3	16.6	12.5	6.3	3.4	8.4	41.9	5,230,047
1989	—N/a	9.9	13.8	21.9	19	15.8	11.2	5.6	2.9	9.9	45.6	5,132,998
1990	—N/a	10.8	14.4	22.5	18.7	15.3	10.6	5.2	2.5	10.8	47.7	5,016,547
1991	—N/a	11.4	14.7	22.4	18.6	15	10.5	5.3	2.2	11.4	48.5	4,947,593
1992	—N/a	12.3	15.3	22.9	18.6	14.7	9.9	4.7	1.6	12.3	50.5	5,028,554
1993	—N/a	12.5	15.9	23.1	18.6	14.2	9.3	4.4	1.8	12.5	51.5	4,968,634
1994	2.8	10.2	18	21.8	18.7	13.7	9.3	4.1	1.5	13	52.8	5,029,599
1995	3.2	9.9	17.8	22.1	18.6	14	9	3.9	1.5	13.1	53	5,431,625
1996	3.4	10.3	18	22.3	18.6	13.4	8.7	3.8	1.5	13.7	54	5,475,872
1997	3.6	10.5	18.1	22.3	18.7	13.3	8.5	3.6	1.5	14.1	54.4	5,415,176
1998	4.1	10.6	16.5	23.6	18.6	13.2	7.6	3.5	2.3	14.7	54.8	5,353,095
1999	4.4	10.8	16.9	23.7	18.7	12.7	7.5	3.3	2	15.2	55.8	5,374,751
2000	4.6	11.2	17	23.8	18.4	12.5	7.2	3.2	2.1	15.8	56.6	5,481,920
2001	4.9	11.2	16.9	24.1	18.3	12.1	7.1	3.3	2.1	16.1	57.1	5,632,936
2002	5	11.4	17.4	24.1	18.1	12	6.7	3.2	2.1	16.4	57.9	5,662,382
2003	5.1	11.6	17.3	24.1	17.7	11.7	6.8	3.3	2.4	16.7	58.1	5,733,487
2004	5.6	11.8	17.3	24.5	17.3	11.3	6.6	3.2	2.4	17.4	59.2	5.875,373
2005	5.9	12.5	18	24.8	17.3	10.5	6	2.8	2.2	18.4	61.2	5,736,505
2006	6.3	12.8	18.3	25	17.3	10.2	5.6	2.6	1.9	19.1	62.4	5,752,152
2007	6.4	13.1	18.6	25.2	17.2	9.8	5.3	2.4	2	19.5	63.3	5,827,319
2008	6.8	13.9	19.8	25.2	16.6	9.1	4.7	2.3	1.6	20.7	65.7	5,669,077
2009	7.1	14.5	19.9	25.6	16.5	8.5	4.4	2.1	1.4	21.6	67.1	5,469,260
2010	7.5	15.1	20.6	25.9	15.9	7.8	4	1.9	1.3	22.6	69.1	5,374,490
2011	7.8	15.4	21.7	24.9	15.1	7.8	4.1	2	1.2	23.2	69.8	5,151,970
2012	7.3	15.1	21.7	25.3	15.9	7.7	4.1	1.9	1	22.4	69.4	5,225,288
2013	6.8	14.5	21.5	25.3	16.6	8	4.1	2	1.2	21.3	68.1	5,445,324
2014	6.7	14.6	21.9	25.6	16.3	7.6	3.8	2.0	1.5	21.3	68.8	5,217,573
2015	6.6	14.6	22.1	25.7	16.4	7.6	3.7	1.9	1.4	21.2	69	5,277,604
2016	6.5	14.0	21.4	25.0	16.9	8.3	4.2	2.1	1.6	20.5	66.9	5,240,796
2017	7.1	14.2	20.6	23.5	16.8	9.3	4.7	2.3	1.5	21.3	65.3	3,694,771
2018	7.0	14.7	21.8	23.4	15.2	8.5	4.5	2.7	2.2	21.7	66.9	860,246

Source: Joint Council for General Qualifications via Brian Stubbs.
Note: In the final year DES statistics for O-Levels are available, and across all subjects, 6.8% of candidates obtained a grade A, and 39.8% achieved grades A to C.

===== 2018–present =====
Grades awarded (percentage)
England
	9	8	7	6	5	4	3	2	1	U	9–7	9–4	entries
2018	4.3	6.5	9.5	13.2	16.8	16.6	17.6	9.5	4.4	1.6	20.3	66.9	4,609,830
2019	4.5	6.7	9.4	13.4	16.6	16.4	17.3	9.5	4.5	1.7	20.6	67.0	5,070,481
2020	6.3	8.1	11.5	14.8	17.4	17.8	14.2	6.8	2.7	0.4	25.9	75.9	5,214,030
2021	7.4	9.1	12.0	14.5	17.1	16.8	12.1	6.8	3.2	1.0	28.5	76.9	5,236,858
2022	6.6	8.5	10.9	14.7	17.4	14.9	13.0	8.5	4.0	1.6	26.0	73.0	5,219,550
2023	4.9	7.1	9.6	14.0	16.6	15.6	16.0	9.3	4.9	2.0	21.6	67.8	5,422,613
2024	5.0	7.1	9.6	13.6	16.6	15.5	16.3	9.3	5.0	2.0	21.7	67.4	5,677,940
2025	5.1	7.1	9.6	13.6	16.5	15.2	16.6	9.3	4.9	2.1	21.8	67.1	5,661,686
2026	5.0	7.3	9.5	13.8	16.3	14.9	16.9	9.2	4.9	2.0	21.8	67.0	5,719,431
Wales
	A*	A	B	C	D	E	F	G	U		A*+A	A*–C	entries
2018	6.1	12.0	19.0	24.1	16.6	9.8	5.1	3.6	3.7		18.1	61.2	268,435
2019	6.1	11.8	19.6	24.9	15.8	9.7	5.5	3.8	2.8		17.9	62.4	289,502
2020	10.8	14.1	22.3	26.1	14.0	6.7	3.3	2.3	0.4		24.9	73.3	296,002
2021	13.5	14.7	22.0	23.1	12.0	7.0	3.5	1.7	1.5		28.2	73.3	322,712
2022	10.8	13.9	20.3	23.2	13.0	8.1	4.7	3.3	2.7		24.7	68.2	304,582
2023	8.7	12.6	19.6	23.6	14.0	9.0	5.4	3.9	3.2		21.3	64.5	293,368
2024	6.5	12.2	19.7	23.3	15.0	10.0	5.8	4.1	3.4		18.7	61.7	309,170
2025	6.6	12.5	19.5	23.6	15.1	9.7	5.8	4.1	3.1		19.1	62.2	300,846
2026	6.7	12.5	19.3	23.5	15.4	9.5	5.8	4.1	3.2		19.2	62.0	282,376
Northern Ireland
	A*	A	B	C*	C	D	E	F	G	U	A*+A	A*–C	entries
2019	8.1	23.3	20.0	16.2	14.1	9.3	4.3	2.2	1.2	1.3	31.4	81.7	140,065
2020	12.4	24.6	23.5	13.7	15.2	5.9	2.8	1.1	0.5	0.3	37.0	89.4	140,840
2021	14.9	25.6	21.5	13.3	13.8	5.1	2.9	1.3	0.7	0.9	40.5	89.1	144,755
2022	12.6	25.2	24.1	17.5	10.4	5.1	2.5	1.2	0.8	0.6	37.8	89.8	142,617
2023	10.6	24.8	22.1	16.8	12.3	7.2	3.2	1.6	0.8	0.6	35.4	86.6	145,250
2024	8.3	23.4	20.1	16.1	14.1	9.4	4.1	2.3	1.3	0.9	31.7	82.0	152,369
2025	8.5	23.8	20.3	16.4	13.9	8.8	3.9	2.1	1.3	1.0	32.3	82.9	150,454
2026	8.4	24.0	20.1	16.5	14.1	8.8	3.8	2.0	1.4	0.9	32.4	83.1	150,952

=== Assessment types ===
==== Modular and linear GCSEs ====
In the past, many GCSE qualifications used a modular system, where some assessment (up to 60% under the "terminal rule") could be submitted prior to the final examination series. This allowed for students to take some units of a GCSE before the final examination series, and thus gave indication of progress and ability at various stages, as well as allowing for students to resit exams in which they did not score as highly, in order to boost their grade, before receiving the qualification. Various qualifications were available as both modular and linear schemes, and schools could choose whichever fit best for them.

Under the Conservative government of David Cameron, reforms were initiated which converted all GCSEs from 2012 (for assessment from 2014) to de facto linear schemes, in advance of the introduction of new specifications between 2015 and 2018 (for first assessment from 2017 to 2020). These new rules required that 100% of the assessment in a GCSE be submitted in the final examination series, at the same time as applying for certification of the full qualification. The examination boards complied by modifying the syllabi of the remaining GCSE qualifications to remove modular components.

==== Coursework and controlled assessment ====
In some subjects, one or more controlled assessment or coursework assignments may also be completed. These may contribute either a small or large proportion of the final grade. In practical and performance subjects, they generally have a heavier weighting to reflect the difficulty and potential unfairness of conducting examinations in these areas.

In the past, these were available in a variety of subjects, including extended writing in English, the sciences, business, and foreign languages; practical assessment in the sciences and technology subjects; and speaking assessments in languages. Since the 2010s reform, the availability has been cut back, with mostly only design and technology subjects and performing arts retaining their controlled assessment contributions. In English language, the spoken language assessment has been downgraded to an endorsement which is reported separately on the English certificate, not contributing to the grade. The English spoken language assessments are set throughout the course and assessed by teachers. Students may be awarded a Pass, Merit, Distinction or Not Classified. In the sciences, practical exercises are a required part of the qualification, but are not directly assessed; they are only endorsed by a teacher's statement.

The balance between controlled assessment and examinations is contentious, with the time needing to be set aside for coursework sessions being seen as a burden on the school timetable. However, the use of controlled assessment allows for the marking of some work outside of examination season, and can ease the burden on students to perform well on the day of the examination.

=== Exceptional and mitigating circumstances ===
For pupils with learning difficulties, an injury/repetitive strain injury (RSI) or a disability, help is offered in these forms. These may not necessarily be diagnosed, depending on the context.

- Extra time: the amount depends on the severity of the learning difficulty, such as dyslexia, disability, injury or learning in English as a second language provided that the pupil has been studying in the UK for no more than 2 years. This tends to range from 5% to 50%, although most commonly is at 25%. To qualify for 25% extra time, a student must show evidence of at least 2 below average standardised scores of 84 or less, or one below average (84 or less) and one low average standardised score (between 85 and 89). Extra time may also be provided to students with an EHCP (Education, Health, and Care Plan), provided that it has necessary evidence to show this could be required. Students are not required to use all of this time, and are allowed to finish the exam at any point during the extra time.
- Amanuensis: somebody (typically known as a scribe) types or handwrites as the pupil dictates; this is normally used when the pupil cannot write owing to an injury or disability. This can be quite strict – students have to dictate correct punctuation. This requires centre-based evidence from the SENDCo of the school.
- A word processor (typically Exam Write-Pad): this is used by pupils who have trouble writing legibly or who are unable to write quickly enough to complete the exam. This must be the student's typical or one of their typical ways of working and requires centre-based evidence.
- A different format exam paper – examples of this may include Braille for students with visual impairment, colour pointers for students who have colour blindness of some form, large print for those with visual impairment, and different coloured paper (typically blue) for those with dyslexia. This requires only centre-based evidence, as a student without these difficulties would not benefit from these formats.
- A reader: a teacher or exam invigilator can read out the words in the exam paper, but they cannot explain their meaning. This is used most often with severely dyslexic students who cannot read questions effectively enough, and is commonly used in conjunction with amanuensis, as most students requiring this will lack writing ability as well.
- A different room: owing to evidence from the centre, students may be placed in small rooms. This most commonly occurs in cases of rest breaks and extra time, where students will finish later than other candidates, and have this so as to not be disturbed by most students leaving the exam before them. All exam rooms are covered by separate dedicated invigilators.
- Rest breaks: these are optional breaks requiring centre-based evidence as the student's normal way of working. A student with rest breaks does not need a diagnosis of a disability, and is often used for medical reasons such as migraines which prevent students from focusing for periods of time, and anxiety attacks, meaning a students may not be able to work for periods of time. Students typically receive rest breaks at a ratio of 1:6 with exam time. These breaks may be taken only within this time, and cannot exceed it. Students receive the time they spent in the rest break back through a later finish time and are not required to take all of the allocated rest break time.

Any of the above must be approved by the examination board. Other forms of help are available with the agreement of the examination board, but the above are the most common.

If a student is ill or an unforeseen circumstance occurs that may affect their performance in an examination, they can apply for special consideration from the examination board. The procedures vary depending on how much the student has completed, but in the case of sitting an examination, they may receive a percentage increase on their grade to reflect this, or a consideration of their coursework and other assessment alongside their predicted grades, to calculate a fair grade based on their other attainment.

== Progression ==
GCSEs and other Level 2 qualifications are generally required in order to pursue Level 3 qualifications, such as A-Levels or BTEC (Business and Technology Education Council) beyond the age of 16.

The requirement of 5 or more 9–4 grades, including English, Mathematics and Science is often a requirement for post-16 qualifications in sixth form colleges and further education colleges after leaving secondary school.

Most universities, in addition to their post-16 requirements, seek that their candidates have grades of 4 or higher in GCSE English, Mathematics and Science. Many of those who achieve below this standard will later retake GCSEs to improve their grade and results. The November examination series exists for this purpose, to allow a faster path to gain these grades than waiting until the following summer's main series. Leading universities often take into account performance at GCSE level, sometimes expecting applicants to have a high proportion of top grades.

== Comparison with other qualifications ==
=== Within the UK ===
==== England, Wales and Northern Ireland ====
GCSEs in England, Wales, and Northern Ireland are part of the Regulated Qualifications Framework. A GCSE at grades G, F, E, D, 1, 2, or 3 is a Level 1 qualification. A GCSE at C, B, A, A*, 4, 5, 6, 7, 8, or 9 is a Level 2 qualification. Qualifications are not awarded to grades U, X or Q. Level 2 qualifications are much more sought-after, and generally form minimum requirements for jobs and further study expectations.

The BTEC is another Level 1/2 qualification available in the same territories as the GCSE, and is graded at 5 levels. At Level 2, comparable to A*, A, B, and C respectively are the Distinction*, Distinction, Merit, and Pass. A BTEC at Level 1 is simply marked as "Level 1", with no subdivision. Below that level, a U is awarded, as in GCSEs. Other qualifications at this level include Cambridge Nationals, Key Skills, and Functional Skills.

Some schools in the UK choose to enter their students for IGCSE examinations.

==== Scotland ====
The comparable qualifications in Scotland are the National 4 and National 5 awards (formerly Standard Grades and/or Intermediates).

=== Outside the UK ===
The international version of the GCSE is the IGCSE, which can be taken anywhere in the world and includes additional options relating to coursework and the language the qualification is pursued in. All subjects completed in the fifth of the European Baccalaureate are generally equivalent to the GCSE subjects.

==== Current and former British territories ====
The education systems of current and former British territories, such as Gibraltar, and Nigeria, also offer the qualification, as supplied by the same examination boards. Other former British colonies, such as Singapore and Zimbabwe, continue to use qualifications called O-levels.

==== Ireland ====
In the Republic of Ireland, the Junior Certificate is a comparable qualification.

United States

In the United Kingdom, the academic level of a US high school diploma is often considered comparable to GCSE-level completion (Year 11).

France

The Diplôme National du Brevet (previously Brevet des Collèges) is generally considered to be comparable to four GCSEs. The Brevet is usually sat in troisième (or year 10 in England and Wales).

== Criticism ==
=== Grade disparity ===
Statistics released by London's Poverty Profile found overall GCSE attainment in London to be greater than the rest of England. 39% of pupils in Inner London and 37% in Outer London did not get five GCSEs at A* to C, compared with 42% in the rest of England. Also, according to an ITV News report, UK students tend to outperform Jersey students on GCSE examinations. Gender bias is another area of concern. Department of Education data shows that the relative performance gap between girls and boys widened under GCSEs, compared with O-Levels.

=== Grade inflation ===
When the GCSE system was introduced, there were comments that it was a dumbing down of the previous GCE O-Level system (as it took the focus away from the theoretical side of many subjects, and taught pupils about real-world implications and issues relating to ICT and citizenship).

In addition, the proportions of candidates awarded high grades at GCSE have been rising for many years, which critics attribute to grade inflation. By comparing pupils' scores in the YELLIS ability test with their GCSE results over a period of about 20 years, Robert Coe found a general improvement in grades awarded which ranges from 0.2 (science) to 0.8 (maths) of a GCSE grade. Only slightly more than half of pupils sitting GCSE exams achieve the 5 A* to C grades required for most forms of academic further education.

One of the important differences between previous educational qualifications (and the earlier grading of A-Levels) and the later GCSE qualifications was supposed to be a move from norm-referenced marking to criterion-referenced marking. In a norm-referenced grading system, fixed percentages of candidates achieve each grade. With criterion-referenced grades, in theory, all candidates who achieve the criteria can achieve the grade. A comparison of a clearly norm-referenced assessment, such as the NFER Cognitive Ability Test or CAT, with GCSE grading seems to show an unexpected correlation, which challenges the idea that the GCSE is a properly criterion-based assessment.

=== Mental health ===
Senior school leaders, the NSPCC, and Childline have expressed concern that GCSEs in their current exam-only format are too stressful and will lead to mental health crises. Students in 2019 were subjected to more exams and spent longer in the exam hall than their 2016 counterparts. While a GCSE student in 2016 had an average of 18 exams to prepare for, totalling 24 hours and 30 minutes, the average examinee in 2019 sat 22 exams, totalling 33 hours.

The Association of School and College Leaders (ASCL) surveyed 606 headteachers from schools that had entered pupils for exam-only GCSEs. They found reports of panic attacks, sleepless nights, depression, extreme fatigue, self-harming, and suicidal thoughts.

Effects encountered owing to exam-only GCSE format 2017–18
Effect	Number of headteachers reporting effect (%)	Percentage of sample reporting problems
Panic attacks	460 (75.9%)	84.2%
Sleepless nights	457 (75.4%)	83.7%
Depression	394 (65.0%)	72.2%
Extreme fatigue	344 (56.8%)	63.0%
Self-harming	340 (56.1%)	62.3%
Suicidal thoughts	216 (35.6%)	39.6%
Sample reporting problems	546 (90.1%)	100.0%

Even before all GCSE qualifications adopted the exam-only format, students complained about the memorization load, the need to write continuously for long hours, how their social lives have been affected and the need for sleeping pills and painkillers. They have observed younger siblings starting to panic about the exams at the beginning of the course- not just in the final year or the final few months.

=== Social divide ===
The incorporation of GCSE awards into school league tables, and the setting of targets at school level at above national average levels of attainment, has been criticised. At the time of introduction, the E grade was intended to be equivalent to the CSE grade 4, and so obtainable by a candidate of average/median ability. Sir Keith Joseph set schools a target of 90% of their pupils obtaining at least a grade F (which was the "average" grade achieved in the past). This target was reached nationally about 20 years later. David Blunkett went further and set schools the goal of 50% of 16-year-olds gaining 5 GCSEs or equivalent at grade C and above, although these grades were previously obtained by only the top 30%. This was achieved with the help of equivalent and largely vocational qualifications. Labelling schools as failing if 40% of their pupils do not achieve at least 5 Cs, including English and Maths at GCSE, has also been criticised, as it essentially requires 40% of each intake to achieve the grades obtained by only the top 20% when GCSE was introduced.

The extent of the switching away from the terminal exam only GCSE to the IGCSEs in public and private schools was revealed in answers to a parliamentary question posed by Labour MP Lucy Powell in November 2018. The option to choose to do so is no longer open to state schools since the introduction of the new GCSEs graded 9-1.

Michael Gove, the architect of these reformed examinations, said in 2009: "Denying IGCSEs in core subjects to children in state schools will only serve to increase the level of inequality in education''.

=== Errors and mistakes ===
Teachers and pupils have the option to question exam results and have the scripts marked again if they feel the grade awarded does not reflect the pupil's ability and expectations; or if they review a copy of the script and notice a marking error. In recent years, there have been complaints that GCSEs and GCE A-Levels were marked unfairly. (In 2012, for the first time in the history of the exams, the proportion of all GCSEs awarded an A*–C grade fell).

This can be seen as, in general, more appeals being submitted each year; however, the appeals rarely result in any grade changes as only 182 out of 6.2 million (0.003%) grades were changed in England in 2018, with most upheld appeals ending in no change of marks.

In one incident concerning the 2016 GCSE biology exam, there were complaints about the apparent lack of biology content in the exam. One of the questions in the biology exam asked students to define an "independent company", which some students perceived to be a business studies question.

The May 2017 English literature exam (under the regulation of OCR) wrongly implied that Tybalt, a character in Romeo and Juliet, was not a Capulet. This serious flaw in the question confused many of the students. OCR accepted responsibility and claimed no pupil would be disadvantaged. The question was worth 40 marks, a relatively large number of marks.

In 2022, advance information was given by examination boards to students, providing them with information on what topics would or would not be on the exam. However, in the Physics paper 1 exam, a topic that was stated as "Not Assessed" came up; AQA accepted the mistake and awarded all students the full 9 marks to the question. Also in 2022, a question on one of the higher Maths papers was leaked hours before students sat them. The exam board Edexcel apologised and conducted a full investigation.

=== Cancellations ===
In 2020, as a result of the COVID-19 pandemic, GCSE examinations, along with all other May and June exams that year were cancelled. The government announced that GCSE and A-level grades would be awarded through teachers' assessments based on mock exams, coursework and other available evidence, moderated by a statistical standardisation model developed by Ofqual. This is the first cancellation of GCSEs since they were introduced.

An algorithm for deciding grades was originally introduced by Ofqual, which got used for A-Level grades. However, this caused backlash, causing the government to ultimately replace the algorithm with Center Assessed Grades for GCSEs on 17 August.

In 2021, GCSEs, along with A-level and AS exams, were cancelled again owing to the pandemic and replaced with teacher assessed grades. The grades were decided based on previous mock exams, homework, classwork, and optional examinations set by Ofqual.

=== Calls for reform and abolition ===
Support for scrapping GCSEs in England has increased because of the COVID-19 pandemic. Rethinking Assessment was established in September 2020 to call for assessment reform in secondary education, including scrapping GCSEs. Members include multi-academy trusts including the Academies Enterprise Trust and Bohunt Academy Trust, independents schools including Eton College, Bedales School and St Paul's Girls' School, and Lord Baker of Dorking, the Conservative who introduced GCSEs as education secretary in 1986.

In 2021, former Conservative prime minister John Major led calls by him and eight former education secretaries, both Conservative and Labour, for GCSEs to be scrapped and replaced, reformed or reviewed. Former education secretaries who called for them to be scrapped included Lord Baker, Lord Blunkett and Alan Johnson, while those calling for changes, reforms or a review included Major and former education secretaries Baroness Morgan of Cotes, Justine Greening, Charles Clarke and Ruth Kelly. Former Labour schools minister David Miliband also called for them to be scrapped, as did Conservative MP Robert Halfon, who chaired the Education Select Committee in the House of Commons between 2017 and 2022. Support for scrapping GCSEs also came from teaching unions, including the National Education Union which is the largest teaching union in the country, and a group of centrist one-nation Conservative MPs. Schools Minister Nick Gibb rejected the proposal, thinking that "it would be a huge mistake to abolish the tried and tested GCSEs".

In 2022, former Labour prime minister Tony Blair called for GCSEs and A-Levels to be scrapped and replaced by a new qualification and an examination based on the International Baccalaureate. Before the age of 16, pupils would be assessed through pupil assessment. From 16 to 18, they would be assessed continually on their subject knowledge and skills through multiple methods including examination, which would determine their final grade. Blair declined enacting a similar proposal when he was prime minister.

== In popular culture ==
The 2006 novel Wicked! A Tale of Two Schools by Jilly Cooper features character Rupert Campbell-Black take on a bet that he cannot pass GCSE English.

== See also ==
- International General Certificate of Secondary Education (IGCSE), which is offered internationally as well as in some schools in the UK
- GCE Advanced Level; commonly referred to as "A-Levels", a set of exams that many pupils take after completing GCSEs that are more academically rigorous
- Business and Technology Education Council; referred to as "BTECs", another set of exams many pupils take after completing GCSEs in vocational subjects
- Predecessor qualifications to the GCSE:
  - GCE Ordinary Level (O-Levels)
  - Certificate of Secondary Education (CSE)
  - School Certificate
- General Certificate of Education (GCE), which comprises O-Levels and A-Levels
