= School Certificate (United Kingdom) =

British educational qualification standard

The United Kingdom School Certificate was an educational attainment standard qualification, established in 1918 by the Secondary Schools Examinations Council (SSEC).

The School Certificate Examination (often called the "Junior Certificate" or "Juniors") was usually taken at age 16. Performance in each subject was graded as: Fail, Pass, Credit or Distinction. Students had to gain six passes, including English and Mathematics, to obtain a certificate. To obtain a "matriculation exemption" one had to obtain at least a credit in five subjects, including English, Mathematics, Science and a language. Those who failed could retake the examination. Some students who passed then stayed on at school to take the Higher School Certificate (often called the "Senior Certificate" or "Seniors") at age 18.

The School Certificate was abolished after the GCE O-Level was introduced in 1951. The School Certificate also existed in a number of Commonwealth countries such as Australia and Singapore at various times.

== See also ==
- School Certificate (New South Wales)
- School Certificate (New Zealand)
- School Certificate (Mauritius)
- School Certificate - Other variants: Zambia, Nigeria
- Higher School Certificate (United Kingdom)
- GCE Ordinary Level (International) (O-Level)
  - GCE Ordinary Level (United Kingdom)
  - Cambridge International Ordinary Level (Singapore)
  - Cambridge International O-Level subjects
- Certificate of Secondary Education (CSE)
  - Certificate of Secondary Education (United Kingdom) (CSE)
- General Certificate of Secondary Education (GCSE), which replaced the O-Levels and CSE
  - International General Certificate of Secondary Education (IGCSE), which is offered with or instead of O-Levels internationally
- General Certificate of Education (GCE), which comprises O-Levels and A-levels
