= Pearson Edexcel =

British multinational education and examination body owned by Pearson

- Formation: 1996; 30 years ago
- Merger of: ULEAC and BTEC
- Type: Examination board
- Headquarters: Strand, London, England
- Official language: English
- Chair: Mary Curnock Cook CBE
- Parent organisation: Pearson plc
- Website: qualifications.pearson.com

Pearson Edexcel (previously known as Edexcel) is a British multinational education and examination body formed in 1996 and wholly owned by Pearson plc since 2005. It is the only privately owned examination board in the United Kingdom. Its name is a portmanteau term combining the words education and excellence.

Edexcel regulates school examinations under the British Curriculum and offers qualifications for schools on the international and regional scale. It is the UK's largest awarding organisation offering academic and vocational qualifications in schools, colleges and work places in the UK and abroad. It is also recognised internationally. In 2019, Edexcel was the focus of significant controversy following a leak of an A-level examination.

== History ==
Edexcel was formed in 1996 by the merger of two bodies, the BTEC (Business & Technology Education Council) and ULEAC (University of London Examinations and Assessment Council). In 2003, the Edexcel Foundation (the charity that managed the board) formed a partnership with Pearson plc to set up a new company called London Qualifications Ltd, which was 75% owned by Pearson and 25% by the Edexcel Foundation. London Qualifications Limited changed its name to Edexcel Limited in November 2004, with Pearson plc buying out the remaining 25% in 2005, making Edexcel the only large examination board to be held in private hands.

Edexcel also offer International GCSE and A Level qualifications, only available to schools outside of the UK. It is considered by the UK NARIC (the National Recognition Information Centre for the United Kingdom) to be of a comparable standard to their UK equivalent qualifications. In addition, Edexcel offers the Edexcel International Diploma (ID) which involves the study of 4 International A-Levels (3 full A-Levels and 1 AS-Level in either General Studies or Global Development). Edexcel International qualifications are amongst the most taught at International Schools along with the curricula offered by Cambridge International Examinations and the International Baccalaureate Organization.

On 3 April 2013, Pearson rebranded Edexcel as 'Pearson Edexcel', in line with a name change that added the prefix 'Pearson' to all of its brands. Aside from NVQ and Functional Skills, the Edexcel name is now only used for Pearsons' academic GCSE and A Level qualifications and their international counterparts. The Edexcel name was dropped from the majority of their vocational offerings including all BTEC qualifications, now known as 'Pearson BTEC'.

=== Incorporated examination boards ===
- Business Education Council (BEC)
- Business and Technology Education Council (BTEC)
- East Anglian Examinations Board (EAEB) – partial
- Joint Committee for Business Studies and Public Administration (JCBSPA)
- London East Anglia Group (LEAG)
- London Regional Examining Board (LREB) – created in 1979
  - Metropolitan and Middlesex Regional Examining Boards (M&MREB) – created in 1979
    - Metropolitan Regional Examination Board (MREB)
    - Middlesex Regional Examination Board (MREB)
- Technician Education Council (TEC)
- University Entrance and Schools Examinations Council (UESEC)
- University of London Examinations and Assessment Council (ULEAC)
- University of London Schools Examination Board (ULSEB)

== Controversies ==
As Edexcel is the only privately owned examination board in the UK, questions have been raised on whether the examination board is acting in the best interest of students, or solely as a profit making business, due to the wide range of Edexcel-endorsed text books published by Pearson, the international multi-billion company which owns the board.

=== 2007 ===
In 2007 it was reported that teachers using Edexcel Music examinations were allowing students to listen to confidential listening paper CDs several days before the examination, by abusing the trust given by the exam board to only check for technical issues. Other exam boards do not allow the practice of checking discs, with AQA specifically instructing teachers not to open the packages containing the CDs before exams.

=== 2013 ===
In 2013, the loss of an A-Level Mathematics Core 3 exam paper being delivered to an international school in Amsterdam led to a replacement paper being published for the Summer examination series. However, 60 students took the original paper due to it mistakenly being handed out in two UK and two overseas centres, while the replacement paper was taken by 34,000 students. The replacement paper was criticised for its unusually high difficulty level, and there were concerns that the students taking the original paper would be unfairly marked.

=== 2015 ===
==== Difficulty ====
In June 2015, students across the United Kingdom who had taken an Edexcel GCSE Maths paper expressed anger and confusion over questions that "did not make sense" and were "ridiculous", mocking the exam on Twitter. On a Sky News segment, presenter Adam Boulton answered one of the paper's 'hardest' questions with a former maths teacher. As a result, GCSE students across the UK signed a petition made by a candidate requesting that the exam board lowers the grade boundaries as the examination was considered too hard.

==== Gender representation ====
An additional petition was started by a 17-year-old student requesting to "Ensure the representation of women on the A-Level Music syllabus." The petition asks that music composed by women be added to the Edexcel A-Level Music syllabus which "has a total of 63 different set works from a variety of musical genres and eras." After six days, the petition had over 1,800 signatures and was featured in The Guardian.

=== 2019 ===
==== Question duplication ====
In June, the GCSE Mathematics Higher Tier Paper 3 exam appeared to contain a question which was published in an AQA (another British exam board) Level 2 Further Mathematics textbook. The exam question had the same diagram, values and answer as the question in the textbook. Pearson Edexcel said that they were investigating how this might have happened.

==== Exam difficulty concerns from students ====
After students sat Paper 2 of the new specification A-Level Mathematics, many students complained online expressing that the difficulty of the exam was too high and unlike anything seen in past papers. One online petition to lower grade boundaries was signed by thousands of users. Before results day, Pearson Edexcel released a video addressing students about the difficulty concerns and mentioned that independent experts did confirm that the exam was "fair and valid". They acknowledged the first two questions of the exam were more difficult than anticipated, and also claimed that they would make "small adjustments" to "improve the experience" of the exam for future students.

==== Leak ====
Further controversy ensued after Paper 3 of the new specification A-Level Mathematics (9MA0/03 – sat 14 June), appeared to have been accessed by someone who, late in the night before the exam sitting, posted on Twitter that they would sell a copy of the exam paper for £70. Pearson Edexcel launched an investigation after becoming aware that some scribbled out images of the exam paper were circulated online prior the exam sitting, and found one centre (out of thirty-eight possible suspect centres in one geographic location), who were visited at a very short notice, to have committed a serious and "possibly criminally motivated" security breach of the paper.

Students expressed frustration about the incident; BBC News reported that students believed the incident could have the potential to affect their results. Pearson Edexcel stated that they have "well-established processes to ensure fair and accurate results" and that "grade boundaries will not be affected". On 17 June Edexcel stated that the compromised questions could be removed from the overall assessment, as well as undertaking additional statistical analysis to identify irregular result patterns for particular centres or students.

About 60,000 students were affected in this incident. Two men aged 29 and 32 were arrested on 24 June on suspicion of theft. The men were released under investigation while inquiries continued. Ahead of results day, it was revealed that 78 students who were suspected of being at an advantage from malpractice would have their results withheld. This is the largest number of candidates to be withheld results from a single malpractice incident. No news report on the charge or conviction status after the arrest went to the press.

==== Extremely low A-level Mathematics grade boundaries ====
After a leak of the A-Level grade boundaries ahead of results day, it emerged that in order to pass the new A-Level Mathematics specification, candidates needed to score 14% (43 marks out of 300) to pass. OCR (another British exam board) also had similarly low grade boundaries. After these extremely low grade boundaries added flavour to many news headlines, Ofqual said that they were confident the grade boundaries this year were "sound", shifting their focus onto the previous year's grade boundaries for the 2,000 students who sat the new A-Level specification for the first time in 2018 after studying for one year. Ofqual said "We want to understand why the grade boundaries were so different between the two years.", and had called the significant shifts in boundaries "unusual".

None of the exam boards decided to re-open the 2018 award, after being asked to look at them again by the regulator.
