= Examination board =

Set of people who judge exams, oppositions or other similar calls

An examination board (or exam board) is an organization that sets examinations, is responsible for marking them, and distributes the results. Some are run by governmental entities; some are run as not-for-profit organizations.

== International exam boards ==
- International Baccalaureate (IB)
- Cambridge International Education International General Certificate of Secondary Education (IGCSE)
- Edexcel

== Pan-regional exam boards ==
- The Caribbean Examinations Council administers various examinations across the Anglophone Caribbean
- The West African Examinations Council administers the WASSCE

== National exam boards by country ==
=== Australia ===
Examinations in Australia are set by individual state authorities:

- In Victoria, examinations are set by the Victorian Curriculum and Assessment Authority.
- In South Australia, examinations are set by the SACE Board of SA, which also administers the South Australian Matriculation in certain schools in Malaysia and China.
- In New South Wales, examinations are set by the New South Wales Education Standards Authority.

=== Bangladesh ===
Nine education boards organize four national levels of examinations under the control of Ministry of Education:

- PEC (class 5)
- JSC (class 8)
- SSC (secondary)
- HSC (higher secondary)

There are two more alternative education boards in Bangladesh, namely the Bangladesh Madrasah Education Board and the Bangladesh Technical Education Board.

Students are admitted to colleges based on the results of the SSC. After the HSC, students are admitted into universities by qualifying in admission tests.

The British Council Bangladesh offers International English Language Testing System (IELTS) exams, and other international exams.

=== Cameroon ===
The Cameroon GCE Board administers GCE O and A Level examinations.

=== China ===
The National Education Examinations Authority (NEEA; Chinese: 教育部教育考试院) under the Ministry of Education is mainly responsible for major education examinations, including overseas examination and gaokao in Mainland China.

The Hong Kong Examinations and Assessment Authority is responsible for the Hong Kong Diploma of Secondary Education examination.

=== India ===
In India, the Council of Boards of School Education (COBSE) is an association of all the national, regional and international education boards, under the Ministry of Education.

==== National-level exam boards ====
- Central Board of Secondary Education (CBSE)
- National Institute of Open Schooling (NIOS)
- Council for the Indian School Certificate Examinations (CISCE)
- National Testing Agency conducts various National entrance exam and national level college or university level exam

==== State-level exam boards ====
Andhra Pradesh

- Board of Intermediate Education, Andhra Pradesh
- Board of Secondary Education, Andhra Pradesh
- A.P. Open School Society

Assam

- Assam Higher Secondary Education Council
- Board of Secondary Education, Assam
- Assam Sanskrit Board
- Assam State Open School (ASOS)

Bihar

- Bihar School Examination Board
- Bihar Board of Open Schooling & Examination (BBOSE)
- Bihar Sanskrit Shiksha Board
- Bihar State Madrasa Education Board

Chhattisgarh

- Chhattisgarh Board of Secondary Education
- Chhattisgarh State Open School

Delhi

- Delhi Board of Secondary Education

Goa

- Goa Board of Secondary and Higher Secondary Education

Gujarat

- Gujarat Secondary and Higher Secondary Education Board

Haryana

- Board of School Education Haryana

Himachal Pradesh

- Himachal Pradesh Board of School Education

Jharkhand

- Jharkhand Academic Council

Karnataka

- Karnataka Secondary Education Examination Board
- Department of Pre-University Education, Karnataka
- Karnataka Open School

Kerala

- Kerala Board of Public Examinations
- Kerala Board of Higher Secondary Examinations
- Kerala State Open School (State Council for Open and Lifelong Education, Kerala)

Madhya Pradesh

- Madhya Pradesh Board of Secondary Education
- Madhya Pradesh State Open School Education Board

Maharashtra

- Maharashtra State Board of Secondary and Higher Secondary Education
- Maharashtra State Open School

Manipur

- Council of Higher Secondary Education, Manipur
- Board of Secondary Education, Manipur

Meghalaya

- Meghalaya Board of School Education

Mizoram

- Mizoram Board of School Education

Nagaland

- Nagaland Board of School Education

Odisha

- Board of Secondary Education, Odisha
- Council of Higher Secondary Education, Odisha

Punjab

- Punjab School Education Board

Rajasthan

- Rajasthan Board of Secondary Education
- Rajasthan State Open School

Sikkim

- Sikkim Board of Open Schooling and Examination

Tamil Nadu

- Tamil Nadu State Board of School Examination
- Tamil Nadu Open School Society

Telangana

- Telangana State Board of Intermediate Education
- Board of Secondary Education, Telangana
- Telangana Open School Society

Tripura

- Tripura Board of Secondary Education

Uttar Pradesh

- Uttar Pradesh State Board of High School and Intermediate Education
- Uttar Pradesh State Open School Board

Uttarakhand

- Uttarakhand Board of School Education

West Bengal

- West Bengal Board of Secondary Education
- West Bengal Council of Higher Secondary Education

==== Other recognized exam boards ====
- Banasthali Vidyapith
- Bhartiya Shiksha Board, Haridwar
- Rajiv Gandhi University of Knowledge Technologies (RGUKT), Telangana
- Sanskrit Education Boards
- Madarasa Boards like Aligarh Muslim University Secondary Education Board

=== Ireland ===
In Ireland, exams are run through one main examination board called the State Examinations Commission (SEC). This exam board provides examinations for secondary school level students, including Junior Certificate/Junior Cycle for students aged 14-16 and Leaving Certificate/Leaving Cert Applied (LCA) examinations for students aged 17-19.

Examinations from the SEC are available in both the Irish and English languages.

The Irish SEC Leaving Certificate is also examined at The International School of the Martyrs (ISM) in Tripoli, Libya. The examination in Libya is available to students in Arabic.

=== Malaysia ===
Examinations in Malaysia are set by Examination Syndicate (Lembaga Peperiksaan Malaysia) under the supervision of Malaysia's Ministry of Education.

The Examination Syndicate provide Sijil Pelajaran Malaysia (SPM) examinations locally for all the states in Malaysia. The SPM certificate is taken by all Malaysian students at the age of 17 and in Form 5 except those are studying in some international schools. The SPM certificate is equivalent to a Cambridge O-Level certificate.

The Malaysian Examination Council (MPM) is providing Sijil Tinggi Pelajaran Malaysia (STPM) examination to all Form 6 students in Malaysia. The STPM certificate is equivalent to a Cambridge A-Level certificate.

The Malaysian Examination Council (MPM) also providing Malaysian English University Test (MUET) for all the Malaysian students to maintain the students' English proficiency level. All Malaysian students must take MUET examination and their achievement level is one of the main criteria for them to pursue their studies in any degree program under government and private universities in Malaysia.

=== Malta ===
The Matriculation and Secondary Education Certificate (MATSEC) Examinations Board was established in 1991 by the Senate and the Council of the University of Malta. It has task to develop examination system for UK examination boards of GCE Ordinary and Advanced level examinations.

=== Philippines ===
The Professional Regulation Commission sets exams in the Philippines.

=== Poland ===
There is one state run central system of examination boards in Poland called "Centralna Komisja Egzaminacyjna" ("Central Examination Board") established within the new legislation on education issued by Polish parliament in 1998. The central board has eight regional branches called "Okręgowa Komisja Egzaminacyjna" (OKE) – "Regional Examination Board". All primary and secondary schools and other education institutions in a region are served by the regional OKE. Universities are not part of that system. It is allowed by law to sit an exam in other regional board than the home one, but practically it does not happen.

Each OKE is responsible for the content and administration of the entrance tests to primary schools, Gymnasiums and secondary schools in accordance to the Ministry of Education annual guidelines. Final secondary school examination called Matura (analogous to A Levels) is prepared each year by the Ministry of Education and administered by regional examiners, who are recruited, trained and paid by regional OKE boards. Each regional OKE has an authority to issue an official certificate of an examination.

Nr	OKE	Voivodeship
1.	OKE Gdańsk	Pomeranian
1.	OKE Gdańsk	Kuyavian–Pomeranian
2.	OKE Jaworzno	Silesian
3.	OKE Kraków	Lesser Poland
3.	OKE Kraków	Subcarpathian
3.	OKE Kraków	Lublin
4.	OKE Łomża	Podlaskie
4.	OKE Łomża	Warmian–Masurian
5.	OKE Łódź	Łódź
5.	OKE Łódź	Świętokrzyskie
6.	OKE Poznań	Greater Poland
6.	OKE Poznań	West Pomeranian
6.	OKE Poznań	Lubusz
7.	OKE Warsaw	Masovian
8.	OKE Wrocław	Lower Silesian
8.	OKE Wrocław	Opole

=== Singapore ===
- Singapore Examinations and Assessment Board, which is a statutory board under the Ministry of Education (MOE) of Singapore.

=== United Kingdom ===
==== England, Wales and Northern Ireland ====
The members of this list all provide A-Level and GCSE qualifications:

- AQA (England, Wales and Northern Ireland)
- CCEA (Northern Ireland only)
- Pearson Education (England, Wales and Northern Ireland)
- Cambridge OCR (England, Wales and Northern Ireland)
- WJEC (England, Wales and Northern Ireland)
- Cambridge International Education (international only – not a regulated awarding organisation in the UK)

==== Scotland ====
Qualifications Scotland administer Advanced Higher, Higher and National qualifications in Scotland

=== United States ===
Primary and secondary school tests are generally administered by the state boards of education – or in the case of private schools, private organizations whose affiliations align with those of the school. Tertiary school entrance qualifications and vocational qualifications are provided by other organizations.

- College Board – administers the SAT Reasoning Test, SAT Subject Tests, PSAT/NMSQT, Advanced Placement exams, and College Level Examination Program, developed by the Educational Testing Service
- ACT, Inc – administers the American College Test
- Educational Testing Service – administers the Graduate Record Examination and Test of English as a Foreign Language (TOEFL)
- Law School Admission Council – administers the Law School Admission Test
- Association of American Medical Colleges – administers the Medical College Admission Test
- National Association of State Boards of Accountancy – administers the Uniform Certified Public Accountant Examination, developed and maintained by the American Institute of Certified Public Accountants

=== Zambia ===
The Examinations Council of Zambia sets and conduct examinations.

=== Zimbabwe ===
The Zimbabwe School Examinations Council administers the ZIMSEC GCE Ordinary Level and ZIMSEC GCE Advanced Level examinations.
