= Higher School Certificate (England and Wales) =

Former educational qualification in England and Wales

The Higher School Certificate (HSC) was an educational attainment standard qualification in England and Wales, established by the Secondary Schools Examination Council (SSEC). The Higher School Certificate Examination (HSCE) was usually taken at age 18, or two years after the School Certificate. It was abolished when A-Levels were introduced in 1951. The HSC made it compulsory to study a broader range of subjects, even though some students were strong in either the sciences or the arts and humanities. When A-Levels were introduced, pupils could study a narrower range of subjects in depth, chosen according to their strengths.
