= WJEC (exam board) =

British examination board based in Wales

- CBAC (Welsh)

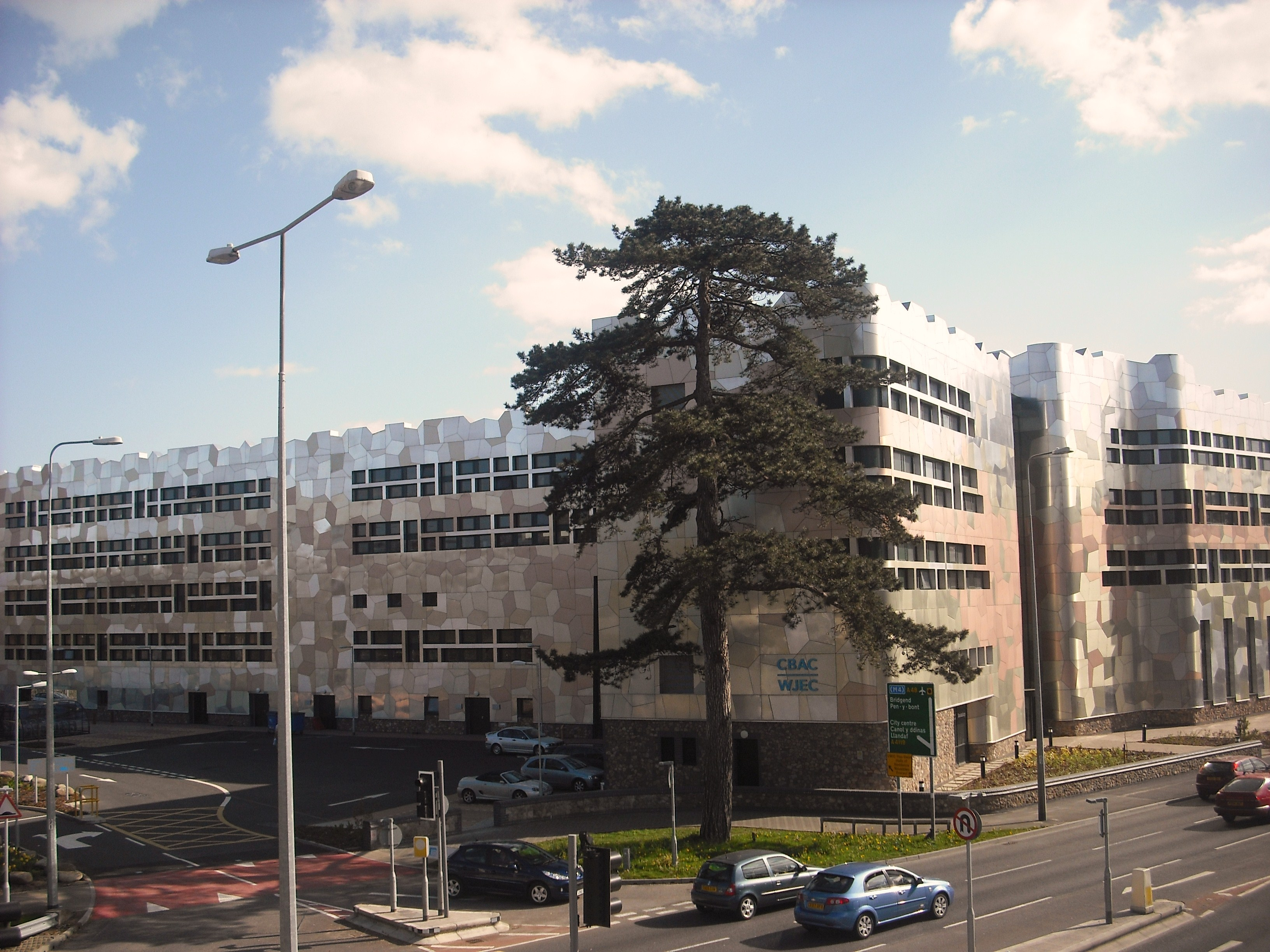
- Headquarters of the WJEC
- Formation: 1948; 78 years ago
- Headquarters: Cardiff, Wales
- Region served: Wales, England and Northern Ireland
- Website: www.wjec.co.uk
- Formerly called: Welsh Joint Education Committee; Cyd-bwyllgor Addysg Cymru (Welsh)

WJEC (Welsh: CBAC) is an examination board providing examinations, professional development and educational resources to schools and colleges in Wales and Northern Ireland under its own name, and the Eduqas brand for England.

== History ==
The Welsh Joint Education Committee was established as a consortium of Welsh Local Education Authorities in 1948, replacing the Central Welsh Board. It is now a registered charity, and a company limited by guarantee, led by a group trustees drawn from the local authorities in Wales and independents from both England and Wales. The organisation is based in Cardiff with a subsidiary company, WJEC CBAC Services Limited, providing specialist printing and publication services. WJEC is run on a day-to-day basis by a senior management team with experience in both the education and commercial sectors.

== Qualifications ==
WJEC’s qualifications include traditional academic and work-related subjects at Entry Level, GCSE, AS/A Level, other level 3 qualifications such as Level 3 Diploma/Certificate in Criminology or Level 3 Diploma/Certificate in Medical Science as well as Functional Skills and Key Skills. As competition between examination boards on qualifications syllabuses and educational standards for GCSE and A Levels is often discussed in the media, WJEC was interrogated by the British House of Commons on this matter and published a written declaration where it responded to the questions asked by the UK Parliament. A recent report by the BBC shows that there is an increasing trend for exam papers to be remarked because of growing allegations of inefficiency in grading under WJEC.

WJEC has introduced a computerized assessment system for some subjects to improve the examination experience and increase efficiency of marking.

WJEC provides Qualifications Wales-regulated qualifications to all state schools and colleges in Wales. Independent schools in Wales may choose between qualifications regulated by Welsh Government or those regulated by the Government of the United Kingdom. WJEC also collaborates with the University of Cambridge to offer educational qualifications.

New GCSEs, AS/A levels and vocational qualifications have been developed to incorporate the changes as outlined by the Welsh Government in their own series of reforms.

WJEC also provides the Welsh Baccalaureate. This offers a programme of study incorporating working with employers, community activities, individual investigations and key skills, as well as students’ GCSEs, GNVQs or A level studies.

WJEC offers more than 13,000 past papers, mark schemes and marked exemplars free of charge via their website, along with digital resources in English and Welsh. WJEC also provides an Online Exam Review (OER) in order to provide instant exam results analysis.

Since 2025, WJEC has controversially merged English language and literature GCSE into one qualification, abolished Science Triple award GCSE and has merged Mathematics and Numeracy GCSE into one qualification in its Made-for-Wales qualifications.

WJEC has also increased the number of coursework assignments in the new English Language and Literature GCSE significantly, focusing on the theme of belonging from an assigned novel. The English Language and Literature qualification has come under criticism from teachers.

== Eduqas ==
WJEC offers qualifications regulated by England's Ofqual through the brand Eduqas. The brand was developed as a response to diverging qualifications between England and Wales. Existing specifications being taught in schools and colleges in England continued to be branded WJEC until they were reformed (first teaching from 2015, 2016 or 2017) and relabelled Eduqas. Eduqas qualifications are also available in Northern Ireland, providing they meet CCEA Accreditation's regulations. Some Eduqas qualifications are also available in Wales where no Qualifications Wales-regulated equivalent exists.

The WJEC brand is used only for qualifications regulated by Qualifications Wales. Some WJEC qualifications are also available in Northern Ireland and a very small number of vocational qualifications are available in England.

== Professional development ==
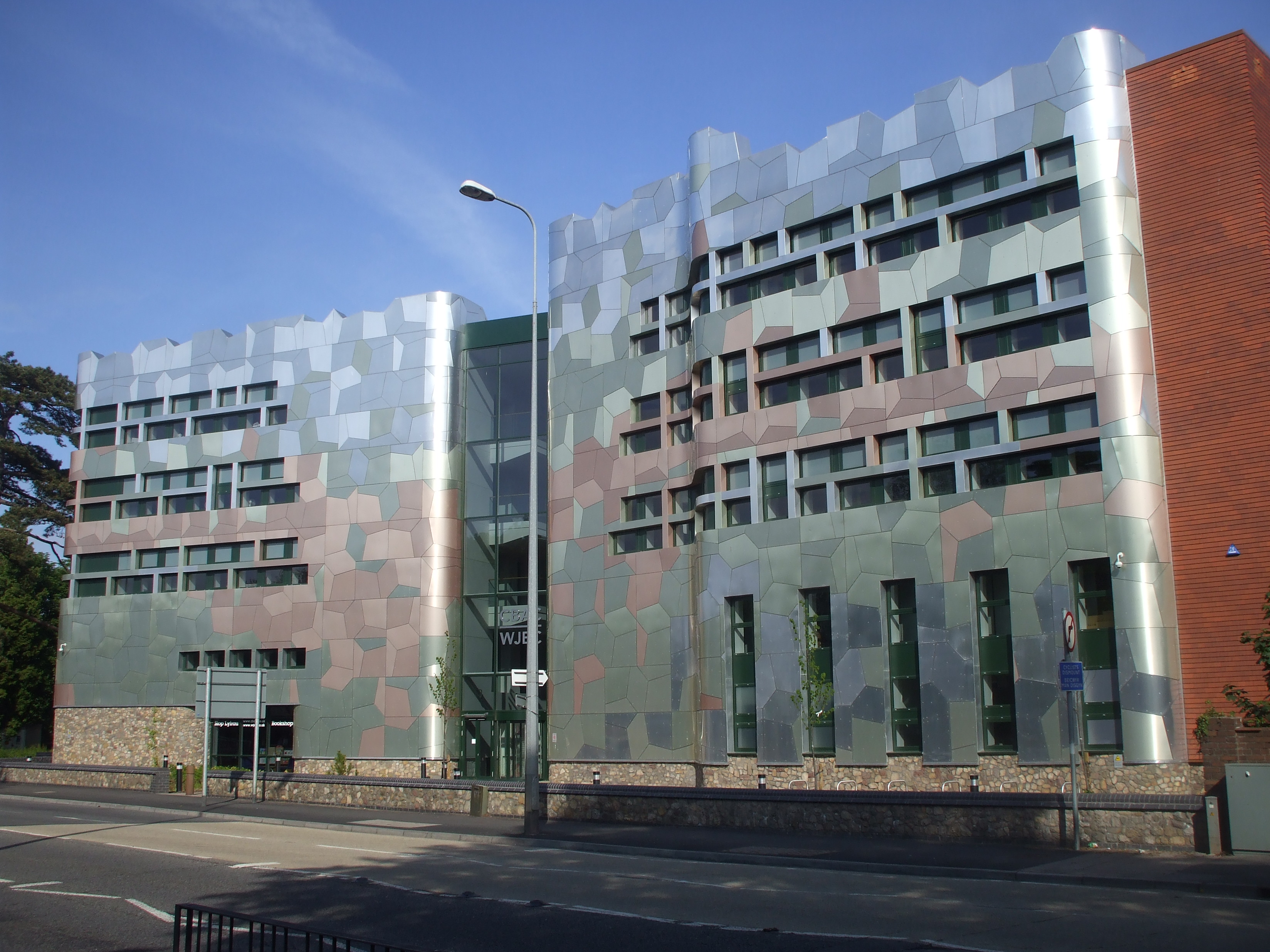
Main entrance to the headquarters, built on the site of the former Teledu Cymru studios

WJEC runs a programme of professional development with their subject specialists and Chief or Principal Examiners throughout England and Wales.

== National Youth Arts Wales ==
WJEC previously managed the National Youth Orchestra of Wales, National Youth Dance Wales and National Youth Theatre of Wales, under the joint brand of National Youth Arts Wales in partnership with Tŷ Cerdd.

In 2016, Welsh Government recommended that the ensembles become managed under one unified body. WJEC ceased to manage the ensembles as of 2017.

== Welsh for adults ==
WJEC provides resources for adults learning Welsh, allowing candidates to show their speaking, listening, reading and writing abilities at different levels. They also provide Welsh examinations designed for adult learners.
