= Critical thinking =

Analysis of facts to form a judgment

Critical thinking is the process of analyzing available facts, evidence, observations, and arguments to reach sound conclusions or informed choices. It involves recognizing underlying assumptions, providing justifications for ideas and actions, evaluating these justifications through comparisons with varying perspectives, and assessing their rationality and potential consequences. The goal of critical thinking is to form a judgment through the application of rational, skeptical, and unbiased analyses and evaluations. The use of the phrase critical thinking can be traced to John Dewey, who used the phrase reflective thinking, and the excellence of critical thinking in which a person can engage varies according to the individual's knowledge base on which both depend. According to philosopher Richard W. Paul, critical thinking and analysis are competencies that can be learned or trained. The application of critical thinking includes self-directed, self-disciplined, self-monitored, and self-corrective habits of the mind. Critical thinking is not a natural process; it must be induced, and ownership of the process must be taken for successful questioning and reasoning. Critical thinking presupposes a rigorous commitment to overcoming egocentrism and sociocentrism, which leads to a mindful command of effective communication and problem solving.

== History ==
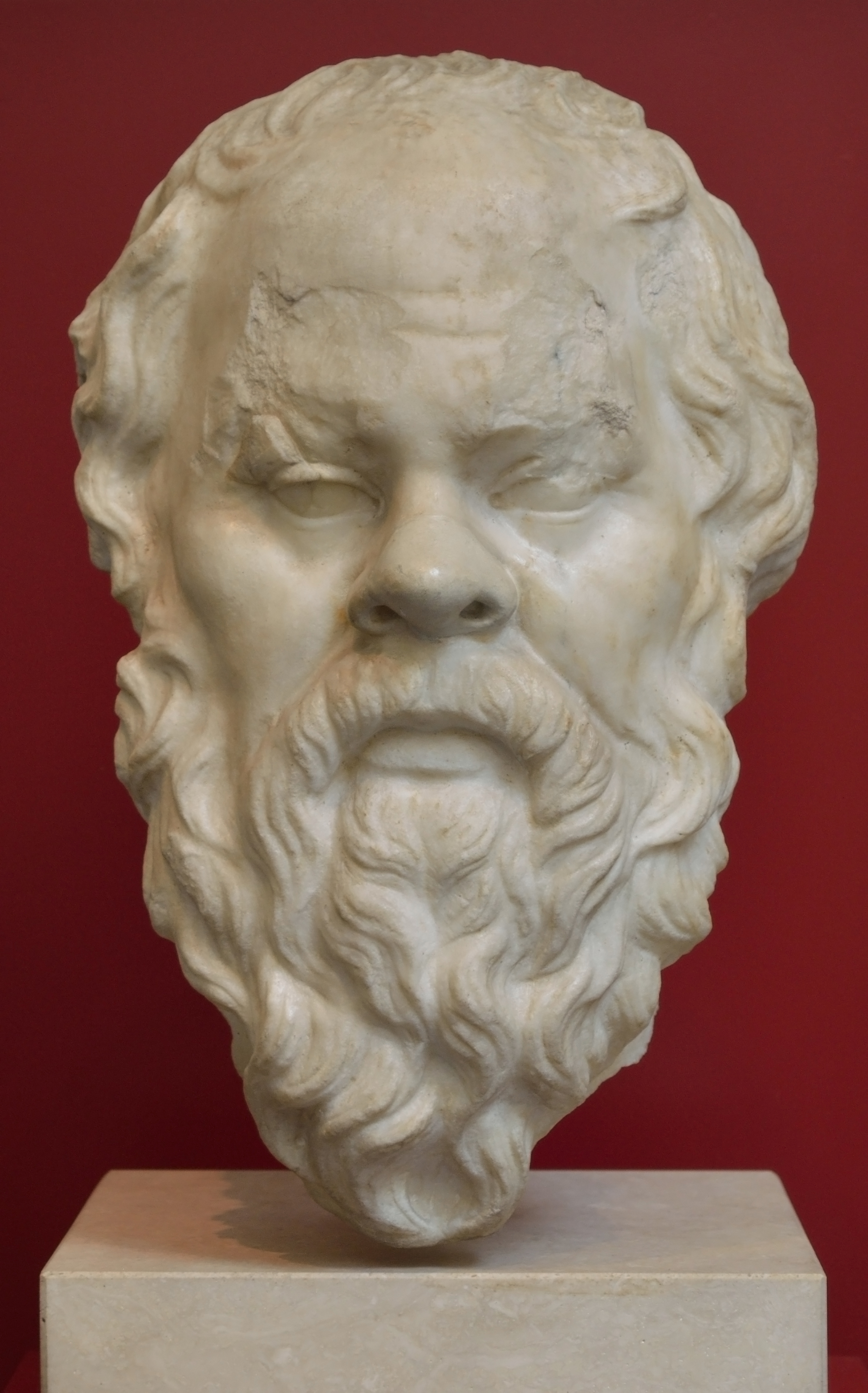
Socrates (470–399 BC) was an influential proponent of critical thinking

In the classical period (5th c.–4th c. BC) of Ancient Greece, the philosopher Plato (428–347 BC) indicated that the teachings of Socrates (470–399 BC) are the earliest records of what today is called critical thinking. In an early dialogue by Plato, the philosopher Socrates debates several speakers about the ethical matter of the rightness or wrongness of Socrates escaping from prison. Upon consideration, Plato concluded that to escape prison would violate everything he believes to be greater than himself: the laws of Athens and the guiding voice that Socrates claims to hear.

Socrates established the unreliability of authority and authority figures as possessors of knowledge and consequent insight; that for an individual man or woman to lead a good life that is worth living, that person must ask critical questions and possess an interrogative soul, which seeks evidence and then closely examines the available facts, and then follows the implications of the statement under analysis, thereby tracing the implications of thought and action.

As a form of co-operative argumentation, Socratic questioning requires the comparative judgment of facts, which answers then would reveal the person's irrational thinking and lack of verifiable knowledge. Socrates also demonstrated that Authority does not ensure accurate, verifiable knowledge; thus, Socratic questioning analyses beliefs, assumptions, and presumptions, by relying upon evidence and a sound rationale.

In modern times, the phrase critical thinking was coined by Pragmatist philosopher John Dewey in his book How We Think. As a type of intellectualism, the development of critical thinking is a means of critical analysis that applies rationality to develop a critique of the subject matter. According to the Foundation for Critical Thinking, in 1987 the U.S. National Council for Excellence in Critical Thinking defined critical thinking as the "intellectually disciplined process of actively and skillfully conceptualizing, applying, analyzing, synthesizing, or evaluating information gathered from, or generated by, observation, experience, reflection, reasoning, or communication, as a guide to belief and action."

== Etymology and origin of critical thinking ==
In the term critical thinking, the word critical, (Grk. κριτικός = kritikos = "critic") derives from the word critic and implies a critique; it identifies the intellectual capacity and the means "of judging", "of judgement", "for judging", and of being "able to discern". The intellectual roots of critical thinking are as ancient as its etymology, traceable, ultimately, to the critical reasoning of the Presocractic philosophers, as well as the teaching practice and vision of Socrates 2,500 years ago who discovered by a method of probing questioning that people could not rationally justify their confident claims to knowledge.

According to the Oxford English Dictionary, the exact term "critical thinking" first appeared in 1815, in the British literary journal The Critical Review, referring to critical analysis in the literary context. The meaning of "critical thinking" gradually evolved and expanded to mean a desirable general thinking skill by the end of the 19th century and early 20th century.

== Definitions ==
Traditionally, critical thinking has been variously defined as follows:

- "The intellectually disciplined process of actively and skillfully conceptualizing, applying, analyzing, synthesizing, and/or evaluating information gathered from, or generated by, observation, experience, reflection, reasoning, or communication, as a guide to belief and action."
- "Disciplined thinking that is clear, rational, open-minded, and informed by evidence"
- "Purposeful, self-regulatory judgment which results in interpretation, analysis, evaluation, and inference, as well as explanation of the evidential, conceptual, methodological, criteriological, or contextual considerations upon which that judgment is based"
- "Includes a commitment to using reason in the formulation of our beliefs"
- The skill and propensity to engage in an activity with reflective scepticism (McPeck, 1981)
- Thinking about one's thinking in a manner designed to organize and clarify, raise the efficiency of, and recognize errors and biases in one's own thinking. Critical thinking is not 'hard' thinking nor is it directed at solving problems (other than 'improving' one's own thinking). Critical thinking is inward-directed with the intent of maximizing the rationality of the thinker. One does not use critical thinking to solve problems—one uses critical thinking to improve one's process of thinking.
- "An appraisal based on careful analytical evaluation"
- "Critical thinking is a type of thinking pattern that requires people to be reflective, and pay attention to decision-making which guides their beliefs and actions. Critical thinking allows people to deduct with more logic, to process sophisticated information and look at various sides of an issue so they can produce more solid conclusions."
- Critical thinking has seven critical features: being inquisitive and curious, being open-minded to different sides, being able to think systematically, being analytical, being persistent to truth, being confident about critical thinking itself, and lastly, being mature.
- Although critical thinking could be defined in several different ways, there is a general agreement in its key component—the desire to reach for a satisfactory result, and this should be achieved by rational thinking and result-driven manner. Halpern thinks that critical thinking firstly involves learned abilities such as problem-solving, calculation and successful probability application. It also includes a tendency to engage the thinking process. In recent times, Stanovich believed that modern IQ testing could hardly measure the ability of critical thinking.
- "Critical thinking is essentially a questioning, challenging approach to knowledge and perceived wisdom. It involves ideas and information from an objective position and then questioning this information in the light of our own values, attitudes and personal philosophy."

Contemporary critical thinking scholars have expanded these traditional definitions to include qualities, concepts, and processes such as creativity, imagination, discovery, reflection, empathy, connecting knowing, feminist theory, subjectivity, ambiguity, and inconclusiveness. Some definitions of critical thinking exclude these subjective practices.

1. According to Scriven and Paul (1987), "Critical thinking is the intellectually disciplined process of actively and skillfully conceptualizing, applying, analyzing, synthesizing, and/or evaluating information gathered from, or generated by, observation, experience, reflection, reasoning, or communication, as a guide to belief and action." This definition is endorsed by Harvey Siegel, Peter Facione, and Deanna Kuhn.
2. According to Ennis' definition, critical thinking requires a lot of attention and brain function. When a critical thinking approach is applied to education, it helps the student's brain function better and understand texts differently.
3. Different fields of study may require different types of critical thinking. Critical thinking provides more angles and perspectives upon the same material.

== Logic and rationality ==
The study of logical argumentation is relevant to the study of critical thinking. Logic is concerned with the analysis of arguments, including the appraisal of their correctness or incorrectness. In the field of epistemology, critical thinking is considered to be logically correct thinking, which allows for differentiation between logically true and logically false statements.

In "First wave" logical thinking, the thinker is removed from the train of thought, and the analysis of connections between concepts or points in thought is ostensibly free of any bias. In his essay Beyond Logicism in Critical Thinking Kerry S. Walters describes this ideology thus: "A logistic approach to critical thinking conveys the message to students that thinking is legitimate only when it conforms to the procedures of informal (and, to a lesser extent, formal) logic and that the good thinker necessarily aims for styles of examination and appraisal that are analytical, abstract, universal, and objective. This model of thinking has become so entrenched in conventional academic wisdom that many educators accept it as canon". Such principles are concomitant with the increasing dependence on a quantitative understanding of the world.

In the "second wave" of critical thinking, authors consciously moved away from the logocentric mode of critical thinking characteristic of the "first wave". Although many scholars began to take a less exclusive view of what constitutes critical thinking, rationality and logic remain widely accepted as essential bases for critical thinking. Walters argues that exclusive logicism, in the first-wave sense, is based on "the unwarranted assumption that good thinking is reducible to logical thinking".

=== Deduction, abduction and induction ===
Argument terminology used in logic

There are three types of logical reasoning. Informally, two kinds of logical reasoning can be distinguished in addition to formal deduction, which are induction and abduction.

==== Deduction ====
- Deduction is the conclusion drawn from the structure of an argument's premises, by use of rules of inference formally those of propositional calculus. For example: X is human and all humans have a face, so X has a face.

==== Induction ====
- Induction is drawing a conclusion from a pattern that is guaranteed by the strictness of the structure to which it applies. For example: The sum of even integers is even. Let $x,y,z \in \mathbb{Z}$ then $2x,2y,2z$ are even by definition. If $x+y=z$, then $2x+2y=2(x+y)=2z$, which is even; so summing two even numbers results in an even number.

==== Abduction ====
- Abduction is drawing a conclusion using a heuristic that is likely, but not inevitable given some foreknowledge. For example: I observe sheep in a field, and they appear white from my viewing angle, so sheep are white. Contrast with the deductive statement: Some sheep are white on at least one side.

=== Critical thinking and rationality ===
Kerry S. Walters, an emeritus philosophy professor from Gettysburg College, argues that rationality demands more than just logical or traditional methods of problem solving and analysis or what he calls the "calculus of justification" but also considers "cognitive acts such as imagination, conceptual creativity, intuition and insight". These "functions" are focused on discovery, on more abstract processes instead of linear, rules-based approaches to problem-solving. The linear and non-sequential mind must both be engaged in the rational mind.

The ability to critically analyze an argument—to dissect its structure and components, including its thesis and reasons—is essential. But so is the ability to be flexible and consider non-traditional alternatives and perspectives. These complementary functions allow critical thinking to be a practice that encompasses imagination and intuition in cooperation with traditional modes of deductive inquiry.

== Functions ==
The list of core critical thinking skills includes observation, interpretation, analysis, inference, evaluation, explanation, and metacognition. According to Reynolds (2011), an individual or group engaged in a strong way of critical thinking gives due consideration to establish for instance:

- Evidence through reality
- Context skills to isolate the problem from context
- Relevant criteria for making the judgment well
- Applicable methods or techniques for forming the judgment
- Applicable theoretical constructs for understanding the problem and the question at hand

In addition to possessing strong critical-thinking skills, one must be disposed to engage problems and decisions using those skills. Critical thinking employs not only logic but broad intellectual criteria such as clarity, credibility, accuracy, precision, relevance, depth, breadth, significance, and fairness.

Critical thinking calls for the ability to:

- Recognize problems, to find workable means for meeting those problems
- Understand the importance of prioritization and order of precedence in problem-solving
- Gather and marshal pertinent (relevant) information
- Recognize unstated assumptions and values
- Comprehend and use language with accuracy, clarity, and discernment
- Interpret data, to appraise evidence and evaluate arguments
- Recognize the existence (or non-existence) of logical relationships between propositions
- Draw warranted conclusions and generalizations
- Put to test the conclusions and generalizations at which one arrives
- Reconstruct one's patterns of beliefs on the basis of wider experience
- Render accurate judgments about specific things and qualities in everyday life

In sum:

"A persistent effort to examine any belief or supposed form of knowledge in the light of the evidence that supports or refutes it and the further conclusions to which it tends."

Critical thinking is significant in the learning process of internalization, in the construction of basic ideas, principles, and theories inherent in content. And critical thinking is significant in the learning process of application, whereby those ideas, principles, and theories are implemented effectively as they become relevant in learners' lives.

=== In professional fields ===
Critical thinking is an important element of all professional fields and academic disciplines (by referencing their respective sets of permissible questions, evidence sources, criteria, etc.). It is widely recognized as an essential proficiency across professional fields and academic disciplines, where effective decision making, problem solving, and professional judgment is used. Within the framework of scientific skepticism, the process of critical thinking involves the careful acquisition and interpretation of information and use of it to reach a well-justified conclusion. The concepts and principles of critical thinking can be applied to any context or case but only by reflecting upon the nature of that application. Principles of critical thinking are broadly applicable and their usage can be seen across disciplines that each rely on its own standards such as evidence and methods. Critical thinking forms, therefore, a system of related, and overlapping, modes of thought such as anthropological thinking, sociological thinking, historical thinking, political thinking, psychological thinking, philosophical thinking, mathematical thinking, chemical thinking, biological thinking, ecological thinking, legal thinking, ethical thinking, musical thinking, thinking like a painter, sculptor, nurse, engineer, business person, etc. In other words, though critical-thinking principles are universal, their application to disciplines requires a process of reflective contextualization. Psychology offerings, for example, have included courses such as Critical Thinking about the Paranormal, in which students are subjected to a series of cold readings and tested on their belief of the "psychic", who is eventually announced to be a fake. In short, critical thinking is considered important for enabling a professional in any field to analyze, evaluate, explain, and restructure thinking, thereby ensuring the act of thinking without false belief.

Critical thinking expands beyond the professional methods, and involves the ability to recognize bias, misinformation, and other flawed reasoning to be able to reflect on one owns reasoning. Research in cognitive psychology and professional education states that both skill development and our habitual mind or attitudes, open-mindedness and skepticism, are necessary to apply when using critical thinking.

However, even with knowledge of the methods of logical inquiry and reasoning, mistakes occur, and due to a thinker's inability to apply the methodology consistently, and because of overruling character traits such as egocentrism. Critical thinking includes identification of prejudice, bias, propaganda, self-deception, distortion, misinformation, etc. Given research in cognitive psychology, some educators believe that schools should focus on teaching their students critical-thinking skills and cultivation of intellectual traits.

== Habits or traits of the mind ==
The habits of mind that characterize a person strongly disposed toward critical thinking include a desire to follow reason and evidence wherever they may lead, a systematic approach to problem-solving, inquisitiveness, even-handedness, and confidence in reasoning.

According to a definition analysis by Kompf & Bond (2001), critical thinking involves problem-solving, decision making, metacognition, rationality, rational thinking, reasoning, knowledge, intelligence and also a moral component such as reflective thinking. Critical thinkers therefore need to have reached a level of maturity in their development, possess a certain attitude as well as a set of taught skills.

There is a postulation by some writers that the tendencies from habits of mind should be thought as virtues to demonstrate the characteristics of a critical thinker. These intellectual virtues are ethical qualities that encourage motivation to think in particular ways towards specific circumstances. However, these virtues have also been criticized by skeptics who argue that the evidence is lacking for a specific mental basis underpinning critical thinking.

== Teaching critical thinking ==
John Dewey is one of many educational leaders who recognized that a curriculum aimed at building thinking skills would benefit the individual learner, the community, and democracy.

In a 2014 meta-analysis, researchers reviewed 341 quasi- or true-experimental studies of teaching critical thinking, all of which used some form of standardized critical-thinking measure. The authors describe the various methodological approaches and attempt to categorize differing assessment tools, which include standardized tests (and second-source measures), tests developed by teachers, tests developed by researchers, and tests developed by teachers who also serve the role as the researcher. The results emphasized the need for exposing students to real-world problems and the importance of encouraging open dialogue within a supportive environment. Effective strategies for teaching critical thinking are thought to be possible in a wide variety of educational settings. One attempt to assess the humanities' role in teaching critical thinking and reducing belief in pseudoscientific claims was made at North Carolina State University. Some success was noted and the researchers emphasized the value of the humanities in providing the skills to evaluate current events and qualitative data in context.

Historically, the teaching of critical thinking focused only on logical procedures such as formal and informal logic. This emphasized to students that good thinking is equivalent to logical thinking. However, a second wave of critical thinking, urges educators to value conventional techniques, meanwhile expanding what it means to be a critical thinker. In 1994, Kerry Walters compiled a conglomeration of sources surpassing this logical restriction to include many different authors' research regarding connected knowing, empathy, gender-sensitive ideals, collaboration, world views, intellectual autonomy, morality and enlightenment. These concepts invite students to incorporate their own perspectives and experiences into their thinking. Scott Lilienfeld notes that there is some evidence to suggest that basic critical-thinking skills might be successfully taught to children at a younger age than previously thought.

In the English and Welsh school systems, Critical Thinking is offered as a subject that 16- to 18-year-olds can take as an A-Level.

=== Well-educated citizens ===
In 1995, a meta-analysis of the literature on teaching effectiveness in higher education noted concerns that higher education was failing to meet society's requirements for well-educated citizens. It concluded that although faculty may aspire to develop students' thinking skills, in practice they have tended to aim at facts and concepts utilizing lowest levels of cognition, rather than developing intellect or values.

Critical thinking is also considered important for human rights education for toleration. The Declaration of Principles on Tolerance adopted by UNESCO in 1995 affirms that "education for tolerance could aim at countering factors that lead to fear and exclusion of others, and could help young people to develop capacities for independent judgement, critical thinking and ethical reasoning".

== Assessment of critical thinking ==
Under the OCR exam board, students can sit two exam papers for the Advanced Subsidiary: "Credibility of Evidence" and "Assessing and Developing Argument". The full Advanced GCE is now available: in addition to the two Advanced Subsidiary units, candidates sit the two papers "Resolution of Dilemmas" and "Critical Reasoning". The A-level tests candidates on their ability to think critically about, and analyze, arguments on their deductive or inductive validity, as well as producing their own arguments. It also tests their ability to analyze certain related topics such as credibility and ethical decision-making. However, due to its comparative lack of subject content, many universities do not accept it as a main A-level for admissions. Nevertheless, the Advanced Subsidiary is often useful in developing reasoning skills, and the full Advanced GCE is useful for degree courses in politics, philosophy, history or theology, providing the skills required for critical analysis that are useful, for example, in biblical study.

There used to also be an Advanced Extension Award offered in Critical Thinking in the UK, open to any A-level student regardless of whether they have the Critical Thinking A-level. Cambridge International Examinations have an A-level in Thinking Skills.

From 2008, Assessment and Qualifications Alliance has also been offering an A-level Critical Thinking specification. OCR exam board have also modified theirs for 2008. Many examinations for university entrance set by universities, on top of A-level examinations, also include a critical-thinking component, such as the LNAT, the UKCAT, the BioMedical Admissions Test and the Thinking Skills Assessment.

In Qatar, critical thinking was offered by Al-Bairaq - an outreach, non-traditional educational program that targeted high school students and focussed on a curriculum based on STEM fields. The idea behind this was to offer high school students the opportunity to connect with the research environment in the Center for Advanced Materials (CAM) at Qatar University. Faculty members train and mentor the students and help develop and enhance their critical thinking, problem-solving, and teamwork skills.

== Research of critical thinking ==
After undertaking research in schools, Edward M. Glaser proposed in 1941 that the ability to think critically involves three elements:

1. An attitude of being disposed to consider in a thoughtful way the problems and subjects that come within the range of one's experiences
2. Knowledge of the methods of logical inquiry and reasoning
3. Some skill in applying those methods.

The Critical Thinking project at Human Science Lab, London, is involved in the scientific study of all major educational systems in prevalence today to assess how the systems are working to promote or impede critical thinking.

Contemporary cognitive psychology regards human reasoning as a complex process that is both reactive and reflective. This presents a problem that is detailed as a division of a critical mind in juxtaposition to sensory data and memory.

The psychological theory disposes of the absolute nature of the rational mind, in reference to conditions, abstract problems and discursive limitations. Where the relationship between critical-thinking skills and critical-thinking dispositions is an empirical question, the ability to attain causal domination exists, for which Socrates was known to be largely disposed against as the practice of Sophistry. Accounting for a measure of "critical-thinking dispositions" is the California Measure of Mental Motivation and the California Critical Thinking Dispositions Inventory. The Critical Thinking Toolkit is an alternative measure that examines student beliefs and attitudes about critical thinking.

== Online communication ==
The advent and rising popularity of online courses have prompted some to ask if computer-mediated communication promotes, hinders, or has no effect on the amount and quality of critical thinking in a course (relative to face-to-face communication). There is some evidence to suggest a fourth, more nuanced possibility: that online communication may promote some aspects of critical thinking but hinder others. For example, Guiller et al. (2008) found that, relative to face-to-face discourse, online discourse featured more justifications, while face-to-face discourse featured more instances of students expanding on what others had said. The increase in justifications may be due to the asynchronous nature of online discussions, while the increase in expanding comments may be due to the spontaneity of 'real-time' discussion. Newman et al. (1995) showed similar differential effects. They found that while online communications boasted more important statements and linking of ideas, it lacked novelty. The authors suggest that this may be due to difficulties participating in a brainstorming-style activity in an asynchronous environment. Rather, the asynchrony may promote users to put forth "considered, thought out contributions".

Researchers assessing critical thinking in online discussion forums often employ a technique called Content Analysis, where the text of online discourse (or the transcription of face-to-face discourse) is systematically coded for different kinds of statements relating to critical thinking. For example, a statement might be coded as "Discuss ambiguities to clear them up" or "Welcoming outside knowledge" as positive indicators of critical thinking. Conversely, statements reflecting poor critical thinking may be labeled as "Sticking to prejudice or assumptions" or "Squashing attempts to bring in outside knowledge". The frequency of these codes in online communication and face-to-face discourse can be compared to draw conclusions about the quality of critical thinking.

Searching for evidence of critical thinking in discourse has roots in a definition of critical thinking put forth by Kuhn (1991), which emphasizes the social nature of discussion and knowledge construction. There is limited research on the role of social experience in critical thinking development, but there is some evidence to suggest it is an important factor. For example, research has shown that three- to four-year-old children can discern, to some extent, the differential credibility and expertise of individuals. Further evidence for the impact of social experience on the development of critical-thinking skills comes from work that found that 6- to 7-year-olds from China have similar levels of skepticism to 10- and 11-year-olds in the United States. If the development of critical-thinking skills was solely due to maturation, it is unlikely we would see such dramatic differences across cultures.

== See also ==
- Age of Enlightenment – European cultural movement
- Argument – Attempt to persuade or to determine the truth of a conclusion
- Argumentation theory – Academic field of logic and rhetoric
- Cognitive bias mitigation – Reduction of the negative effects of cognitive biases
- Critic – Person who offers reasoned judgment
- Critical Thinking (2020 film)
- Critical Thinking Awareness Day – Observance promoting critical thinking
- Demarcation problem – Philosophical question of how to distinguish between science and non-science
- Dialectic – Method of reasoning and philosophical argument
- Disinformation – Deliberately misleading information
- Freedom of thought – Freedom to hold a thought
- Freethought – Position that beliefs should be formed only on the basis of logic, reason, and empiricism
- Indoctrination – Inculcating ideas in a person
- International Philosophy Olympiad – Philosophy competition for high school students
- Logic – Study of correct reasoning
- Logical reasoning – Process of drawing correct inferences
- Outline of human intelligence – Topic tree presenting the traits, capacities, models, and research fields of human intelligence
- Outline of thought – Topic tree that identifies many types of thoughts, types of thinking, aspects of thought, related fields
- Philosophy education – Practice of teaching philosophy
- Skepticism – Doubtful attitude toward knowledge claims
- Sapere aude – Latin phrase meaning "dare to know"
- Source criticism – Process of evaluating an information source
- World Philosophy Day – International day proclaimed by UNESCO
