= A-level (United Kingdom) =

School leaving qualification in England, Wales, and Northern Ireland

GCE Advanced Level
- Year started: 1951
- Offered: Once a year
- Regions: England, Wales and Northern Ireland
Other UK counterparts
- Scotland: Scottish Highers; Advanced Higher

The A-level (Advanced Level) is a main school leaving qualification of the General Certificate of Education in England, Wales, Northern Ireland, the Channel Islands and the Isle of Man. It is available as an alternative qualification in other countries, where it is similarly known as an A-Level.

Students generally study for A-levels over a two-year period. For much of their history, A-levels have been examined by written exams taken at the end of these two years. A more modular approach to examination became common in many subjects starting in the late 1980s, and standard for September 2000 and later cohorts, with students taking their subjects to the half-credit "AS" level after one year and proceeding to full A-level the next year (sometimes in fewer subjects). In 2015, Ofqual decided to change back to a terminal approach where students sit all examinations at the end of the second year. AS is still offered, but as a separate qualification; AS grades no longer count towards a subsequent A-level in England.

Most students study three or four A-level subjects simultaneously during the two post-16 years (ages 16–18) in a secondary school, in a sixth form college, in a further and higher education college, or in a tertiary college, as part of their further education.

A-levels are recognised by many universities as the standard for assessing the suitability of applicants for admission in England, Wales, and Northern Ireland, and many such universities partly base their admissions offers on a student's predicted A-level grades, with the majority of these offers conditional on achieving a minimum set of final grades.

== Retakes ==
In the UK, some schools and colleges offer one-year A Level retake programmes for students who wish to improve their grades.

== History ==
A-levels were introduced in 1951 as a standardised school-leaving qualification, replacing the Higher School Certificate. The examinations were taken on a subject-by-subject basis, the subjects being chosen according to the strengths and interests of the student. This encouraged specialization and in-depth study of three to four subjects. At first, A-levels were graded as simply distinction, pass or fail (although students were given an indication of their marks, to the nearest 5%). Candidates obtaining a distinction originally had the option to sit a scholarship level paper on the same material, to attempt to win one of 400 national scholarships. The scholarship level was renamed the S-Level in 1963.

Quite soon, rising numbers of students taking the A-level examinations required more differentiation of achievement below the S-Level standard. Grades were therefore introduced, with recommendations by the Secondary School Examinations Council (SSEC) of approximate proportions of pupils for each grade.

Grade	A	B	C	D	E	O	Fail
Percentage	10%	15%	10%	15%	20%	20%	10%

The O grade was equivalent to a GCE Ordinary Level pass which indicated a performance equivalent to the lowest pass grade at Ordinary Level.

Over time, the validity of this system was questioned because, rather than reflecting a standard, norm referencing simply maintained a specific proportion of candidates at each grade, which in small cohorts was subject to statistical fluctuations in standards. In 1984, the government's Secondary Examinations Council decided to replace the norm referencing with criterion referencing: grades would in future be awarded on examiner judgement thus eliminating a possible inadequacy of the existing scheme.

The criterion referencing scheme came into effect for the summer 1987 exams as the system set examiners specific criteria for the awarding of B and E grades to candidates, and then divided out the other grades according to fixed percentages. Rather than awarding an Ordinary Level for the lowest pass, a new "N" (for Nearly passed) was introduced. Criticisms of A-level grading continued, and when Curriculum 2000 was introduced, the decision was made to have specific criteria for each grade, and the 'N' grade was abolished.

In 1989, Advanced Supplementary (AS) awards were introduced; they were intended to broaden the subjects a pupil studied post 16, and were to complement rather than be part of a pupil's A-level studies. AS-Levels were generally taken over two years, and in a subject the pupil was not studying at A-Level. Each AS level contained half the content of an A-Level, and at the same level of difficulty.

Initially, a student might study three subjects at A-Level and one at AS-Level, or often even four subjects at A-Level. However, due to decreasing public spending on education over time, a growing number of schools and sixth form colleges would now arrange for their pupils to study for three A-Levels instead of four.

A-levels evolved gradually from a two-year linear course with an exam at the end, to a modular course, between the late 1980s and 2000. By the year 2000 there was a strong educational reason to standardise the exam and offer greater breadth to students through modules and there was also a pragmatic case based on the inefficiency of linear courses where up to 30% of students were failing to complete or pass.

Curriculum 2000 was introduced in September 2000, with the first new examinations taken in January and June of the following year. The Curriculum 2000 reforms also replaced the S-Level extension paper with the Advanced Extension Award.

The Conservative Party under Prime Minister David Cameron initiated reforms for A-levels to change from modular to the current linear structure. British Examination Boards (Edexcel, AQA and OCR) regulated and accredited by the government of the United Kingdom responded to the government's reform announcements by modifying specifications of several A-level subjects.

On 18 March 2020, A-level examinations were cancelled in order to curtail the spread of COVID-19 in the 2019–2020 coronavirus pandemic. The A-level and AS-level qualifications would instead be awarded based upon a mix of teacher assessment and informal "mock" exams taken earlier in the school year. This led to a grading controversy.

On 6 January 2021, Secretary of State for Education Gavin Williamson confirmed that the 2020/21 series of A-levels would also be cancelled, pending further arrangements by Ofqual and the Department for Education.

== Curriculum ==
=== Structure ===
Prior to the 2015 government reforms of the A-level system, A-levels had (since the Curriculum 2000 reforms) consisted of two equally weighted parts: AS (Advanced Subsidiary) Level, usually assessed in the first year of study, and "A2 Level", usually assessed in the second year of study. It was also possible to take both AS Levels and A2 Levels for a subject in the same examination session - this was most common with Mathematics and Further Mathematics, where a student may have completed the entire Mathematics A-Level in their first year of study, followed by the entire Further Mathematics A-Level in their second. It was typical for an AS course to comprise two or three modules, with the A2 half of the course comprising two or three modules, for a total of four or six modules. The modules within each part may have been equally weighted, or be of varying weights. Modules were either assessed by externally marked papers, or by school-assessed, externally moderated coursework.

Following the reforms, A-Levels and AS-Levels have been decoupled, with AS-Level results no longer counting towards the A-Level qualification. The AS-Level consists of the first half of the A-Level course, and can be taught alongside the first year of the full A-Level course. Grades are determined by adding up the mark for each component (which is sometimes weighted) and applying a grade boundary.

=== Subjects offered ===
A wide variety of subjects are offered at A-level by the five exam boards. Although exam boards often alter their curricula, this table shows the majority of subjects which are consistently available for study. Click on "show" below to see the list.

Subject	# boards	AQA	OCR	Edexcel	WJEC/Eduqas	CCEA
Accounting	1	✓				
Arabic	1			✓		
Art and Design	5	✓	✓	✓	✓	✓
Bengali	1	✓				
Biology	5	✓	✓	✓	✓	✓
Business	5	✓	✓	✓	✓	✓
Chemistry	5	✓	✓	✓	✓	✓
Chinese (Mandarin)	1			✓		
Classical Civilisation	1		✓			
Computer Science	3	✓	✓		✓	
Dance	1	✓				
Digital Technology	1					✓
Drama and Theatre	3	✓		✓	✓	
Design & Technology	5	✓	✓	✓	✓	✓
D&T: Fashion & Textiles	1	✓				
D&T: Food Technology	2	✓		✓		
D&T: Product Design	3	✓	✓	✓		
Economics	5	✓	✓	✓	✓	✓
Electronics	1				✓	
English Language	4	✓	✓	✓	✓	
English Literature	5	✓	✓	✓	✓	✓
Environmental Studies/Technology	2	✓				✓
Film Studies	2		✓		✓	
French	4	✓		✓	✓	✓
Geography	5	✓	✓	✓	✓	✓
Geology	2		✓		✓	
German	4	✓		✓	✓	✓
Government and Politics	5	✓	✓	✓	✓	✓
Greek (Modern/Classical)	2		✓	✓		
Gujarati	1		✓			
Hebrew (Modern/Biblical)	2	✓	✓			
History	5	✓	✓	✓	✓	✓
History of Art (and Design)	3	✓		✓		✓
Irish	1					✓
Italian	1			✓		
Japanese	1			✓		
Latin	1		✓			
Law	3	✓	✓		✓	
Mathematics	5	✓	✓	✓	✓	✓
Media Studies	3	✓	✓		✓	
Music	5	✓	✓	✓	✓	✓
Music Technology	1			✓		
Persian	1		✓			
Philosophy	1	✓				
Physical Education	4	✓	✓	✓	✓	
Physics	5	✓	✓	✓	✓	✓
Polish	1	✓				
Portuguese	1			✓		
Punjabi	1	✓				
Psychology	4	✓	✓	✓	✓	
Religious Studies	5	✓	✓	✓	✓	✓
Russian	1			✓		
Sociology	3	✓	✓		✓	
Software Systems Development	1					✓
Spanish	4	✓		✓	✓	✓
Sports Science	1					✓
Statistics	1			✓		
Turkish	2		✓	✓		
Urdu	1			✓		
Welsh	1				✓	

=== Studying ===
The number of A-level exams taken by students can vary. A typical route is to study four subjects at AS level and then drop down to three at A2 level, although some students continue with their fourth subject. Three is usually the minimum number of A-levels required for university entrance, with some universities specifying the need for a fourth AS subject. There is no limit set on the number of A-levels one can study, and a number of students take five or more A-levels. It is permissible to take A-levels in languages one already speaks fluently, or courses with overlapping content, even if not always fully recognized by universities. There are many options that are in place for students to choose to do coursework.

=== Grading ===
The pass grades for A-levels are, from highest to lowest, A*, A, B, C, D and E. Those who do not reach the minimum standard required for a grade E receive the non-grade U (ungraded/unclassified), and those who fail to complete any of the subject's components will receive an X. There is no A* grade at AS level.

The process to decide these grades for modular A-levels involves the uniform mark scheme (UMS). Under this scheme, four-module A-levels have a maximum mark of 400 UMS (or 200 UMS each for AS and A2), and six-module A-levels have a maximum mark of 600 (or 300 UMS each for AS and A2). The maximum UMS within AS and A2 may be split unequally between each modules. For example, a Physics AS may have two exam modules worth 90 UMS and 150 UMS, and a coursework module worth 60 UMS. The 'raw marks' i.e. actual score received on a test may differ from UMS awarded. On each assignment, the correspondence of raw marks to UMS is decided by setting grade boundaries, a process which involves consultation by subject experts and consideration of statistics, aiming to keep standards for each grade the same year on year. Achieving less than 40% results in a U (unclassified). For passing grades, 40% corresponds to an E grade, 50% a D, 60% a C, 70% a B, and 80% an A. The A* grade was introduced in 2010 and is awarded to candidates who average 80% UMS across all modules, with a score over 90% UMS in all A2 modules. In Mathematics, which comprises six 100 UMS modules, only the C3 and C4 modules count towards this requirement. In Further Mathematics and Additional Further Mathematics, where more than three A2 modules can be taken, the three best-scoring A2 modules count.

=== Wales and Northern Ireland ===
Recent research and the corresponding findings have shown that over a time span of several years students from Northern Ireland outperformed students from England and Wales in A-level examinations.

=== International comparisons ===
==== Hong Kong ====
According to UCAS and HKEAA, the Hong Kong A-level examination has historically been benchmarked against the UK A-levels. In general, a UK A grade is broadly equivalent to a Hong Kong A-C grade. This conclusion is based mainly on the percentage of pupils achieving the respective grades in respective exams. In the UK, on average 25% of participants of each subject achieved an A grade every year, compared to the 25% A-C rate in Hong Kong – A(4%), A-B (10%), A-C (25%). According to the BBC, the percentage of students achieving an A* is about 8–10%, which essentially lies within the A-B range of their Hong Kong counterparts in respective subjects.

==== United States ====
In the United States of America the high school diploma is the qualification generally required for entry into colleges and universities. Students are usually evaluated and granted admission to US higher education institutions based on a combination of school marks, via a transcript from their high school, and a college entrance exam, most commonly the SAT or ACT.

In the United Kingdom, the high school diploma is considered to be at the level of the General Certificate of Secondary Education (GCSE), which is awarded at Year 11. For college and university admissions, the high school diploma may be accepted in lieu of the GCSE if an average grade of C is obtained in subjects with a GCSE counterpart.

As the more academically rigorous A-levels awarded at Year 13 are expected for university admission, the high school diploma alone is generally not considered to meet university requirements. Students who wish to study in the United Kingdom may additionally participate in the Advanced Placement (AP) or International Baccalaureate (IB) programs, which are considered to be at the level of the A-level qualifications and earn points on the UCAS Tariff, or may opt to take A-level examinations in British international schools or as private candidates. College Entrance Examination Board (CEEB) tests, such as the SAT, SAT Subject Tests, or the ACT, may also be considered.

The Universities and Colleges Admissions Service (UCAS) recommends that in addition to a high school diploma, grades of 3 or above in at least two, or ideally three, Advanced Placement exams may be considered as meeting general entry requirements for admission. The IB Diploma may also be accepted. For the College Entrance Examination Board tests, a minimum score of 600 or higher in all sections of the SAT or a minimum score of 26 or higher in all sections of the ACT along with a minimum score of 600 in relevant SAT Subject Tests may be considered as meeting general entry requirements for admission.

=== Special educational needs ===
The Equality Act says that exam boards are required to take ‘such steps as it is reasonable to have to take to avoid the disadvantage’, meaning that they are required to make reasonable adjustments for students who would otherwise be at a substantial disadvantage when demonstrating their skills, knowledge and understanding in an assessment. For students taking GCE A-level examinations with learning difficulties, an injury/repetitive strain injury (RSI) or other disabilities, some of the access arrangements offered are:

- Extra time (the most common approved is 25%, but the amount depends on the severity of the disability, and the student's processing speed. It can be allowed for: disorders such as ADHD, Dyspraxia, Dyslexia, or any other disabilities that affect the student's processing speed, an injury that affects the time needed in the exam, or learning in English as a second language provided that the student has been studying in the UK for not more than 2 years)
- An amanuensis (somebody types or handwrites as the student dictates; this is normally used when the student cannot write due to an injury or disability)
- A word processor (without any spell checking tools) can be used by students who have trouble writing legibly or who are unable to write quickly enough to complete the exam within the time limit
- A different format exam paper (large print, Braille, printed on coloured paper, etc.)
- A 'reader' (a teacher/exam invigilator can read out the words written on the exam, but they cannot explain their meaning)
- A different room (sometimes due to a disability a student can be placed in a room by themselves or with selected others; this also happens when an amanuensis is used, so as not to disturb the other candidates. All exam rooms are covered by separate dedicated invigilators.)

Access arrangements must be approved by the exam board concerned. There are others available, but these are the most commonly used.

=== Examination boards ===
A-level examinations in the UK are currently administered through 5 examination boards: AQA, OCR, Edexcel (London Examinations), WJEC/Eduqas and CCEA. The present 5 can trace their roots via a series of mergers or acquisitions to one or more of the originally 9 GCE Examination boards. Additionally, there are four examination boards offering A-level qualifications internationally: OxfordAQA, Edexcel, Learning Resource Network (LRN) and the CIE. OCR and CIE are both branches of the parent organisation, Cambridge Assessment. OxfordAQA is a partnership between AQA and Oxford University Press. In the UK it is customary for schools to register with multiple examination boards and to "mix and match" A-levels to get a combined curriculum that fits the school profile.

The exam boards finance themselves through the fees charged to the schools for administering the examination. In addition to the centre registration fee, A-level Mathematics will raise £120.00 per student, while Biology, Physics and Chemistry £90.00 per subject and languages such as Spanish, French and German £100.00 or £201.15 depending on the syllabus. (2019-20 AQA figures)

== Usage ==
=== England, Wales and Northern Ireland ===
A-levels are usually studied by students in Sixth Form, which refers to the last two years of secondary education in England, Wales and Northern Ireland, taken at ages 16–18. Some secondary schools have their own Sixth Form, which admits students from lower year groups, but will often accept external applications. There are also many specialist Sixth Form and Further Education Colleges which admit from feeder schools across a large geographic area. Admission to A-level programmes is at the discretion of providers, and usually depends on GCSE grades. A typical requirement would be 5 A*-C grades at GCSE, although requirements can be higher, particularly for independent schools and grammar schools.

=== Scotland ===
A-levels are offered as an alternate qualification by a small number of educational institutions in Scotland, in place of the standard Scottish Higher, and the Advanced Higher levels of the Scottish Qualifications Certificate. The schools that offer A-levels are mainly private fee-paying schools particularly for students wishing to attend university in England.

=== International schools ===
Many international schools choose to use the British system for their wide recognition. Furthermore, students may choose to sit the papers of British examination bodies at education centres around the world, such as those belonging to the British Council. According to the British Council, A-levels are similar to the American Advanced Placement courses which are themselves equivalent to first-year courses of America's four-year bachelor's degrees.

=== University admissions ===
A-level students often apply to universities before they have taken their final exams, with applications administered centrally through UCAS. British universities (including Scottish universities, which receive many applicants taking A-levels) consider GCSEs, AS-level results, predicted A-level results, and extracurricular accomplishments when deciding whether applicants should be made an offer through UCAS. These offers may be 'unconditional', guaranteeing a place regardless of performance in A2 examinations. Far more often, the offers are conditional on A-level grades, and become void should the student fail to achieve the marks expected by the university (for example, conditional offer of three A-levels at grades B-B-C). Universities may specify which subjects they wish these grades to be in (for example, conditional offer of grades A-A-B with a grade A in Mathematics). The offer may include additional requirements, such as attaining a particular grade in the Sixth Term Examination Paper. The university is obliged to accept the candidate if the conditions are met, but is not obliged to reject a candidate who misses the requirements. Leniency may in particular be shown if the candidate narrowly misses grades.

A-level grades are also sometimes converted into numerical scores, typically UCAS tariff scores. Under the new UCAS system starting in 2017, an A* grade at A-level is worth 56 points, while an A is worth 48, a B is worth 40, a C is worth 32, a D is 24, and a E is worth 16; so a university may instead demand that an applicant achieve 112 points, instead of the equivalent offer of B-B-C. This allows greater flexibility to students, as 112 points could also, for example, be achieved through the combination A-B-D, which would not have met the requirements of a B-B-C offer because of the D grade.

Depending on the specific offer made, a combination of more than 3 subjects (typically 4 or 5) with lower grades, or points from non-academic input such as higher level music grades or a Key Skills course, may also be accepted by the university. The text of the offer determines whether this flexibility is available – "112 UCAS Points" likely would, while "112 UCAS Points from three A-level subjects" would not.

=== International variants ===
There are currently three examination boards which provide an international variant of the United Kingdom A-level examinations to international students. These are Cambridge International Examinations (CIE), Edexcel and OxfordAQA.

== Awarding ==
UK: A-level Grade Distribution (per cent) and Number of Entries (Note: 2020 grades will not be counted as statistics given that, for the first time ever, the A-Level exams were cancelled as part of the 2020 UK education shutdown because of the ongoing COVID-19 pandemic.)
	A*	A (A*+A)	B	C	D	E	O/N	U/F	A–E	Entries
pre 1960									75.3	103,803
1963–1986		8–10	15	10	15	20	20	10	68–70	1975: 498,883 1980: 589,270
1982		8.9							68.2	
1985									70.5	634,557
1989		11.4	15.2	16.4	17.4	15.3	10.9	13.4	75.7	682,997
1990		11.7	15.5	16.9	17.7	15.2	10.7	12.3	76.7	684,065
1991		11.9	15.5	16.9	18.1	15.6	10.5	11.5	78.0	699,041
1992		12.8	16.3	17.4	18.0	15.3	9.8	10.4	79.8	731,240
1993		13.8	16.7	17.7	18.1	14.8	9.3	9.6	81.1	734,081
1994		14.8	17.1	18.6	18.1	14.4	8.8	8.1	83.0	732,974
1995		15.8	17.1	19.0	18.1	14.1	8.4	7.5	84.1	730,415
1996		16.0	18.0	19.8	18.3	13.7	7.8	6.4	85.8	739,163
1997		16.0	18.9	20.3	18.5	13.4	7.4	5.5	87.1	776,115
1998		16.8	18.9	20.8	18.3	13.0	7.2	5.0	87.8	794,262
1999		17.5	19.0	21.0	18.3	12.7	6.9	4.6	88.5	783,692
2000		17.8	19.2	21.2	18.5	12.4	6.6	4.3	89.1	771,809
2001		18.6	19.3	21.4	18.1	12.4	6.3	3.9	89.8	748,866
2002		20.7	21.9	22.7	18.1	10.9		5.7	94.3	701,380
2003		21.6	22.9	23.0	17.8	10.1		4.6	95.4	750,537
2004		22.4	23.4	23.2	17.5	9.5		4.0	96.0	766,247
2005		22.8	23.8	23.3	17.2	9.1		3.8	96.2	783,878
2006		24.1	24.0	23.2	16.6	8.7		3.4	96.6	805,698
2007		25.3	24.4	23.1	16.0	8.1		3.1	96.9	805,657
2008		25.9	24.9	23.1	15.7	7.6		2.8	97.2	827,737
2009		26.7	25.3	23.1	15.2	7.2		2.5	97.5	846,977
2010	8.1	18.9 (27)	25.2	23.2	15.2	7.0		2.4	97.6	853,933
2011	8.2	18.8 (27)	25.6	23.6	15.1	6.5		2.2	97.8	867,317
2012	7.9	18.7 (26.6)	26.0	24.0	14.9	6.5		2.0	98.0	861,819
2013	7.6	18.7 (26.3)	26.6	24.3	14.7	6.2		1.9	98.1	850,752
2014	8.2	17.8 (26.0)	26.4	24.3	14.8	6.5		2.0	98.0	833,807
2015	8.2	17.7 (25.9)	26.9	24.5	14.7	6.1		1.9	98.1	850,749
2016	8.1	17.7 (25.8)	27.1	24.7	14.6	5.9		1.9	98.1	836,705
2017	8.3	18.0 (26.3)	26.8	24.3	14.6	5.9		2.1	97.9	828,355
2018	8.0	18.4 (26.4)	26.6	24.0	14.5	6.1		2.4	97.6	811,776
2019	7.8	17.7 (25.5)	26.1	24.2	15.2	6.6		2.4	97.6	801,002
2020 (Note: 2020-21 due to COVID-19 grades were teacher awarded, rather than examined.)	14.4	24.2 (38.6)	27.5	21.8	9.1	2.7		0.3	97.6	781,029
2021	19.1	25.7 (45.8)	25.5	18.2	7.8	3.5		0.2	99.8	824,718
2022	14.6	21.8 (36.4)	26.4	19.8	11.0	4.8		1.6	98.4	848,910
2023	8.9	18.3 (27.2)	26.2	22.5	14.2	7.1		2.7	97.3	867,658
2024	9.3	18.5 (27.8)	26.1	22.5	14.0	6.8		2.8	97.2	886,514
2025	9.4	18.9 (28.3)	26.9	22.7	13.5	6.1		2.5	97.5	882,509
2026	9.6	18.9 (28.5)	27.3	22.6	13.2	5.9		2.5	97.5	906,425

=== UK A-Level classifications from June 1989 to 2026 ===
- A*
- A
- B
- C
- D
- E
- N/O
- F/U

Note: norm* - grades allocated per the norm referenced percentile quotas described above.

== Criticism and controversy ==
=== Grade inflation ===
The most common criticism of the A-level system is an accusation of grade inflation. The press have noted the steady rise in average grades for several consecutive years and drawn the conclusion that A-levels are becoming consistently easier. A 2007 report by Robert Coe compared students' scores in the ALIS ability test with equivalent grades achieved in A-level exams over a period of approximately 20 years; he found that students of similar ability were achieving on average about 2 grades higher than in the past. In the case of maths it was nearer to 3.5 grades higher.

The government and teaching bodies maintain that the improved grades represent higher levels of achievement due to improved and more experienced teaching methods, but some educationalists and journalists argue that the change is due to grade inflation and the examinations getting easier. It has also been suggested that government pressure on schools to achieve high examination results has led them to coach students to pass the examination rather than understand the subject. In 2000, the A-level system was changed to examine students at the end of each of the two years of A-level study, rather than only at the end of the two years. The results of the first year's exam (AS-level) allowed students to drop subjects they find difficult after one year and to retake AS examinations to achieve a higher grade at that level. The availability to resit the AS paper, with the best mark contributing to the full A level, has improved results of the A level. Some believe that students are tending to select easier subjects in order to achieve higher grades.

Universities in Britain have complained that the increasing number of A grades awarded makes it hard to distinguish between students at the upper end of the ability spectrum. Many universities administer their own entrance tests such as the BMAT and LNAT for specific courses, or conduct interviews to select applicants. In 2005, the head of admissions at the University of Cambridge outlined changes he believed should be made to the current system, particularly the use of the Advanced Extension Awards, a more challenging qualification based on the more advanced content of the A-level syllabus. More universities have wanted to see applicants' individual module results to see how comfortably they have achieved their result due to fears that the A-level might not offer an accurate test of ability, or that it is a good prediction of future academic success.

In 2002, allegations that students had been given lower marks than they deserved in order to fix overall results and make the pass rate seem lower than it had been in previous years were raised. The Tomlinson Inquiry was set up to ascertain whether this was an underhand way to disprove that A-levels were becoming too easy. As a result, some papers were re-marked but only 1,220 A-level and 733 AS-level students saw an improvement to their results.

To replace the cancelled summer 2020 examination series (owing to concerns over the spread of COVID-19), grades were awarded using centre-assessed grades and rankings. These were initially moderated by Ofqual but, owing to numerous problems, candidates' final grades reverted to those supplied by centres. This resulted in significant grade inflation, with initial calculations showing around 37.7% of candidates gaining a grade A or A*, compared with 25.2% in 2019.

=== Reforms ===
In response to concerns shown by employers and universities that it was not possible to distinguish exceptional candidates among the large number of students achieving A grades, and in order to mirror GCSE standards, a higher "super A" grade (like the A* grade at GCSE) was proposed in 2004. It was generally agreed that bringing in higher grades would be a better idea than raising the grade boundaries to keep the standards consistent, and it was proposed that on top of the A, an A* grade should be available at A-level in order to stretch the most able students while ensuring others are not disadvantaged. For modular A2 exams sat from 2010 onwards, the highest A-level grade is A*, requiring an A grade overall and 90% overall average UMS in A2 papers.

The 2004 reform of the Mathematics syllabus, following calls that it was too hard, attracted criticism. In the change, content consisting of three modules (Pure 1–3) was spread to four modules (Core 1–4). It was alleged that this made the course easier as students did less work for the same qualifications. Further reforms in 2006 to make the Mathematics syllabus more popular were met with mixed opinions. Supporters cited it would reverse the downward trend in students taking the subject whilst others were concerned that the subject was "still incredibly difficult".

Despite ongoing work to improve the image of A-levels in the business community, a number of business leaders expressed concern about the suitability of the qualification for school leavers and to urge the adoption of the International Baccalaureate in the UK as an alternative qualification at schools. Examples of concerns were those raised in 2009 by Sir Mike Rake, Chairman of BT Group, Sir Terry Leahy, Chairman of Tesco and by Sir Christopher Gent, Chairman of GlaxoSmithKline. Some schools have also moved to offering the Cambridge Pre-U as an alternative to A-levels and with higher tariffs.

=== Burden of assessment ===
With increased modularisation of subjects, the amount of time that young adults are spending being examined in the UK has risen considerably. It was estimated in a report by educationalists that by the age of 19 children will have spent an entire year of their school education being assessed. As a result of such criticisms about the "burden of assessment", since candidates have taken four papers for most A-levels, instead of six as in the past. This means that there are two modules for AS and two more for A2 for the majority of A-levels. However, this will not be the case for all A-levels: Biology, Human Biology, Chemistry, Physics, Electronics, Geology, Music, Welsh and Science will continue with six units, three units for AS and A2 respectively, and 600 UMS for the A-level. Mathematics (including Further Mathematics, Additional Further Mathematics, Statistics, and the Use of Mathematics AS), will not change structurally in the modular reform; it will stay on 600 UMS (300 UMS for AS), but it will include the new A* grade and the 'Stretch and Challenge' provision. Also, Bengali, Modern Hebrew, Punjabi, Polish, Arabic, Japanese, Modern Greek, Biblical Hebrew, Dutch, Gujarati, Persian, Portuguese, and Turkish will remain at two units, one for AS and one for A2. However, they will move to 200 UMS for A-level. Chinese will also move to 200 UMS, but instead of two units, it will move to three units: AS will have two units, A2 will have one. It is the first A-level to have an odd number of units since Curriculum 2000.

Cambridge University has warned that it is extremely unlikely that it will accept applicants who are taking two or more supposedly 'softer' A-level subjects out of 3. It has outlined a list of subjects it considers to be 'unsuitable', which includes Accounting, Design and Technology, Film Studies, Information and Communication Technology, Media Studies, Photography, and Sports studies.

As a result of dislike of the modular system, many schools now offer the alternative International Baccalaureate Diploma qualification. The course offers more subjects, extracurricular activity, a philosophical epistemological component known as "Theory of Knowledge", as well as the requirement of an extended essay on any subject of a candidate's choice. Unlike the current AS/A2 system, the International Baccalaureate is not based on a modular system. The Diploma Programme, administered by the International Baccalaureate, is a recognised pre-university educational programme.

Former British Prime Minister Tony Blair suggested in 2013 that one state school in every county should offer the International Baccalaureate Diploma Programme as an alternative to A-levels.

=== Breadth of study ===
The A-level has been criticised for providing less breadth since many A-level students do not generally study more than three subjects in their final year.^{[18]} A major part of this criticism is that, while a three- or four-subject curriculum can be balanced across the spectrum—for example, students may choose one science subject (e.g. Maths, Chemistry, or Biology), a language subject (e.g. English Language, English Literature, French, German, Spanish), and a "creative" subject (e.g. Art Studies)—in many cases students choose three closely linked subjects—for example, Mathematics, Physics and Chemistry or Sociology, Psychology, and Politics. This is in part due to university entrance requirements, which, for degree programs such as medicine, may require three related A-level subjects, but non-traditional combinations are becoming more common ("British Council Australia Education UK"). Thus, while the purpose of Curriculum 2000 was to encourage students to undertake contrasting subjects, to broaden their 'skill-base', there is a tendency to pursue similar disciplines. However, others disagree, arguing that the additional AS-level(s) studied would already have provided more breadth compared with the old system.

=== Predicted grading ===
Students applying to universities before receiving their A-level results typically do so on the basis of predicted grades, which are issued by schools and colleges. A student's predicted grades usually depend on their GCSE results, performance throughout the course, performance in tests and mock examinations, or a combination of these factors.

A possible reformation would be something called the post-qualifications applications system (PQA), where applicants apply to university after they receive their results. It has been argued that this would be fairer to applicants, especially those from lower-income families whose results were thought to be under-predicted. However, a more recent UCAS report shows that although the reliability of predicted grades declines in step with family income, this can still lead to an over-prediction effect for lower income groups. Just 45% of predicted grades are accurate – 47% are over-predictions and 9% under-predictions. A recent UCAS consultation rejected the implementation of PQA following opposition from universities, schools and awarding bodies.

=== Effects of COVID-19 pandemic, 2020 and 2021 ===
In 2020 the A-level system was challenged by the COVID-19 pandemic. Ofqual advised that the 2020 A-level exams should be cancelled, students be given a completion certificate, and universities widen the intake relying on a higher drop-out. The government intervened and grades were to be awarded using an algorithm. There was a public outcry, explained Roger Taylor the former chair of Ofqual who resigned. It was a “colossal error of judgment”: awarding grades calculated by algorithm was not acceptable to the public. Instead the final grades were awarded by teacher assessment, a system that was repeated in 2021. Taylor explained the algorithm was robust, it was the way it was being used that caused the problem: that was down to human decisions. Researchers from the London School of Economics and University College London researchers showed that teacher assessment gave a 15% advantage to students with graduate parents.

== See also ==
- GCE S-Level / Special level
- GCE Advanced Extension Award (AEA)
- A-level (International)
- Advanced Higher (Scotland)
- Higher School Certificate (United Kingdom)
- IB Diploma Programme
- European Baccalaureate
- T Level
- HKALE
