= UMS =

UMS may refer to:

== Medicine ==
- Ulnar–mammary syndrome, a skin condition characterized by underdevelopment of the apocrine and mammary glands

== Science, technology and business ==
- Underwriting management system, for automated insurance underwriting
- Unified messaging (system, server, or service), integration of different electronic messaging technologies into a single interface accessible from a variety of different devices
- Universal Media Server, a DLNA interoperable and Universal Plug and Play application software that seamlessly makes digital media available over a network
- Universal measurement system used for gross tonnage in shipping
- USB mass storage device class, a set of protocols for making a USB device accessible to a host computing device and enable file transfers
- User-mode scheduling, see preemption (computing)

== Companies and sports ==
- Universal Media Studios, an American television production company
- Universal Mobile Systems, an Uzbek–Russian telecommunications company
- UMS 1905 or Union Makes Strength, an Indonesian football club

== Countries ==
- Unfederated Malay States, former British protected states in the Malay Peninsula
- United Mexican States, the official name of Mexico

== Education ==
- Uniform Mark Scheme, way of standardising the marking of papers across different examination boards
- Muhammadiyah University of Surakarta (Universitas Muhammadiyah Surakarta) in Indonesia
- Universiti Malaysia Sabah in Malaysia
- University of Maine System, a U.S. state university system consisting of eight universities
- University of Mississippi in the U.S.
