= Daimonion =

Name given in ancient literature to an inner voice

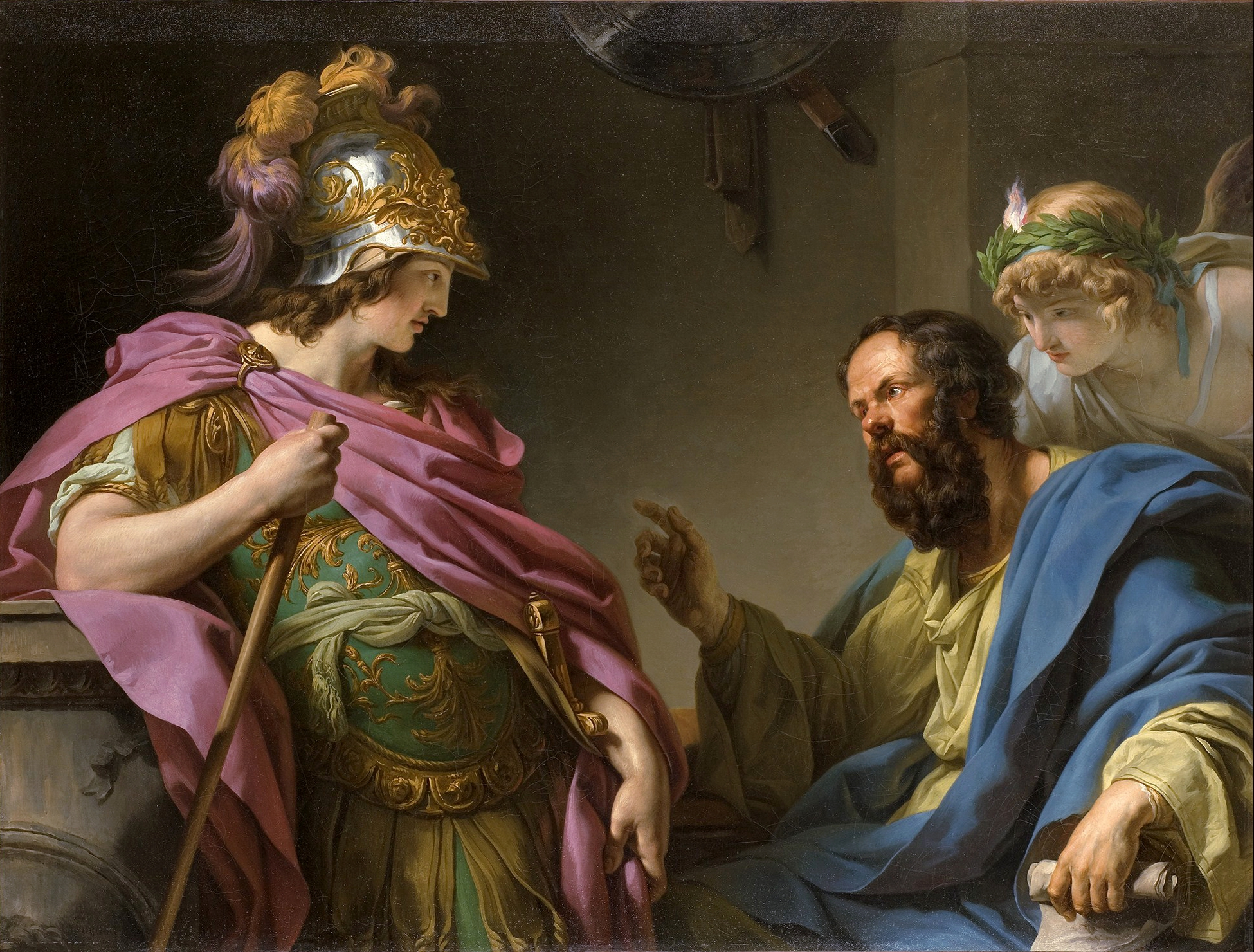
Socrates with Alcibiades and the Daimonion. Oil painting by François-André Vincent, 1776, in the Musée Fabre, Montpellier

Daimonion (Ancient Greek: δαιμόνιον, daimónion; Latin: genius) is the name given in ancient literature to an inner voice which, according to tradition, gave philosopher Socrates warning signs to prevent him from making wrong decisions. Socrates considered the originator of these signs to be a deity whom he did not specify. He followed the beckoning voice, which was always given without explanation and which, according to him, always proved to be useful and helpful. If the daimonion remained silent, he interpreted this as approval of his behavior. As he talked about his experiences with the inner advisor, his relationship with the mysterious entity was widely known in his hometown Athens. Opponents accused him of introducing a religious innovation. This accusation contributed to his being sentenced to death and executed in 399 BC.

Credible contemporary information on the daimonion is scarce. The main sources are descriptions by Socrates' pupils Plato and Xenophon. The phenomenon, already considered mysterious in antiquity, led to the creation of legends and gave rise to various explanations. Platonists regarded the sign giver as a high-ranking daimon, a divine spirit being that acted as the philosopher's personal guardian spirit. Christian authors saw the advisor partly as a guardian angel and partly as a malevolent demon.

In modern research, opinions differ on the interpretation of the sources. A central topic of discussion is the question of how Socrates could reconcile his claim to be guided only by reason with following unfounded advice of unclear origin.

== Meaning of the word ==
The word daimonion ('deity', 'demon') is the nounification of the neuter form of the adjective daimónios ('divine', 'demonic'), which is derived from the noun daimon (Greek δαίμων daímōn 'divine being', 'demon'). According to a widespread but controversial research opinion, Plato uses it as an elliptical expression, i.e. as an adjective, whereby the corresponding noun - in this case sign - is omitted. Then the meaning is the divine/demonic sign; meaning the communication of the inner voice. According to an alternative interpretation, Plato, like his contemporary Xenophon, uses the word as a noun with the meaning 'the divine in general', 'an undefined deity'. Then it is not the sign that is meant, but its creator.

In Greek mythology, popular religion and philosophy, a daimon is either a god or a god-like spirit being that occupies a middle position between gods and humans. Such an intermediary being, a "demon", can be helpful or hostile. They are therefore not demons in the sense of the Christian idea of the consistently malicious nature of all demons, which still persists today. In the sources, the term daimon is used in particular when talking about an influence from a superhuman sphere, which is not attributed to a specific known god, but to an unknown higher power. Accordingly, the corresponding adjective daimonios and its substantivization also refer to an unspecified divine entity. This vagueness is an important aspect of the philosophical use of words by the early Socratics, the disciples of Socrates. The vague, abstract term daimonion is intended to indicate that the signs of the divine authority are perceived, but that the originator itself remains obscure and can therefore only be described in general terms as "something divine". It is unclear whether the sign giver is one of the gods of popular religion or an independent "demonic" spirit being that makes contact with Socrates, or a mysterious, purely inner entity that only operates in Socrates' mind.

== Reports from the classical era ==
Common to all accounts of Socrates' contemporaries is that the daimonion appears as a warning authority that discourages individual mistakes without giving reasons or further explanation. The Daimonion's warnings are imperceptible to those around him; Socrates is the only one who hears the voice. He is only ever the passive recipient of surprising warning signals that "happen" to him. It never happens that he takes the initiative, asks for a sign or tries to learn something from the divine authority. In Plato's account, the daimonion's warnings relate exclusively to individual imminent decisions in the respective concrete situation; general knowledge is not imparted. Socrates interprets the absence of a warning sign as the tacit consent of the higher power to his current intention. Since the daimonion gives no reasons or evaluations, it bears no resemblance to a moral sense or a voice of conscience. His suggestions not only serve to avoid ethically relevant wrong decisions, they also generally prevent an "incorrect" approach, even in trivial cases, which would be unsuccessful or have negative consequences.

As Socrates used to tell his large circle of friends and acquaintances about his experiences with the higher power, they were generally known, and much talked about in Athens. The daimonion was one of the peculiarities that made Socrates stand out to his fellow citizens as a strange outsider.

The main contemporary sources are reports by two of Socrates' students, Plato and Xenophon. The most important information can be found in the Apology of Socrates, Plato's literary version of the defense speech that Socrates gave before the Athenian People's Court when he was accused of godlessness and seducing the youth in 399 BC. According to the Apology, the charge was that he disregarded the gods of the state cult and introduced new daimonia - divine beings, powers or effects - i.e. an illegal cult. This apparently referred to his daimonion.

In his defense speech, Socrates explains why he gives advice to private individuals but does not appear before the People's Assembly as an orator and advisor to the crowd and intervene in politics. The daimonion, his inner voice, rightly warned him against such political activity. The reason for this, in his view, is that someone like him, who is not prepared to accept injustice under any circumstances, must oppose the rulers in a democracy as well as in an oligarchy. However, one cannot be politically successful with such an attitude. Those who consistently stand up for Justice will even be killed if they interfere in politics, and that would serve no one.

In the Apology, Socrates describes the daimonion as "something divine and daimonic" that happens to him. According to him, the divine voice has only intervened since his childhood to dissuade him from certain intentions; it never makes recommendations. The Daimonion often interrupts him in the middle of a speech. So far, it has often intervened to dissuade him from doing something, always when he was about to misbehave, even on minor occasions. Socrates speaks of a "sign from the god" that always warns him against taking the wrong steps, but is now silent with regard to the trial and the impending death penalty. He concludes from the absence of the divine warning that the recklessness and frankness with which he appears in court and accepts a death sentence cannot be a bad thing and that there is no reason to consider death an evil. Otherwise the daimonion would have intervened and stopped him.

The daimonion is also mentioned in some of Plato's fictional, literary Dialogues, in which the author has his teacher Socrates appear as an interlocutor, the daimonion is mentioned. In the Euthyphro, we learn that the accusation against Socrates was based on the accusation that he was inventing new gods. This accusation referred to the philosopher's claim that he was hearing the divine voice. In the Euthydemus Socrates recounts that one day the "usual divine sign" prevented him from getting up and leaving the changing room of the Lykeion Gymnasion. Because he had stayed, a philosophical conversation then ensued with people who had come in. In the Politeia, Socrates alludes in passing to the daimonion's warning against political activity and remarks that he does not know whether he is the only person to receive such a sign. In the Phaedrus, the voice comes to stop Socrates from setting off on a walk; the reason is that he should first clear his conscience and rectify a transgression committed immediately beforehand. Socrates understands what the voice means, he already suspected it beforehand: he has spoken ill of the god Eros and thus committed a slander. He now has to recant this. In the Theaetetus, Socrates talks about pupils who had separated from him but later asked to be admitted again. In some of these cases, the daimonion had indicated to him that he should reject the petitioner.

The daimonion is also mentioned in First Alcibiades, a dialog written either by Plato himself or in his circle. There Socrates says that "a certain daimonic obstacle" had previously prevented him from approaching the young Alcibiades, but now it no longer put up any resistance. Apparently, according to Socrates, the deity had not allowed the conversation in the past because Alcibiades, the future famous politician and strategist, was still too immature and a meeting with him would therefore have been fruitless.

Xenophon gives a slightly different account in his Memoirs of Socrates. According to Xenophon's use of the word, daimonion is not to be understood as the divine sign, but the divine per se, the deity in general as the originator of the warnings. This does not refer to an entity personally assigned to Socrates. Xenophon's version partly confirms Plato's account; according to it too, Socrates used to claim that the daimonion gave him signs, which earned him the accusation from his accusers that he was disregarding traditional religion and introducing new kinds of divine beings. In contrast to Plato, however, Xenophon states that the signs of the daimonion not only concerned Socrates' own affairs, but also gave him advice for his friends and not only advised him against making wrong decisions, but also recommended good things. The outcome then showed that the advice benefited those who followed it, while others later regretted ignoring the divine advice. Xenophon counters the accusation of the philosopher's enemies that he had introduced an illegitimate religious innovation by claiming that the Daimonion's warnings were normal prophesies from the world of the generally recognized gods. A special feature of Xenophon's account is a detail for which he refers to Hermogenes, a student of Socrates. The already accused philosopher had replied to the suggestion to prepare his defense that the best justification was his previous life. He had initially planned to draft a speech for the trial, but then the daimonion disapproved of this intention. Socrates' statement to the court was therefore improvised.

As Cicero reports, the daimonion was often mentioned "in books by the Socratics". Apparently, the topic fascinated the philosopher's circle. With the exception of the works of Plato and Xenophon, this literature has not survived.

The Daimonion is discussed in detail in the Theages. This dialog was considered a work of Plato in antiquity, but in more recent research it is largely regarded as inauthentic. It was probably written in the 4th century. The unknown author describes a fictitious conversation in which Socrates talks to Demodokos, a respected citizen, and his ambitious son Theages. Demodokos wants his young son to be accepted among Socrates' pupils. However, the philosopher hesitates; he refers to the daimonion, recounts his previous experiences with this authority and wants to wait and see whether it will advise against it. The description of the divine voice given here largely corresponds to the information in Plato's real dialogues, but also differs from them in one important way: In the Theages, the function of the inner counselor is greatly expanded, as in Xenophon. In this dialog, the daimonion is not limited to advice concerning Socrates' personal affairs, but also enables the philosopher to warn others against harmful plans, such as disastrous military ventures. The deity behind the daimonion thus lends Socrates' words an additional authority that goes beyond his philosophical competence.

== Hellenistic and imperial interpretations ==
In the Roman imperial period at the latest, and to some extent as early as the 4th century BC, there was a change in the understanding of the phenomenon of the inner voice. In the contemporary accounts of Plato and Xenophon, the term daimonion had served to indicate the indeterminate, mysterious character of the divine author of the signs. In this way, the Socratics had evidently oriented themselves towards Socrates' authentic choice of words. This use of language was intended to prevent premature identification with a particular deity of mythology and popular religion. Imperial recipients, on the other hand, no longer adhered to this skeptical restraint; the Socratic daimonion was equated with the daimon, a personal patron god, and was thus given a clear purpose. This was the common interpretation among the Platonists of the imperial period. It was assumed that everyone, or at least every good person, had a daimon as a protector. The special nature of Socrates' inspirations was only seen in the exceptional quality of his relationship with his outstanding daimon. The daimonion of Socrates was thus integrated into the general demonology and interpreted within this framework. The phenomenon attracted particular attention because it provided an opportunity to explore the intertwining of the divine and the human. Attempts were made to find out what the divine voice was about and how it became effective.

According to Cicero, the Stoic Antipater of Tarsus, who lived in the 2nd century BC, was interested in the Daimonion of Socrates and collected numerous reports about it. Antipater's writing, a treatise on divination, was still known in Cicero's time, but is now lost.

Among the Epicureans, the traditional role of the daimonion met with fierce rejection. According to their doctrine, the gods did not interfere in human affairs. The Epicureans believed that Socrates, whom they judged extremely negatively, had invented the divine references out of bravado.

The Jewish historian Flavius Josephus mentioned in his writing On the Originality of Judaism (Against Apion)' the opinion held by "some" that Socrates' communications about the daimonion were meant in jest.

Around the turn of the 1st and 2nd centuries, the Middle Platonist Plutarch dealt with the riddle in detail. His Greek work On the Daimonion of Socrates is a philosophical dialog in which the participants discuss various attempts to explain the divine sign of Socrates. The fictional plot takes place two decades after the execution of the famous thinker. The starting point is a statement by Galaxidoros, a participant who considers communications from superhuman beings to be superstition. He praises Socrates, who relied only on his reason and evidence instead of paying attention to dreams, apparitions and prophecies. According to this, Socrates believed in the gods, but not in ghosts and fables, and was therefore in a position to put philosophy on a serious footing. However, one interlocutor countered this assessment by stating that the philosopher had followed the indications of his daimonion, which had proved to be justified, which could not be dismissed as a hoax in view of the eyewitness accounts. Galaxidoros tries to play down the phenomenon with a banal explanation: He assumes that Socrates only paid attention to an external sign, such as a sneeze, in certain cases of doubt, when none of the rational considerations could be decisive, and made his decision dependent on this. Although this interpretation is based on a tradition that allegedly originates from Socrates' circle, it is met with contradiction, as it seems to impute unworthy behavior to the great thinker. Galaxidoros has a clever reply to this. He argues that an insignificant omen in itself can herald a significant event, just as a minor symptom can be the sign of a serious illness or a light cloud can precede a storm. The discussion is then interrupted by a distraction, but the thread of the conversation is picked up again later. Now Simmias of Thebes, the host of the circle, presents a different interpretation. As a student of Socrates, Simmias has the authority of an eyewitness. He reports that although the teacher refused to provide more detailed information about his daimonion, his behavior provided an indication. He reacted negatively to accounts of visions, but was very interested in reports of divine voices. This led his circle of students to conclude that the daimonion was probably not an optical impression, but an inner voice or the mental perception of a silent message whose originator was a higher being. According to Simmias' theory, the messages did indeed enter Socrates' consciousness while he was awake, but this happened in the same way as one receives the ideas and mental perceptions of certain words in a dream and believes to hear them, although no actual voice is heard. In principle - according to Simmias' hypothesis - such voices are also perceptible to other people, but there is an obstacle to this: "the lack of harmony, the restlessness within themselves". Only those who have "an undisturbed mind and a soul not stirred by storms", i.e. who, like Socrates, are not under the compulsion of affects, can hear the messages. Simmias explains the special position of Socrates with the extraordinary receptivity of this man. His mind was pure and unclouded by passions and therefore highly sensitive and capable of absorbing every impression very quickly.

Plutarch did not strictly adhere to the tradition in Plato's Apology, according to which the daimonion only ever advised and never recommended anything. With him, the divine voice takes on an advisory function that goes beyond mere warning and dissuasion.

In the third quarter of the 2nd century, the Middle Platonist Apuleius, a writer and orator, wrote the Latin treatise De deo Socratis (On the God of Socrates), the written version of a lecture in which he presented his doctrine of demons. In this context, he dealt with the daimonion, among other things. He believed that the "divine sign" referred to by Plato was probably something visible, meaning that Socrates perceived his daimon not only with his ears but also with his eyes. According to this demonological model, the daimon can appear to man as an external figure, but usually manifests itself internally as an inner voice; it dwells "in the manner of conscience" directly in the innermost part of the soul. In the case of Socrates, the daimon contented itself with warnings, as this man was such an accomplished sage that he needed no guidance to fulfill his tasks. In Apuleius, Socrates' special position as a privileged recipient of divine messages is clearly relativized. He does not appear as a unique favorite of the deity, but as a role model to emulate and to become like. In principle, every human being is capable of becoming a philosopher like Socrates and, like him, of entering into a close relationship with the divine realm, because everyone has their own daimon, a helpful guardian spirit and advisor, to whom they should orient themselves in the same way as the great Athenian did with his daimonion.

Another Middle Platonist who dealt with the subject was the rhetorician Maximos of Tyre, who lived in the late 2nd century. In one of his speeches, he discussed the daimonion of Socrates, addressing skeptics who doubted the reality of the phenomenon. He presented it as a prophesying entity that was no more astonishing than the generally esteemed, well-known Oracles. Like Apuleius, he drew a parallel to a comparable phenomenon in Homer's Iliad, where the goddess Athena appears to Achilles. According to Maximos' interpretation, this is a real, helpful daimon who assisted the philosopher as a guardian spirit. According to this interpreter, this is nothing unique, it is not a special feature of Socrates, because outstanding personalities are, according to the will of the gods, in the care of personal daimonic helpers.

In the late 2nd and early 3rd century, the Christian apologist Tertullian, who wanted to expose the entire tradition of the extraordinary wisdom of Socrates as a deception in order to discredit philosophy by criticizing its outstanding representative. According to his account, the daimonion was a real being that exerted a corrupting influence and prevented the fame-seeking philosopher from turning to the good. Tertullian saw a "demonic" power at work in the sense of the Christian idea that demons are diabolical creatures that only cause mischief. The daimonion worked together with Apollo, who was also such an evil demon. With his explanations, Tertullian initiated the Christian interpretation that places the daimonion among the evil demons. The apologist Minucius Felix, who probably wrote the dialog Octavius in the first half of the 3rd century, also thought so. The author of the Cyprian of Carthage († 258) attributed the treatise Quod idola dii non sint also considered the phenomenon to be diabolical. In contrast, a contemporary of Tertullian, the Church Father Clement of Alexandria, saw the daimonion as a guardian angel.

== Late antique interpretations ==
The late antiques Neoplatonists dealt with the interpretation of the daimonion in their Plato commentaries. According to their demonology, which is based on Plato's concept, every human being is assigned a daimon as a constant companion, guardian spirit and controller of fate. Socrates, as an exemplary human being, had a particularly exalted spiritual guide who was more than a middle being between humans and gods; his advisor was a god.

In the 4th or early 5th century, the scholar Calcidius took up the comparison with the apparent hearing of voices in dreams in his commentary on Plato's Timaeus.

In the 5th century, the influential Neoplatonist Proclus dealt with the topic in detail in his commentary on the First Alcibiades. He discussed the nature of communication between the philosopher and his guardian spirit and the question of why the daimonion only advised and never rebuked. He emphasized that the divine voice did not come from outside, as in ordinary human hearing, but from within. It had limited itself to warnings and gave no suggestions because Socrates did not need any incentive to do good deeds. Socrates' protective spirit belonged to the realm of the purifying power of the god Apollo. He was particularly thorough in his investigation of a problem that the renowned Neoplatonist Iamblichos and Proklos' teacher Syrianos had already grappled with: the question of why the daimonion allowed Socrates to associate with an unworthy person like Alcibiades.

Another Neoplatonic scholar who commented on the divine sign was Hermeias of Alexandria, who, like Proclus, had attended Syrianos' classes. Hermeias dealt with the subject in his commentary on Plato's Phaedrus. He emphasized that the daimonion was neither a part of the soul nor philosophy personified, as some believed. Rather, it was the personal guardian spirit. According to Hermeias, everyone has one, but only disciplined philosophers manage to notice its presence. What is required is a virtuous way of life and turning towards the divine realm, as practiced by Socrates. The messages of the daimonion are not heard with the physical ear, but are grasped through an act of perception of the soul by means of the soul vehicle. The reason why Socrates' divine advisor limited himself to advising against it was his respect for human self-determination. If the daimonion had not only warned but also advised, the result would have been that the philosopher would have behaved like an unreasonable and alien being who does nothing of his own accord.

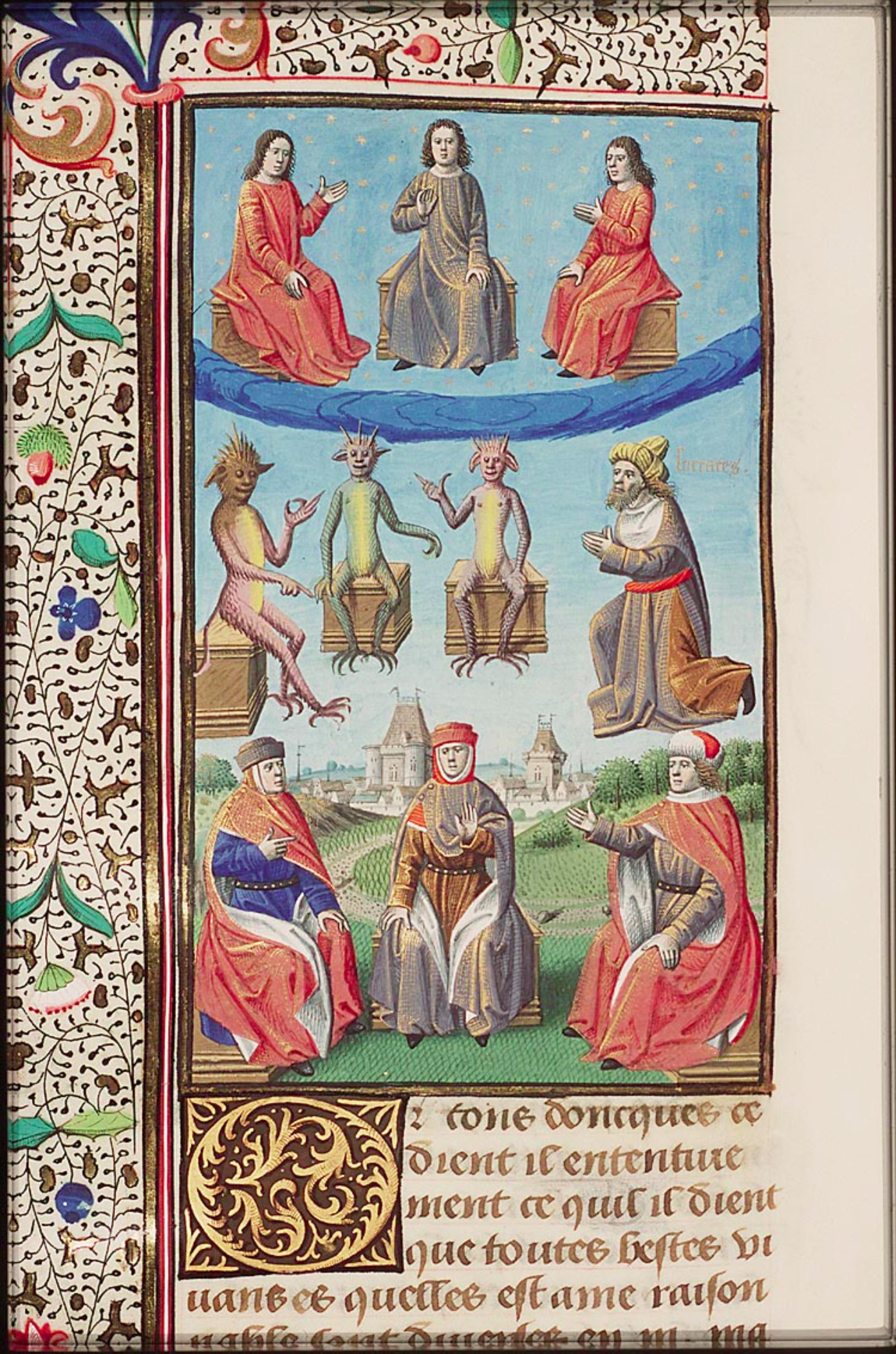
Socrates (center right) addresses demons. The image shows the negative interpretation of the daimonion in the Middle Ages. Illumination in a manuscript of the French translation of Augustine's treatise On the State of God, produced by Raoul de Presles in 1371-1375. The Hague, Museum Meermanno, 10 A 11, fol. 380v (late 15th century)

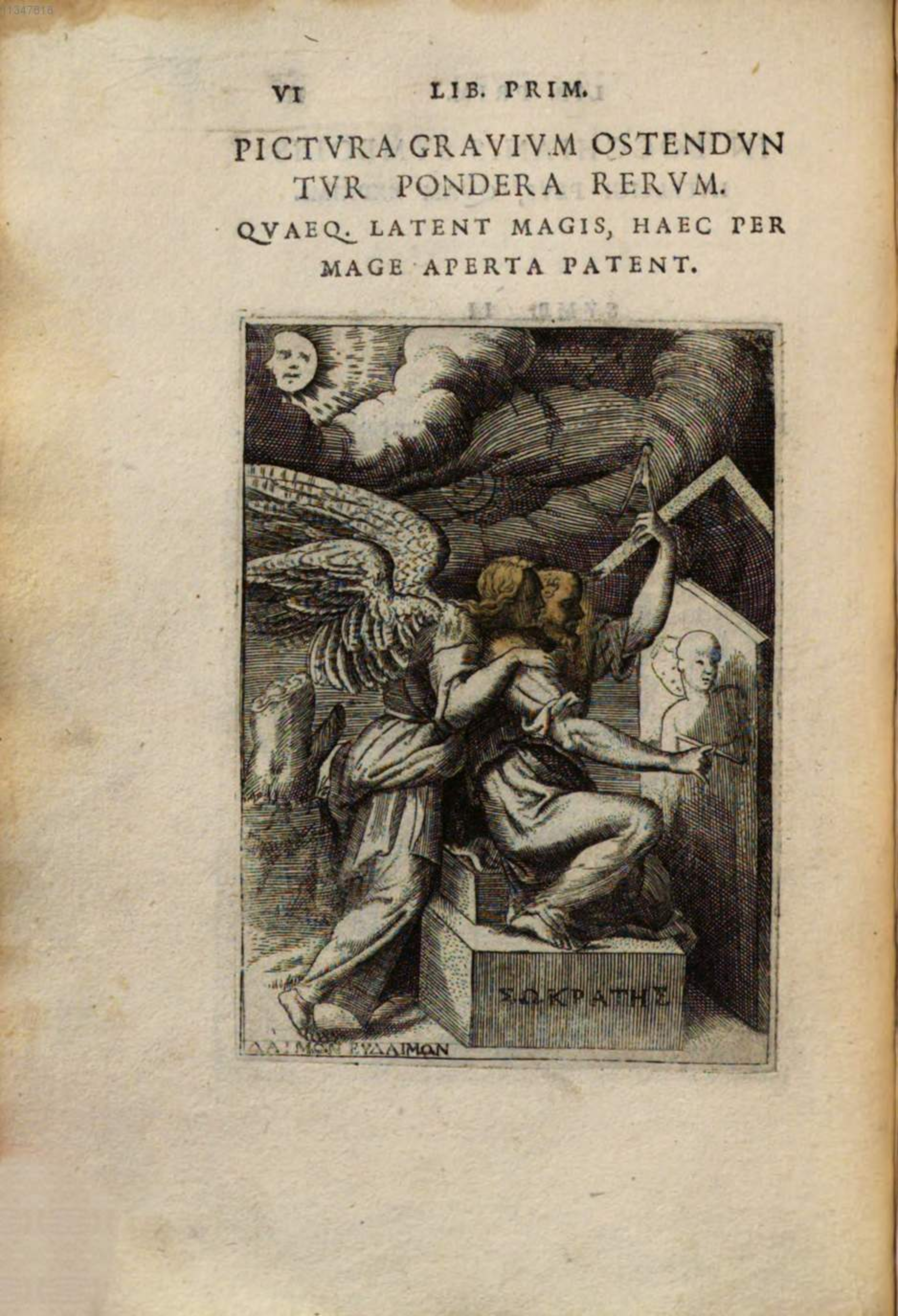
Socrates with his Daimonion. Engraving by Giulio Antonio Bonasone in Achille Bocchi's work Symbolicarum quaestionum de universo genere, quas serio ludebat, libri quinque, Bologna 1555.

In the 6th century, one of the last pagan Neoplatonists, Olympiodorus the Younger, only briefly discussed the daimonion in his commentary on the First Alcibiades.

Late antique church writers also commented on the phenomenon. They held different interpretations. In the early 4th century, the church father Eusebius of Caesarea considered the possibility that the daimonion had the function of a guardian angel for Socrates. His contemporary Lactance, on the other hand, a renowned apologist, counted the daimonion among the evil demons. In the early 5th century, Augustine polemicized against Apuleius' doctrine of demons in his work The State of God. He was convinced that all demons were evil and opposed Apuleius' assertion that Socrates' inner voice was that of a benevolent demon. For Augustine, there were only two possibilities: Either Socrates' counselor was not a demon or he was bad.

== Medieval and modern reception ==
=== Middle Ages and early modern times ===
In the Early and High Middle Ages, the relevant works of Plato and Xenophon, as well as later Greek literature, were unknown to the Latin-speaking scholars of Western and Central Europe. However, they were able to glean information on the subject from Apuleius' On the God of Socrates and Augustine's polemic.

The humanist Giannozzo Manetti, who in 1440 wrote the first biography of Socrates since antiquity, described the daimonion according to the ancient sources available to him. Citing Plato's "truthful" account, Manetti argued that the daimonion was a guardian or guardian angel that Socrates had received at birth.

The humanist and Platonist Marsilio Ficino (1433-1499) dealt extensively with the demonology of ancient Platonism and in particular with the doctrine of the personal demon as the guardian spirit of man. He primarily dealt with the demonology of Proclus. He dealt with the Socratic daimonion in the greatest detail in his short commentary (argumentum) on Plato's Apology. Following on from the ideas of the Neoplatonists of late antiquity, he stated that the demon of Socrates was a Saturnian fire spirit and belonged to the highest class in the hierarchical ranking of guardian spirits. These spirits were so exalted that they were referred to as gods. Outstanding philosophers such as Socrates and Plotinus had such companions. Ficino also discussed the question of how to imagine "hearing" the voice of the guardian spirit. His intention was to integrate this Platonic thought into his Christian world view.

The humanist philosopher Michel de Montaigne (1533-1592), who admired Socrates, was cautious about the daimonion. According to him, the sign of the ancient thinker was "a certain impulse of the will that arose in him without waiting for the advice of his reason". These impulses may have been rash and disorderly, but they were probably always significant and worthy of being followed. Montaigne thought that everyone felt the shadowy images of such impulses of a suddenly impetuous thought. He himself, as he reports, had such impulses, albeit less frequently than Socrates, and had followed them to his happiness and benefit. One might therefore think that they had something of divine inspiration.

In 1754, Denis Diderot addressed the issue of intuitive abilities in the study of nature in his Pensées sur l'interprétation de la Nature (Thoughts on the Interpretation of Nature). According to him, great skill in experimentation confers an intuition that has the character of inspiration. If one is mistaken about it like Socrates, it is called a familiar demon. Socrates had such an amazing skill in judging people and weighing up circumstances that even in the most difficult cases a quick and correct combination secretly took place within him. This enabled him to make a prediction from which the event itself hardly deviated. Diderot compared this process to the sense of intuition in experimental physics. He asked how the ability to "sense" new procedures and experiments and future results with the power of intuition could be transferred to another person. His answer was that the person with the gift would first have to look inside themselves in order to clearly recognize what it consists of and then replace the "familiar demon" with clear, understandable concepts and explain these to others. The ability could, for example, concern the presupposition or perception of opposites or analogies between objects considered individually or the recognition of interactions between things considered in context.

Voltaire considered the daimonion to be a charlatanry of Socrates; he believed it to be a superstition.

The motif was taken up sporadically in painting. In a 1776 oil painting by François-André Vincent, Socrates talks to Alcibiades while the angelic Daimonion whispers to him from behind. The Danish painter Nicolai Abildgaard created an oil painting in 1784 that shows Socrates with two shadowy spirits, his daimonion and a malevolent demon. The daimonion prevents the demon from addressing the philosopher. The motif of the good and bad spirits accompanying the man comes from the depiction in Giannozzo Manetti's biography of Socrates.

=== 19th century ===
Friedrich Schleiermacher found that the daimonion was not a personal character or an appearance of any kind. Rather, it was "the authentic domain of such quick moral judgments that cannot be traced back to clear reasons, and which he [Socrates] therefore did not attribute to his actual self".

Georg Wilhelm Friedrich Hegel dealt with the subject in depth. In his Lectures on the History of Philosophy, he emphasized the subjective, particular character of the daimonion. The "famous genius of Socrates", a "so much conjured up bizarreness of his imagination", should by no means be thought of as a guardian spirit or angel or as a conscience. For Hegel, conscience is "the idea of general individuality, of the spirit that is certain of itself, which is at the same time general truth". The "demon of Socrates", on the other hand, is the "quite necessary other side", the "individuality of the spirit". It stands in the middle between the outwardness of the oracles and the purely inwardness of the spirit. In Hegel's understanding, the daimonion made Socrates a forerunner of modern subjectivity. Despite this forward-looking aspect, however, the Berlin philosopher was critical of the phenomenon; he regarded it as an expression of a pathological condition and found that "Socrates is driven." Hegel's disparaging judgment was based on the content of the messages of the "divine voice", in their limitation to advice on "particular successes" and thus on "coincidences" instead of a reference to universality. After all, Hegel saw the daimonion as the beginning of the fact that "the will, which previously only placed itself beyond itself, relocated itself within itself and recognized itself within itself". This was "the beginning of self-knowing and thus true freedom". Søren Kierkegaard analyzed the phenomenon in detail in his dissertation of 1841. According to his findings, Plato's account, according to which the voice only ever intervened as a warning, is preferable to the "thoughtlessness" of Xenophon, who added a driving role. The word daimonion is the expression for something quite abstract that acts in the manner of an instinct. Socrates substituted this abstraction for the concrete individuality of the gods, thereby entering into a polemical relationship with the state religion. Thus the accusation on this point corresponded to the facts; "the demonic" denotes "Socrates' entirely negative relationship to the existing in religious terms". From Kierkegaard's point of view, the daimonion must be evaluated critically. Socrates was able to make do with it, it provided him with security, but this was "merely the egoistic satisfaction of a particular personality". Kierkegaard judged that one could see here that "subjectivity is brought to a standstill in its outpouring", that it "closes itself off in a particular personality".

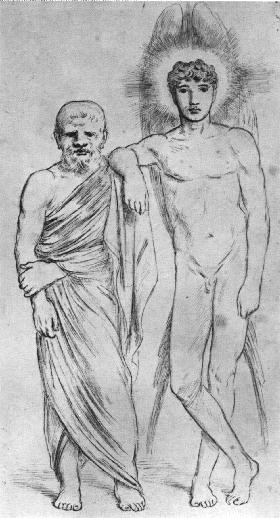
Socrates with his daimonion. Drawing by Simeon Solomon, around 1865, in the Victoria and Albert Museum, London

Arthur Schopenhauer attempted to explain the phenomenon in the context of his theory of premonitions. According to him, negative premonitions and forebodings are the effects of "theorematic" dreams that take place in deep sleep and of which nothing remains in consciousness but their impression on the mind, which lingers "as a prophesying premonition, as a dark foreboding". Such an impression takes possession of the person when the first circumstances connected with the misfortune seen in the dream occur in reality. For Schopenhauer, this fits in with the always admonishing intervention of Socrates' inner voice. Friedrich Nietzsche included the Daimonion in his scathing judgment of Socrates. He described it as "auditory hallucinations" that had been interpreted as religious. This was one of the characteristics of Socrates' decadence. The phenomenon is perhaps "a suffering of the ear, which he only interprets differently according to his prevailing moral way of thinking". Nietzsche believed he had found a key to the essence of Socrates in the admonishing function of the inner voice. According to him, the "instinctive wisdom" of this "utterly abnormal nature" only manifested itself in order to hinder conscious cognition. While instinct is the creative-affirmative force in all productive people and consciousness acts critically and admonishingly, in Socrates instinct became the critic and consciousness the creator. Nietzsche saw this as a monstrous defect.

Only occasionally did the daimonion serve as a motif in the visual arts. The British Pre-Raphaelite Simeon Solomon created the drawing Socrates and his Agathodaemon around 1865. Here, the angelic guardian spirit stands next to the philosopher as a naked young man.

=== 20th and 21st century ===
In 20th and 21st century research, the material in Plato's works usually forms the starting point for investigations into the Daimonion, while Xenophon's information is only used as a supplement. It is assumed that, contrary to Xenophon's account, the Daimonion actually only admonished, as Plato claims, and never advised, although the advice against can also be understood as encouragement to behave in the opposite way. This weighting of the sources is related to the fact that Plato's image of Socrates is generally favored when attempting to reconstruct the philosophical position of the historical Socrates. In addition, Plato was present at the trial and Xenophon was not. However, some historians of philosophy expressly refrain from passing judgment on the question of whether Xenophon's version might not offer an at least partially better tradition. In the second half of the 20th century and in the 21st century, the question of how Socrates was able to reconcile respect for the authority of the daimonion with his claim to be convinced only by plausible arguments has been discussed in philosophical-historical discourse. Different proposed solutions have triggered controversial discussions. Ulrich von Wilamowitz-Moellendorff (1919) considered the always admonishing intervention of the inner voice to be an indication of Socrates' impulsiveness, which he learned to control. The philosopher had acquired the ability to heed such inner warnings through self-control, "which was very necessary for his passionate nature". Some of his students believed him to have a real gift of sight and attached an accompanying, servant demon to him. They would not have accepted any authority beside him and only paid homage to the new demon. This ultimately led to accusations of godlessness and a bad influence on young people, which proved to be Socrates' undoing at the trial.

According to the judgment of Werner Jaeger (1944), the Daimonion proves that, in addition to his intellectual ability, Socrates possessed "the instinctive to the highest degree, which rationalism so often lacks". This, and not the voice of conscience, is the significance of the daimonion. Olof Gigon (1947) saw the daimonion primarily as a historical phenomenon, a trait of the historical Socrates, who believed in the sign. For the early "Socrates poetry", the tradition of the first generation of Socratics, in which "the pure factuality of what happened is elevated to symbolic meaning through interpretation and reinterpretation", such a move was not necessary, as they accepted it, or "rather in such a way [...] came to terms with it", without fully exploiting its "dramatic and spiritual possibilities". It was only later that the daimonion was interpreted as a special phenomenon against the background of a general speculative demonology. Karl Jaspers (1957) located the daimonion beyond the rational realm. According to his account, there were specific unique situations in which Socrates could not justify a decision through right thinking. He therefore needed divine help, and this formed "the limit at which there is obedience without insight". The voice brought him no knowledge and he followed it without insight. It was not an objective authority, but incommunicable. Therefore, he could not refer to it for justification, but only report on it as an indication.

A completely different assessment was reached by Martha Nussbaum (1986). She believed that the daimonion was not a god in the traditional sense, but - as a neuter - a "divine thing", namely human reason as a middle thing "between the animal that we are and the god that we could be". It was an ironic allusion to the authority of reason, which for Socrates was the only decisive authority and which for him was the "god" who really deserved respect.

Gernot Böhme (1988) pointed out that Socrates could easily have described the beckoning of the inner voice as whispers or warnings from the gods. Instead, he expressed himself very vaguely and extremely cautiously. He insisted on the phenomenon, but refused to attribute it to the traditional originators, the gods. According to Böhme, his strikingly reduced way of speaking is a product of the Enlightenment, which is already behind him. It was also understood in this way by his accusers when they accused him of not worshipping the gods of the city. For Böhme, the daimonion necessarily belongs to the "type of man" embodied by Socrates. This type isolated itself from heterogeneous impulses to act - be they divine impulses or impulses originating from the unconscious - in order to appear as the perpetrator of its own deeds. But precisely as the type that is organized by consciousness, it is particularly sensitive to the heterogeneous drives that it finds within itself. The daimonion is to be understood as the last residue of such impulses, not as a deeper self of Socrates, for he experiences it as something that he is not himself. As a conscious person, he has taken over all positive impulses to act into his self. The negative ones, which "are simply a no", come from a realm of which he is not master, over which he cannot give an account, but which he accepts. He wanted to suppress the irrational, but came up against the limits of this program and then preferred to develop forms of dealing with the irrational instead of denying it.

Gregory Vlastos (1989, 1991) considered the daimonion to be an "extra-rational" source of information, but found that the coexistence of rational deliberation and the divine voice was not a problem, because Socrates did not have two different systems of justifying assumptions. According to Vlastos' interpretation, for the philosopher the indications of the daimonion were not a source of ethical certainty independent of and superior to reason. Rather, he interpreted the signs in the light of his critical reason. They provided him with subjective confirmation, but never carried such weight that they could have changed his rationally justified decisions. Only the reasons of reason were decisive.

The interpretation put forward by Vlastos was contradicted by Thomas C. Brickhouse and Nicholas D. Smith (1994), who argued that the daimonion opposed rational but nevertheless wrong decisions and prevented them from being carried out. According to the findings of Michael Bingenheimer (1993), however, the possibility of a conflict between reason and the divine voice assumed by Brickhouse and Smith did not exist. Bingenheimer interpreted the experience of the daimonion as a certainty of Socrates arising from the religious sphere that his actions and thoughts were in accordance with the divine world order - "the expression of a happy personality for whom rational and religious action coincide".

Franz Vonessen (1993) came to the conclusion that the daimonion was not a special entity, but the voice of a daimon. According to Vonessen's understanding of Plato's explanations, this is not a deity approaching Socrates from outside, but is to be found within him as an inner god: The daimon is identical with reason. Reason is indeed given to every human being and thus everyone has such a personal daimon, but not everyone is in living contact with the divine that dwells within him. The special position of Socrates, who was the only one to hear the divine voice, is, in the view of the Platonists, due to the fact that he attained wisdom to the extent that it can be attained by humans: "This means that for him reason is no longer above the ego, but the ego coincides with it, with the highest part of the soul."

Mark L. McPherran (1996) agreed with Vlastos that the signs were extra-rational phenomena and that Socrates subjected them to scrutiny whenever possible. However, they should not be reduced to a mere emotional hunch, as is the case with Vlastos' interpretation. Rather, for Socrates they were certainly the basis for the construction of claims to a particular moral knowledge, and he assumed that there was a rational basis for this knowledge, even though he could not assume infallibility. McPherran's reasoning is as follows: as the signs always referred to future events that could not be predicted at the time, or only to a limited extent, it was entirely compatible with a rational attitude to place trust in such indications. The reliability of the source of information could be checked retrospectively, and since it was always confirmed, the decision to continue to trust it was rationally justifiable.

Richard Kraut (2000) came to a similar conclusion. He believed that Socrates critically examined the reliability of his inner voice over a longer period of time and only then entrusted himself to its guidance. His attitude was therefore rationally justified. Kraut emphasized that the disconcerting effect of the philosopher's statements in court was inevitable, as his claim to a unique divine private revelation came across as arrogant and was a challenge for conservative religious circles.

C. David C. Reeve (2000) identified the author of the Daimonion's warnings with the god Apollo. At least this applies to the point of view of Plato's dialogical figure Socrates, regardless of the question of his relationship to the historical person.

Thomas C. Brickhouse and Nicholas D. Smith (2005) opposed Vlastos' "reductionist" approach, which did not do justice to the source evidence, and countered it with an empiricist, "reliabilist" interpretation. According to this, Socrates was able to come to the rational conclusion that the Daimonion's indications were reliable and helpful on the basis of a multitude of experiences, even if he had no knowledge of their origin and the reason for their reliability. The empirical evidence was sufficient to justify this conclusion.

Mark Joyal (2005) recalled the importance of the "Socratic problem", the general uncertainty about the views of the historical Socrates. He pointed out that this uncertainty also affects the understanding of the daimonion. The debates revolve around the image of Socrates in the literary source under discussion, while the question of historical truth remains open.

Anthony A. Long (2006) argued against Vlastos' view that Socrates' commitment to reason could not be reconciled with the assumption of an irrational daimonion. It can therefore be assumed that the philosopher regarded the actions of this authority and his observance of the warnings as rational. In many cases, he found clear reasons that made the inner voice's advice seem reasonable. The background to this was his conviction that human reason was of divine origin and therefore in harmony with the aspirations of the deity and that a divine voice, by its very nature, could only proclaim what was reasonable. Numerous experiences had reinforced this understanding and the reliability of the warnings had given him a good reason to trust the source of information.

Further research discussions revolve around the questions of whether the voice of the daimonion can be assigned to one of the traditional gods of Greek mythology, such as Apollo, as Luc Brisson (2005) believes, and whether the communicator is an omniscient world leader, as Mark L. McPherran (2005) believes, or whether it is only an inner authority that does not intervene from the outside world, but is only active in the mind of Socrates, as Gerd Van Riel (2005) assumes.

== Literature ==
Essay collections

- Pierre Destrée, Nicholas D. Smith (Hrsg.): Socrates’ Divine Sign: Religion, Practice, and Value in Socratic Philosophy. Academic Printing and Publishing, Kelowna 2005, ISBN 0-920980-91-0
- Nicholas D. Smith, Paul B. Woodruff (Hrsg.): Reason and Religion in Socratic Philosophy. Oxford University Press, Oxford 2000, ISBN 0-19-513322-6

Studies on reception in the classical periodEssay collections

- Anthony A. Long: How Does Socrates’ Divine Sign Communicate with Him? In: Sara Ahbel-Rappe, Rachana Kamtekar (Hrsg.): A Companion to Socrates. Blackwell, Malden 2006, ISBN 1-4051-0863-0, p. 63–74
- Mark A. Joyal: ‘The Divine Sign Did Not Oppose Me’: A Problem In Plato’s Apology? In: Mark Joyal (Hrsg.): Studies in Plato and the Platonic Tradition. Essays Presented to John Whittaker. Ashgate, Aldershot 1997, ISBN 0-86078-647-1, p. 43–58

Studies on post-classical reception

- Klaus Döring: Plutarch und das Daimonion des Sokrates. In: Mnemosyne 37, 1984, p. 376–392
- Mark Joyal: Tradition and Innovation in the Transformation of Socrates’ Divine Sign. In: Lewis Ayres (Hrsg.): The Passionate Intellect. Transaction, New Brunswick/London 1995, ISBN 1-56000-210-7, p. 39–56
- Geert Roskam: Voice or Vision? Socrates’ Divine Sign and Homeric Epiphany in Late Platonism and Beyond. In: American Journal of Philology 135, 2014, p. 359–385
- Geert Roskam: Socrates’ δαιμόνιoν in Maximus of Tyre, Apuleius, and Plutarch. In: Françoise Frazier, Delfim F. Leão (Hrsg.): Tychè et Pronoia. La marche du monde selon Plutarque. Centro de Estudos Clássicos e Humanísticos da Universidade de Coimbra, Coimbra 2010, ISBN 978-989-8281-52-4, p. 93–108
