= Klaus Döring =

German classical philologist and historian of philosophy

Klaus Döring (born 5 April 1938 in Hamburg) is a German classical philologist and philosophical historian.

== Life and work ==
Döring studied Classical philology, philosophy and musicology at the Universities of Kiel, Würzburg, Hamburg and Freiburg from 1957 to 1964. In 1964 he took the first state examination in Greek and Latin. From 1966, he worked at the University of Freiburg, initially in an assistant position. After he received his doctorate in 1970, he became an Academic Assistant. In 1976 he achieved his habilitation in classical philology at Freiburg. From 1978 to 1980 he completed a clerkship at the South Baden higher education authority. In 1980 he was appointed to the academic council of the University of Freiburg.

In 1981, Döring became Professor of Classical Philology (Greek) at the University of Bamberg. In 2003 he retired.

Döring's research focus was ancient Greek philosophy and its contemporary reception. He focused on the various philosophical schools and movements (Sophism, Socrates, the Socratics, Plato, Cynicism and Stoicism). Until 1999 he was editor of the Antike Naturwissenschaft und ihre Rezeption (AKAN) series with Bernard Herzhoff and Georg Wöhrle.

== Selected publications ==
- Die Megariker. Kommentierte Sammlung der Testimonien [The Megarians: Annotated Collection of Testimonia]. Amsterdam 1972 (Dissertation, Universität Freiburg 1970).
- Exemplum Socratis. Studien zur Sokratesnachwirkung in der kynisch-stoischen Popularphilosophie der frühen Kaiserzeit und im frühen Christentum [Exemplum Socratis: Studies on the Reception of Socrates in the Cynic-Stoic Popular Philosophy of the Early Imperial Period and in Early Christianity]. Wiesbaden 1979 (Habilitationsschrift, Universität Freiburg).
- Der Sokratesschüler Aristipp und die Kyrenaiker [The Socratic Scholar Aristippus and the Cyrenaeans]. Stuttgart 1988.
- with Hellmut Flashar, George B. Kerferd, Carolin Oser-Grote and Hans-Joachim Waschkies: Die Philosophie der Antike. Band 2,1: Sophistik, Sokrates, Sokratik, Mathematik, Medizin [The Philosophy of Antiquity: Volume 2.1: Sophism, Socrates, Socratics, Mathematics, Medicine]. Basel 1998.
- (Platon), Theages. Übersetzung und Kommentar [(Plato) Theages. Translation and Commentary]. Göttingen 2004.
- Die Kyniker [The Cynics]. Bamberg 2006.
- Kleine Schriften zur antiken Philosophie und ihrer Nachwirkung [Shorter works on Ancient Philosophy and its Reception]. Stuttgart 2010, ISBN 978-3-515-09328-6.

Co-edited works

- with Wolfgang Kullmann: Studia Platonica. Festschrift für Hermann Gundert zu seinem 65. Geburtstag am 30. April 1974 [Studia Platonica: Festschrift for Hermann Gundert on his 65th Birthday on 30 April 1974]. Amsterdam 1974.
- with Theodor Ebert: Dialektiker und Stoiker. Zur Logik der Stoa und ihrer Vorläufer [Dialectic and Stocisim: On the Logic of the Stoa and its Predecessors]. Stuttgart 1993.
- with Michael Erler and Stefan Schorn: Pseudoplatonica. Akten des Kongresses zu den Pseudoplatonica vom 6.–9. Juli 2003 in Bamberg [Pseudoplatonica: Acts of the Congress on the Pseudoplatonica on 6–9 July 2003 in Bamberg]. Stuttgart 2005.
