= Critical understanding =

Part of education theory

Critical understanding is a term used commonly in education to define a mode of thinking, described as, ‘an essential tool for participating in democratic processes, at whatever level.’ It is a defensible position reached through the examination of ideas, issues or sources. It is achieved through reflecting upon, analysing and evaluating different ideas and positions, and is demonstrated through an ability to express informed responses and independent thought. Critical understanding develops through analytical and independent thought and is considered an increasingly important element of the education process as students progress to higher and further education. However it is not an easy concept to communicate for it is not a passive thing we do; it is about active engagement.

== Meaning ==
Critical understanding is a cerebral mode of comprehension, it is a way of thinking, and thus is not dependent upon external expression. Yet it requires external manifestation in order to be communicated. The expression of critical understanding can take various forms including formal or informal speech, academic writing, creative prose or poetry or visual outcomes. It can take different forms in different cultures and this needs to be taken into consideration when assessing critical results. The term "critical" in this context is not meant in a negative sense; rather it outlines a process of thinking. Critical understanding is used to define the process of formulating and understanding a complex problem or difficult set of ideas. In a general sense, it is, ‘a consequence of men’s [sic] beginning to reflect about their own capacity for reflection, about the world, about their position in the world.’

== Context ==
The notion of critical understanding is closely related to the concept of Critical Thinking, described as, ‘reasonable reflective thinking focused on deciding what to believe or do.’ Critical thinking has also been described as, ‘thinking about thinking’, specifically in relation to John Dewey’s work on ‘the problem of training thought’. Critical understanding has its roots in the notion of pluralism, the idea of multiple approaches, methods and interpretations in which dialogue plays an important role. In a pedagogical sense it is closely linked to the theory of Education for Critical Consciousness, outlined by Paulo Freire, Brazilian educator and critical theorist, who wrote, ‘Only dialogue, which requires critical thinking, is also capable of generating critical thinking. Without dialogue there is no communication, and without communication there can be no true education.’

== Critical understanding and secondary education (UK) ==
In secondary education in the UK, critical understanding can be used as an umbrella term to define thinking skills which encourage children to, ‘have enquiring minds and think for themselves to process information, reason, question and evaluate’

Students’ ability to apply critical thought to a given task is important across the curriculum. Although not always explicitly labelled students are encouraged to develop thinking skills that develop from simple identification to successful evaluation. This follows Bloom's Taxonomy, outlined in the standard text, Taxonomy of educational objectives: the classification of educational goals. This taxonomy is a classification of learning objectives aimed to motivate educators to develop teaching and learning styles that will develop students’ evaluative skills and critical understanding.

== Critical understanding in art and design (UK) ==
In art and design, the term critical understanding is explicitly outlined. The National Curriculum (England, Wales and Northern Ireland) programme of study for Key Stage 3 Art and Design states:

Critical understanding

- a. Exploring visual, tactile and other sensory qualities of their own and others’ work.
- b. Engaging with ideas, images and artefacts, and identifying how values and meanings are conveyed.
- c. Developing their own views and expressing reasoned judgements.
- d. Analysing and reflecting on work from diverse contexts.

The term is also used on assessment grids for GCSE and GCE (General Certificate of Education) on the various exam boards including Edexcel, AQA and OCR. The Edexcel GCSE assessment grid asks students to: 'Present a personal, informed and meaningful response demonstrating analytical and critical understanding realising intentions and, where appropriate, making connections between visual, written, oral or other elements.' The revision website, BBC Bitesize, aimed to support students through GCSE exams and coursework states: 'Critical understanding is about reflecting on your own work and that of other artists, designers and craftspeople. You need to be able to look closely at how artists and designers communicate their ideas, feelings and beliefs through their work. Your knowledge of the work of others should help you to develop your thinking, and this influence should be apparent in your own work.'

== Critical understanding and the Internet ==
The ability to think critically is an important skill when approaching the question of research and particularly the use of the Internet as a research tool in schools. Learning to use the Internet safely and successfully is considered by some to be a vital element of education in contemporary society.

While the Internet has great learning possibilities it requires a critical approach. Kony 2012 and the subsequent online response is an example of an Internet phenomenon requiring critical understanding. In order to develop an independent and informed response a critical approach is required through which the issues, ideas and opinions presented can be questioned, analysed and reflected upon.

== See also ==
- Pedagogy
