= Advanced Extension Award =

School qualification in England, Wales and Northern Ireland

The Advanced Extension Awards are a type of school-leaving qualification in England, Wales and Northern Ireland, usually taken in the final year of schooling (age 17/18), and designed to allow students to "demonstrate their knowledge, understanding and skills to the full". Currently, it is only available for Mathematics and offered by the exam board Edexcel.

They were introduced in 2002, in response to the UK Government's Excellence in Cities report, as a successor to the S-level examination, and aimed at the top 10% of students in A level tests. They are assessed entirely by external examinations.

Due to introduction of the A* grade for A level courses starting September 2008 (first certification 2010), they have since been phased out, with the exception of the Advanced Extension Award in Mathematics which continues to be available to students.

== Results ==
According to EducationGuardian.co.uk, in 2004, 50.4% of the 7246 entrants failed to achieve a grade at all (fail), indicating that the awards are fulfilling their role in separating the elite. Only 18.3% of students attained the top of the two grades available, the Distinction, with the next 31.3% of students receiving the grade of Merit. Given that only the top students in the country sat these examinations, these results indicate that the AEAs were successful in rewarding only the 50-100 students that were most able in a particular subject.

It was possible to obtain an AEA distinction in more than one subject; however, given the rarity of AEA distinctions, this was uncommon.

== Available subjects ==
Due to the small numbers of candidates for each subject, the exam boards divided the subjects offered amongst themselves, so that – unlike A-levels – each AEA was only offered by one board.

- Biology (including Human Biology) (AQA)
- Business (OCR)
- Chemistry (AQA)
- Critical Thinking (OCR)
- Economics (AQA)
- English (OCR)
- French (OCR)
- Geography (WJEC)
- German (CCEA)
- History (Edexcel)
- Irish (CCEA)
- Latin (OCR)
- Mathematics (Edexcel)
- Physics (CCEA)
- Psychology (AQA)
- Religious Studies (Edexcel)
- Spanish (Edexcel)
- Welsh (WJEC)
- Welsh as a second language (WJEC)

== Partial withdrawal ==
The last AEA examinations across the full range of subjects took place in June 2009, with results issued in August 2009. The Advanced Extension Award was then withdrawn for all subjects except mathematics. This came after the Joint Council for Qualifications (JCQ) decided that the new A* grade being offered at A level would overlap with the purpose of the AEA, rendering them unnecessary. However, the AEA in mathematics was extended until June 2012, as confirmed by Edexcel and the QCA. This was because it met a "definite need", since the A* grade was still not viewed as being challenging enough. In June 2011 Edexcel announced that the AEA was being extended further for mathematics, until June 2015, which was later extended until 2018.

In 2018, Edexcel introduced a new specification, meaning the Advanced Extension Award in mathematics would continue to be available to students in 2019 and beyond, as a qualification aimed at the top 10% of students at A level. All other subjects remain withdrawn, though opportunity exists for examination boards to offer AEAs in other subjects should they choose to in the future, subject to certain expectations.

== Effect of 2020 pandemic ==
In response to the COVID-19 pandemic, in summer 2020 AEA (mathematics) grades were awarded according to assessments made by teachers.

== See also ==
- Sixth Term Examination Paper
