= Critical Thinking Awareness Day =

Observance promoting critical thinking

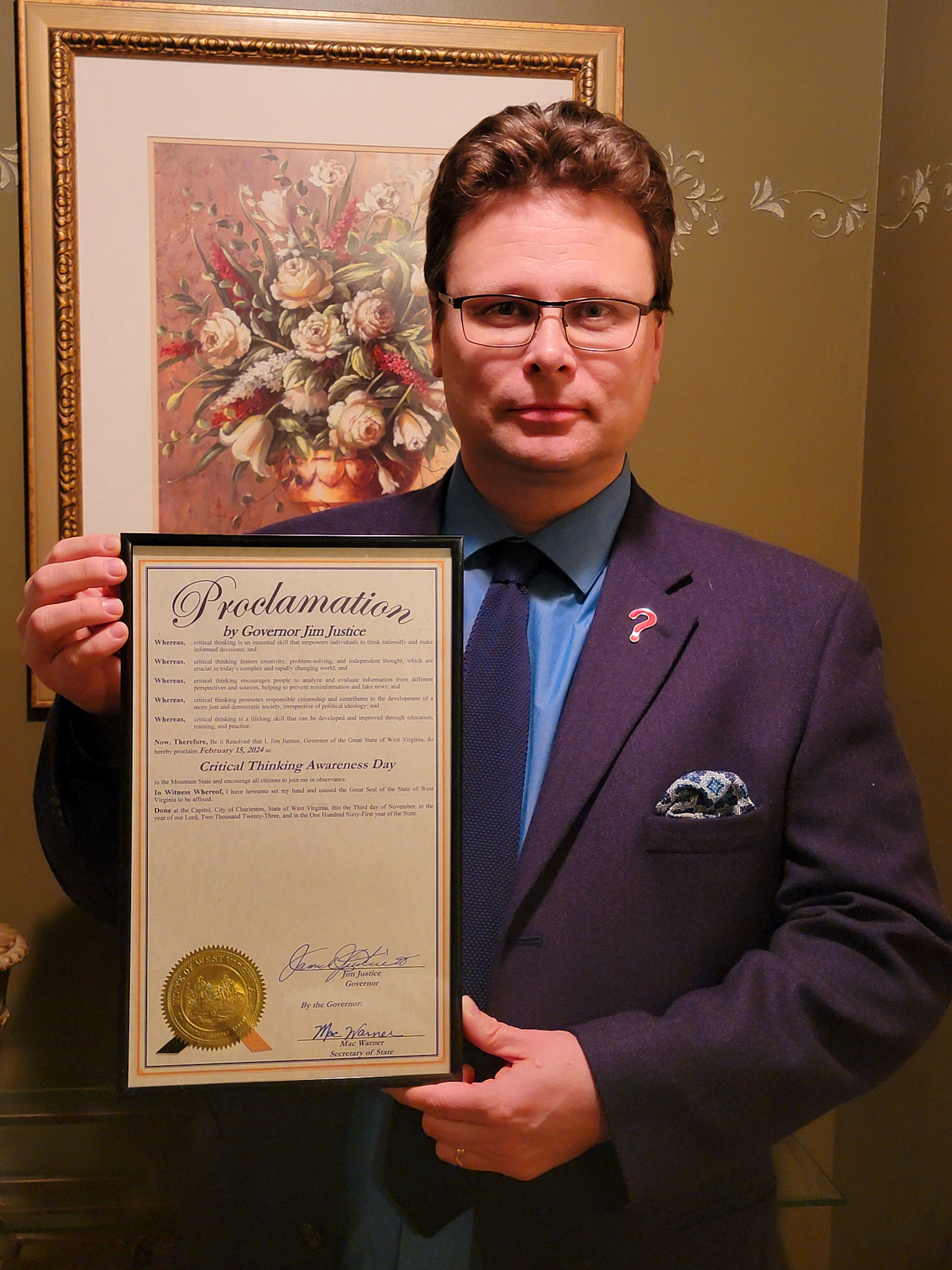
- Original Critical Thinking Day Proclamation
- Status: active
- Genre: Awareness
- Location: West Virginia
- Country: USA
- Inaugurated: February 15, 2024
- Organizer: West Virginia Skeptics Society
- Website: criticalthinkingday.com

Critical Thinking Awareness Day is an annual event to promote rational and critical thinking by the public. Based on a petition from the West Virginia Skeptics Society, Governor Jim Justice proclaimed the first Critical Thinking Awareness day on February 15, 2024.

The proclamation states "critical thinking is an essential skill empowering people to think rationally and make informed decisions, and it fosters creativity, problem solving and independent thought; critical thinking also encourages people to analyze and evaluate information from different perspectives and sources, helping to prevent misinformation, promoting responsible citizenship and contributing to the development of a more just and democratic society. Critical thinking is a lifelong skill that can be developed and improved through education, training and practice."

The date was selected to align closely with the national Classroom Science Days so that school could organize activities that promote both science and critical thinking.

Free activities and resources were organized for schools, from elementary through university and college level, as well as for the public through libraries. Activities included trivia games, debates, and a screening of a documentary that promoted viewing mainstream media through a critical lens.

A group in Utah is working to have Critical Thinking Awareness Day proclaimed in their area. Other states and countries are encouraged to do the same in order to inspire people to reflect on how critical thinking impacts day to day life.

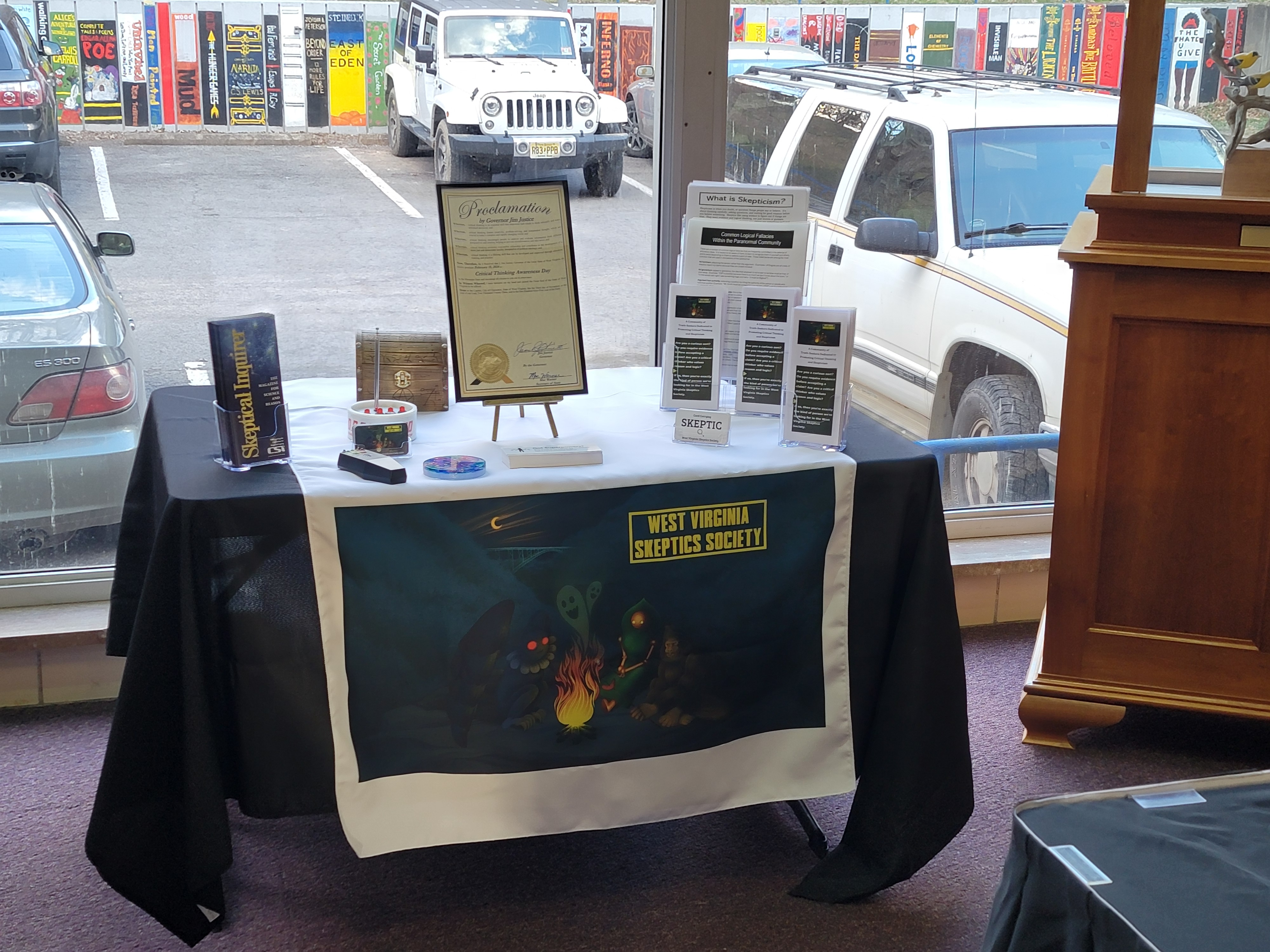
A display of the first Critical Thinking Awareness Day Proclamation

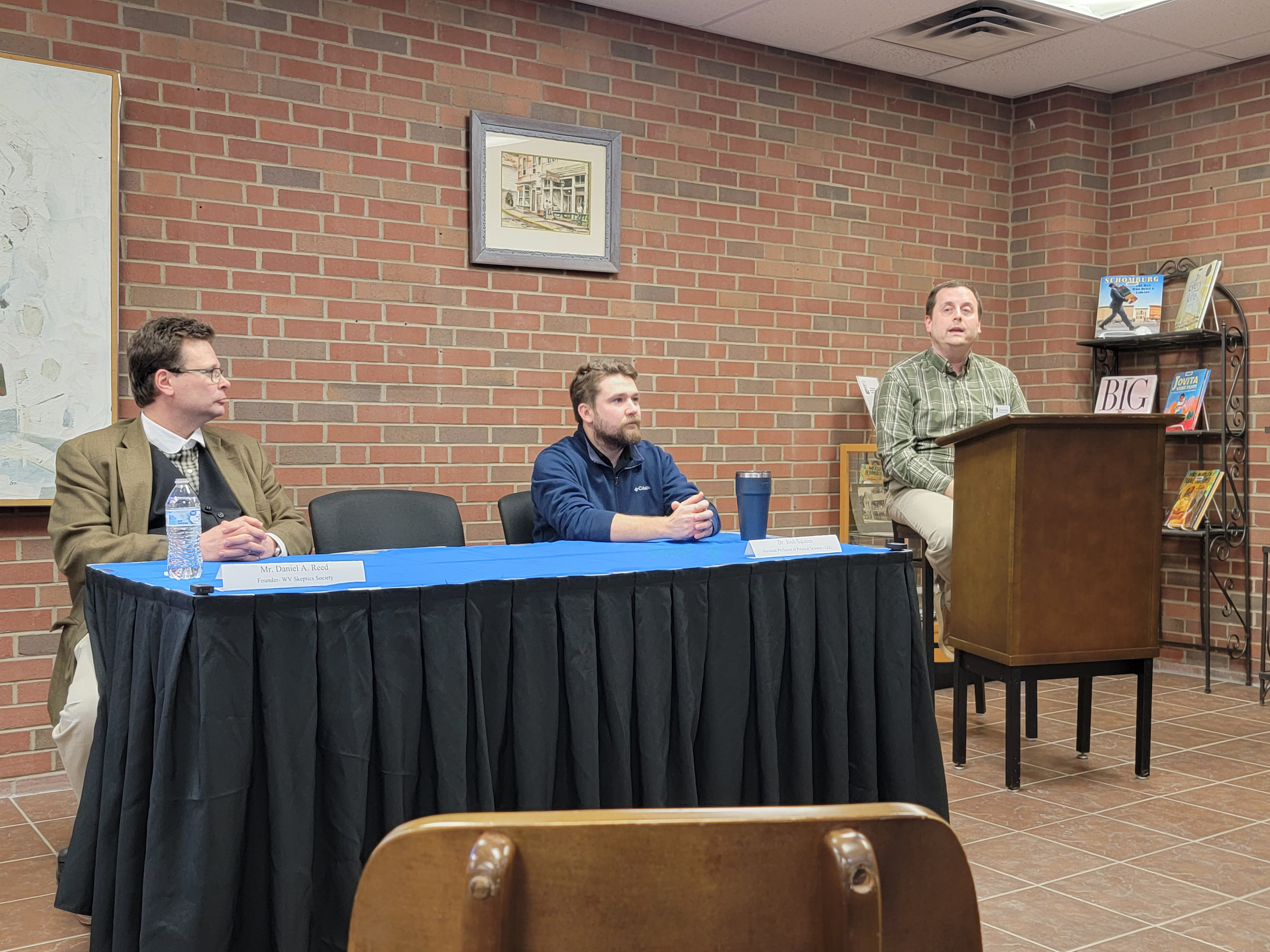
Critical Thinking Awareness Day Discussion Panel

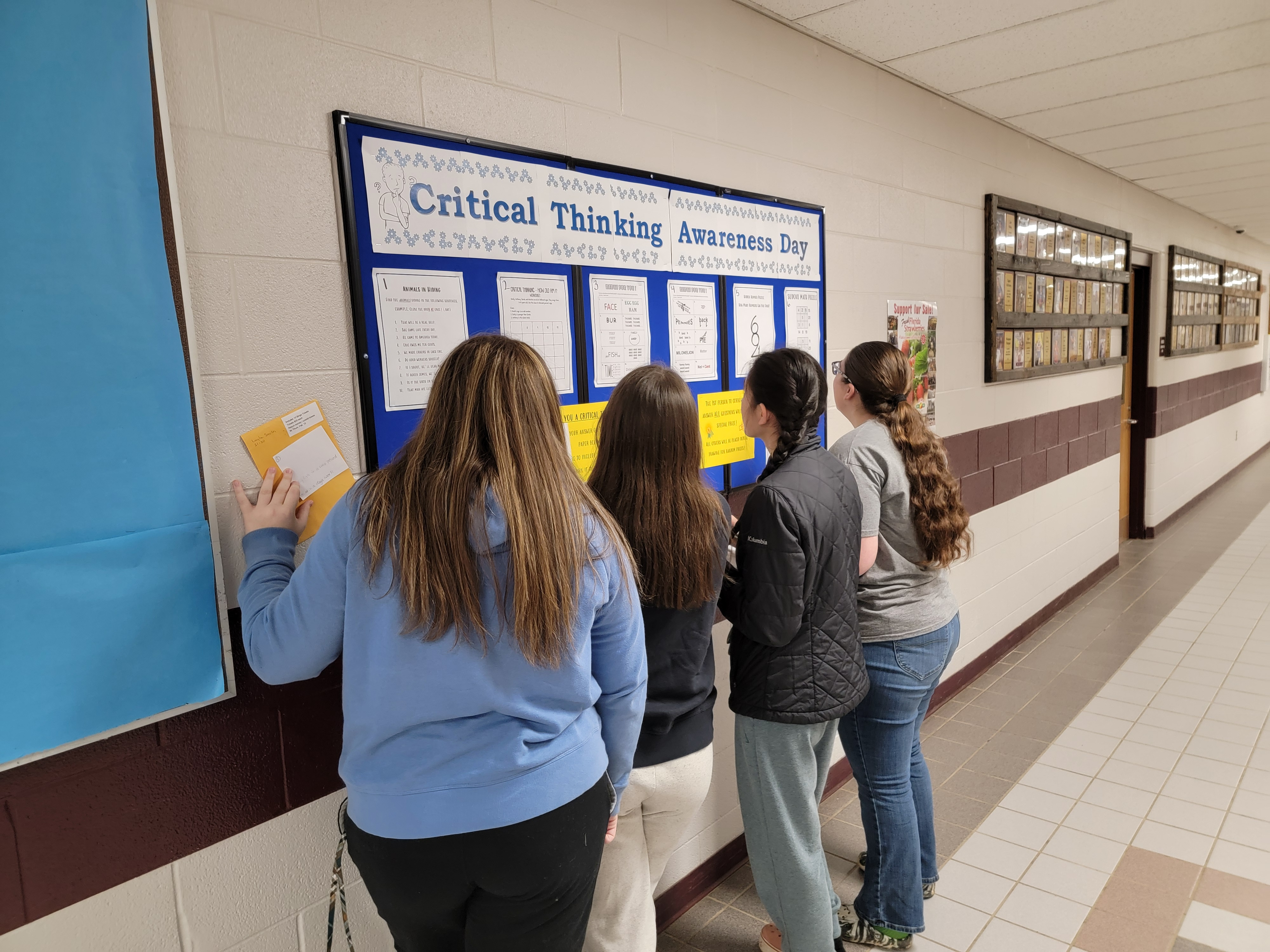
Students engaged in critical thinking activities

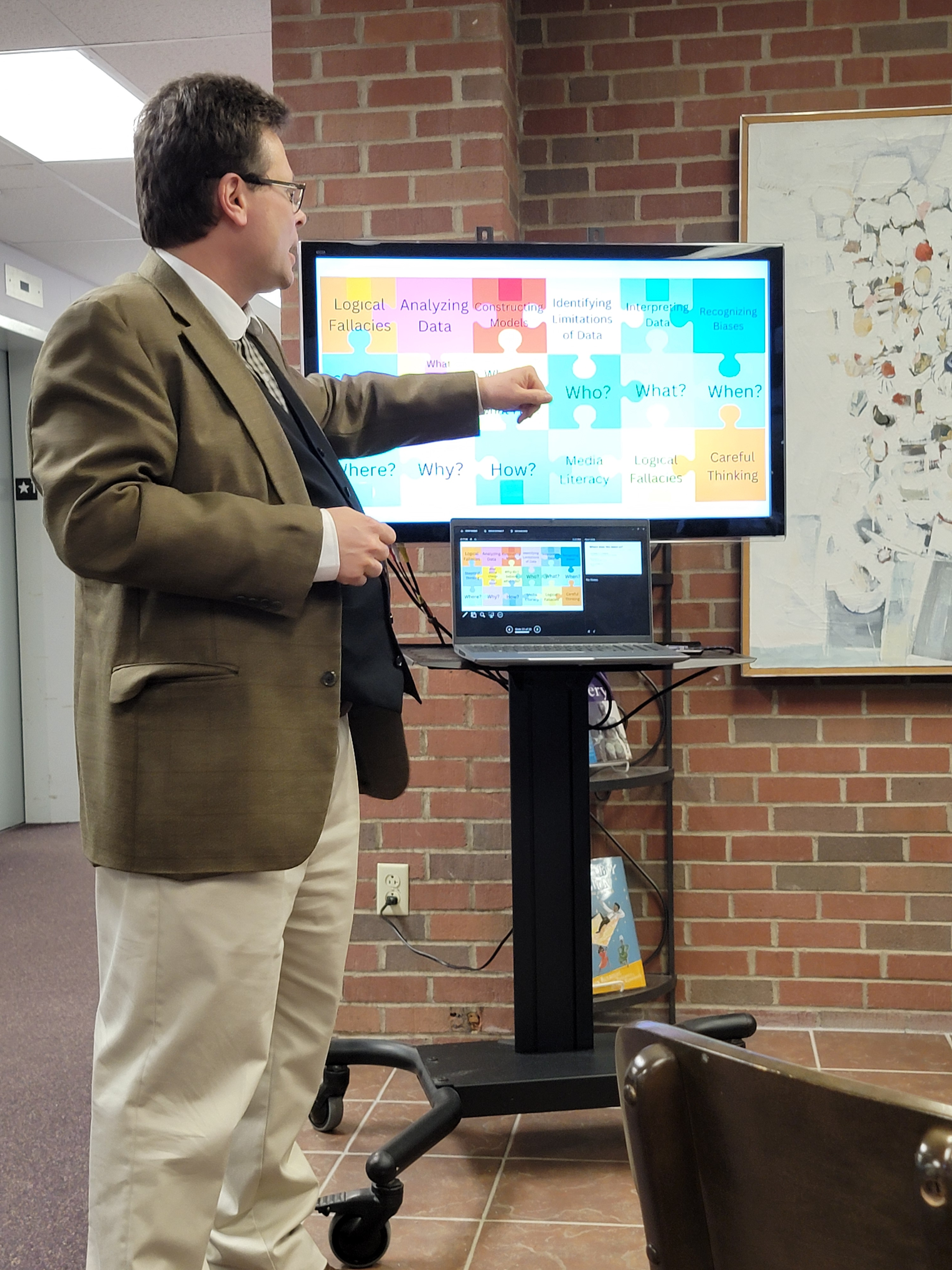
Critical Thinking Presentation
