= State Scholarship (UK) =

UK funding system for university study 1920–1962

A State Scholarship was a financial scholarship award for British university entrants based on scholarship level exam results. Although the award was based on exam performance, the amount received was means-tested. Most university entrants were funded however by grants from their local county education authority. Whilst State Scholarships from the Central Government were greatly sought after for their prestige value they had the same value as local authority grants. In the 1950s, when the pass mark for A-level examinations and the more demanding S-level examinations was 40%. In the late 1950s a State required multiple Distinctions at both A and S Level to be likely to secure a place in the top 400 in the country for that year to secure a State Scholarship. Candidates expected to reach this level were frequently entered for Oxford and Cambridge Scholarships, with a very good chance of success.

== History ==
Founded in 1920, they were replaced after the 1962 awards by student grants.
