= National Admissions Test for Law =

Admissions aptitude test adopted in 2004

- Acronym: LNAT
- Type: Standardised admissions aptitude test
- Administrator: LNAT Consortium Ltd
- Skills tested: Reading comprehension, verbal reasoning and essay writing
- Purpose: Admission to undergraduate law programmes
- Year started: 3 November 2004
- Duration: 135 minutes
- Score range: 0–42 for the multiple-choice section; essay assessed separately
- Offered: Annually
- Regions: Worldwide
- Languages: English
- Prerequisites: None
- Used by: Participating universities
- Website: lnat.ac.uk

The National Admissions Test for Law, or LNAT, is an admissions aptitude test that was adopted in 2004 by eight UK university law programmes as an admissions requirement for home applicants. The test was established at the leading urgency of the University of Oxford as an answer to the problem facing universities trying to select from an increasingly competitive pool with similarly high A-levels. With effect from its second year, the LNAT is required for UK and overseas applicants alike. There are now nine participating law schools and hundreds of test centres worldwide.

It is used alongside standard methods of selection such as A Level (or their global equivalent) results, university applications, and admissions interviews, to give a more accurate and rounded impression of the student's abilities. The LNAT now has over 500 test centres worldwide and twelve participating law schools.

== Format ==
The LNAT is 135 minutes long and consists of two sections. The test taker is allotted 40 minutes to complete the essay and 95 minutes to answer 42 multiple-choice questions aimed at measuring reading comprehension and logical reasoning skills. The reading portion contains twelve short passages, with three or four questions about each passage. The questions typically ask for terms and arguments from the reading to be defined by inference. The essay portion is 40 minutes long and involves the candidate answering one of three available essay questions, which are generally open-ended prompts that can focus on any one of a wide variety of issues. The reading section is scored out of 42 and the essays are individually marked by proctors at the respective universities.

== Universities ==
The universities currently using the LNAT in their admissions procedures are:

- Durham University
- IE University, Spain
- King's College London
- London School of Economics
- O.P. Jindal Global University, India
- Singapore University of Social Sciences, Singapore
- University of Oxford
- SOAS, University of London
- University College London
- University of Bristol
- University of Cambridge
- University of Glasgow

== Results ==
The LNAT was first administered on 3 November 2004. The average score for the reading portion was 13.16 out of 24. Four test-takers received a 21 out of 24, the highest score achieved; the lowest score achieved by the 4,345 candidates was 3. Men performed slightly better than women on the multiple-choice portion, scoring 13.37 and 13.02 on average, respectively. A University of Bristol report on the scores expressed dissatisfaction with the ability of law candidates to develop "reasoned arguments". Men and women scored approximately equally to each other, in contrast to the distribution of A grades in A-level law, which were awarded to 19.3% of women and only 14.1% of men.

The LNAT consortium also reported statistically insignificant differences in scores between state and independent students. Research conducted by the University of Bristol concluded: "the impact of the LNAT both in general and on specific supposedly sensitive widening participation groups has been negligible".

== Average scores ==
Entrants' mean average scores for the multiple choice element of the test in each year are as follows:

Year	Score	Percentage
2006/2007	8/30	26.6
2008/2009	16.7/30	55.6
2010/2011	17.7/42	42.1
2011/2012	18.6/42	44.3
2012/2013	21.3/42	50.7
2013/2014	21.1/42	50.2
2014/2015	22.3/42	53.1
2015/2016	22.9/42	54.5
2016/2017	17.9/42	42.6
2017/2018	19.9/42	47.4
2018/2019	23/42	54.8
2019/2020	21.5/42	51.2
2020/2021	20.8/42	49.5
2021/2022	20/42	47.6
2022/2023	22/42	52.4
2023/2024	23/42	54.8
2024/2025	21/42	50.0
2025/2026	21.8/42	51.9
