= Kerry S. Walters =

American philosopher (born 1954)

Kerry S. Walters (born 1954) is Professor emeritus of Philosophy at Gettysburg College and author of numerous books on philosophy, religion, and American history as well as over 200 articles in academic journals, trade magazines, and newspapers. His special fields of interests include Christian mysticism, atheism, the ethics of diet, Christian pacifism, critical thinking, deism in early America, and the history of the early republic.

== Career ==
Walters earned his BA (Philosophy, 1976) at the University of North Carolina at Charlotte, his MA (Philosophy, 1980) at Marquette University, and his PhD (Philosophy, 1985) at the University of Cincinnati. He taught at Gettysburg College for three decades, retiring in May 2016. He also taught at Xavier University, the University of Cincinnati, and the University of Essex in England.

During his tenure at Gettysburg College, Walters held the Edwin T. and Cynthia Johnson Chair of Distinguished Teaching and the William Bittinger Chair of Philosophy. He also helped found and taught in the program of Peace and Justice Studies.

== Notable works ==
Several of Walters' books have received national awards or recognition. Merciful Meekiness: Becoming a Spiritually Integrated Person, was named a "Best Book on Spirituality for 2005" by Spirituality and Health Magazine; his Revolutionary Deists: Early America's Rational Infidels was named a "Choice Outstanding Academic Title" for 2011; his The Art of Dying and Living received a Gold Nautilus Award for 2012; his Giving up God ... to Find God: Breaking Free of Idolatry won a 2014 National Catholic Press Award; his "St. Teresa of Calcutta" a 2016 National Catholic Press Award; and his "Oscar Romero: Priest, Prophet, Martyr" won a 2019 National Catholic Press Award.

== Translated works ==
His work has been translated in Korean and Portuguese.

=== Korean ===
- Re-Thinking Reason published in 1994(korean title:창의적 비판적사고)
- The Art of Dying and Living(korean title: 아름답게 사는 기술)

=== Portuguese ===
- Ateísmo Um Guia Para Crentes e não Crentes - Coleção Philosophia (Atheism: A Guide for the Perplexed in Brazilian Portuguese)
