= Scholarship level =

Type of UK national school examination award

- Acronym: S-level
- Skills tested: Varies depending on subject
- Score range: 1, 2 or U
- Regions: England, Wales and Northern Ireland
- Languages: English language

The S-level or scholarship level was a General Certificate of Education (GCE) public examination in England, Wales and Northern Ireland, taken by the most able A-level students. The 'S' level was typically used to support university entrance applications, though in practice it was directed almost exclusively to Oxbridge applications. Results were graded 'Distinction' (1), 'Merit' (2) or 'Unclassified' (U).

== History ==
The rationale behind 'S' levels was to permit the Ministry of Education to allocate 400 state scholarships for the best performance of all those examined at 'A' and 'S' levels in a specific year. A state scholarship would be awarded on the basis of these results. Likewise, local authorities also considered 'S' level results when awarding county scholarships. As a result, it was customary for sixth form students to offer 'S' levels when applying to universities.

Until 1962 (at the earliest), the actual mark was provided to candidates. The 'S' level Higher Mathematics papers, for example, were not marked unless at least 75 (Distinction) was secured in the 'A' level pure mathematics and/or applied mathematics papers. The marks were normalised, but usually completion of 2 or 3 questions of 10 on the paper offered was sufficient to secure a distinction. The highest possible score was 90 for 10 excellent answers, due to normalisation.

Although 'S' levels were marked and graded in isolation from 'A' levels, it was not commonly a standalone qualification and was usually attempted only by candidates who were also sitting an 'A' level in the same subject and who were likely to obtain an "A" grade (the top grade) in that examination. The subject matter of 'S' levels was identical to the 'A' level syllabus, but the questions considerably harder. 'S' levels principally aimed to test candidates confronted with unfamiliar situations and show their reasoning.

State Scholarships were abolished in 1962 and the exams were renamed Special papers. After 1963, the Ministry of Education, following advice from the Secondary School Examinations Council, decided only 2 'S' levels could be offered by a candidate at any one time and results given as gradings. Special papers were last set in 2001 and then superseded by the Advanced Extension Awards and to some extent by Sixth Term Examination Papers.
