= Georg Wöhrle =

Georg Wöhrle (born 11 March 1953 in Würzburg) is a German Classical philologist and medical historian.

== Life ==
Wöhrle studied classical philology from 1974 to 1983 at the University of Freiburg under Wolfgang Kullmann, Karl Büchner, Eckard Lefèvre and Hermann Strasburger. In 1983 he received his doctorate in Greek from Wolfgang Kullmann for his thesis on "Theophrasts Methode in seinen botanischen Schriften" (Theophrastus' Methods in his Botanical Writings). In 1988 he achieved his habilitation from the University of Bamberg with his work, "Studien zur Theorie der antiken Gesundheitslehre" (Studies on the Theory of Ancient Medical Education). Subsequently, he was the Heisenberg fellow of the Deutsche Forschungsgemeinschaft and held teaching chairs at the University of Würzburg and the University of Mainz.

In 1994 he took up the position of ordinary professor of classical philology at the University of Trier, with a special focus on Greek. From 2002-2004, he was vice-president for research, teaching and external affairs at Trier.

Wöhrle is a liaison lecturer of the Friedrich Naumann Foundation, a committee member of the scholarship foundation of Rheinland-Pfalz and a contributor to the Frankfurter Allgemeine Zeitung.

== Research focus ==
Wöhrle focuses on archaic Greek literature, pre-socratic philosophy, gender studies and especially the history of medicine and natural science in antiquity. He is an editor of the series Antike Naturwissenschaft und ihre Rezeption (AKAN) along with Jochen Althoff and Bernhard Herzhoff.Together with Barbara Feichtinger, Therese Fuhrer, and Christine Walde, he is also a co-editor of the series iphis – Gender Studies in den Altertumswissenschaften.

As part of an international collaborative research project, he is currently engaged in the preparation of a new edition of the Greek, Latin, and Arabic testimonia concerning the pre-socratic philosophers. A central focus of this edition is the systematic consideration of the transmission contexts in which the testimonia have been preserved. To date, five volumes have appeared in the series Traditio Praesocratica (De Gruyter): on Thales, Anaximander and Anaximenes of Miletus; on Xenophanes (co-edited with Benedikt Strobel); and, in collaboration with Theofanis Tsiampokalos, on Alcmaeon; on Hippon and Menestor, as well as on Archelaus. Closely associated with this project is the series Studia Praesocratica, which Wöhrle also co-edits.
