= Uniform Mark Scheme =

Exam grade standardisation method

A Uniform Mark Scale, or UMS, is a way of standardising the marking of papers across different examination boards, allowing someone to compare two marks marked by two different examination boards. Grades are then calculated using grade boundaries set at particular UMS scores.

== A Levels ==
Until 2008, all A Levels in the United Kingdom were based on a 600 UMS or 400 UMS points system, including 300 Points attained from the Advanced Subsidiary (AS) Level.

A Level module exams and courseworks are worth a set number of UMS marks. These modules and courseworks for a specific A Level combine to give a total UMS mark. For example, an A level Chemistry course might consist of 4 exams worth 90 UMS and 2 exams worth 120 UMS, totalling a maximum of 600 UMS.

From 2008 onward, many subjects moved from 600 to 400 UMS for the A-level, and from 300 to 200 UMS for the AS. There are also subjects, such as Japanese and Chinese, with 200 UMS available for the A-level and 100 for the AS. Some A-levels (e.g. Mathematics and single sciences) retain the 600 UMS mark system.

Raw marks awarded in an exam are converted to UMS marks according to the difficulty of the exam paper and the performance of candidates. For example, one year a candidate may only need 62 raw marks to get an A grade (80%), but another year 62 marks may only be equivalent to a B grade (70%). This means that it is possible for candidates to achieve full UMS marks in an exam, even if they didn't receive full marks in the actual exam.

An A* grade was added in 2008 as a replacement of the advanced extension awards (AEA). The A* grade is only obtainable in the A2 level. For all subjects this requires a student to obtain 80% of all the UMS available in addition to 90% of the UMS available in the A2 modules. However, this is different in A level maths: to obtain an A* in A level maths one must obtain 80% of the available UMS in the whole A level and at least 90% (180 UMS marks) across the two required A2 modules C3 and C4. These criteria are applicable to all exam boards like AQA, Edexcel, OCR and WJEC etc.

=== A level UMS boundaries ===
- A* at A level requires 80% of available UMS + 90% of available UMS in A2 Modules
- A at A level requires 80% of available UMS
- B at A level requires 70% of available UMS
- C at A level requires 60% of available UMS
- D at A level requires 50% of available UMS
- E at A level requires 40% of available UMS
- U at A level if less than 40% of available UMS
