= Wavell =

Wavell may refer to:

== People ==
- Archibald Wavell, 1st Earl Wavell (1883–1950), British field marshal
- Archibald Wavell, 2nd Earl Wavell (1916–1953), British soldier
- Stewart Wavell (1921–2010), British-Malaysian writer

== Places ==
- Wavell Heights, Queensland, Australia

== Buildings ==
- The Wavell School, Farnborough, England
- Wavell State High School, Wavell Heights, Queensland, Australia
