= Entry Level =

British educational qualification

Entry Level is the lowest level in the National Qualifications Framework in England, Wales, and Northern Ireland. Qualifications at this level recognise basic knowledge and skills and the ability to apply learning in everyday situations under direct guidance or supervision. Learning at this level involves building basic knowledge and skills and is not usually geared towards specific occupations.

Entry Level qualifications can be taken at three levels (Entry 1, Entry 2 and Entry 3) and are available on a broad range of subjects. They are targeted at a range of learners, including adult learners, candidates on taster sessions, underachievers and ones with learning difficulties.

The level after Entry Level in the National Qualifications Framework is Level 1, which includes GCSE grades D-G (or 3-1 for reformed GCSEs) and Level 1 DiDA.

== Examples of Entry Level qualifications ==
- Entry Level Certificate
- Entry Level Functional Skills

== See also ==
- National Qualifications Framework
