= OCR Nationals =

British educational qualification

OCR Nationals are vocationally related qualifications which were officially launched by the OCR Board in September 2004. The qualifications are designed to meet the needs of those seeking vocational education in place of the traditional, theory-intensive, academic route. Although the target audience are teenagers (14-19), the qualifications are also suitable for adult learners, much like the GNVQ. The OCR Nationals are being phased out, and replaced by the Cambridge Nationals.

== New alternative ==
OCR Nationals are available at Levels 1, 2 and 3.

They are available in the following subject areas:

- Business
- Design
- Health & Social care
- Information Technology
- Leisure/Travel & Tourism
- Media
- Public Services
- Science
- Sport

== ICT ==
=== OCR National ICT Level 2 ===
The OCR Level 2 Nationals in ICT have been developed to recognise learners' skills, knowledge and understanding of Information and Communication Technology functions, environments and operations.

The learners carry out a range of tasks that have been designed to recognise their achievements in a modern, practical way that is relevant to the workplace.

They do not certificate competence on the job but are work-related qualifications which will support progression to an NVQ once a candidate is in the workplace. Specification aims

These qualifications specifically aim to:

- Develop learner's knowledge and understanding of the Information and Communication Technology sector
- Develop learner's skills, knowledge and understanding in contexts that are directly relevant to employment situations, thereby enhancing their employability within the Information and Communication Technology sector
- Develop learner's ability to work autonomously and effectively in an Information and Communication Technology context
- Enable learners to develop knowledge and understanding in specialist areas of Information and Communication Technology, and demonstrate the skills needed to participate in the operation and development of ICT specific or ICT non-specific business organisations
- Encourage progression by assisting in the development of skills, knowledge and understanding that learners will need to access further or higher education programmes or occupational training on a full-time or part-time basis
- Encourage progression by assisting in the development of skills, knowledge and understanding that learners will need to enter employment or enhance their current employment status
- Promote interaction between employers, centres and learners by relating teaching and assessment to real organisations.

All units are centre-assessed and externally moderated by OCR. There are no timetabled exams for this qualification; candidates may complete units at a time that suits the centre. The full award and units from this qualification are graded as Pass, Merit or Distinction.

The units are split into three sections A, B and C.

A=1 B=2-18 C=19-23

Equivalently
	1 GCSE	2 GCSEs	3 GCSEs	4 GCSEs
As	1	1	1	1
Bs	1	2	5	6
Cs	1	2	2	5

There are other ways to do it for example 2 fewer units from the C and one extra from B.

=== List of Unit Titles ===
==== Mandatory ====
- Unit 1 ICT skills for business

==== Optional ====
- Unit 2 Webpage creation
- Unit 3 Digital imaging - plan and produce computer graphics
- Unit 4 Design and produce multimedia products
- Unit 5 Desktop publishing
- Unit 6 Spreadsheets - design and use
- Unit 7 Databases - design and use
- Unit 8 Technological innovation and e-commerce
- Unit 9 Customer support
- Unit 10 Planning and supporting telecommunications
- Unit 11 Career planning for IT
- Unit 12 Work experience in IT
- Unit 13 IT systems and user needs
- Unit 14 Installation of applications
- Unit 15 System testing and maintenance
- Unit 16 Repair and decommission of IT equipment
- Unit 17 CAD and CAM
- Unit 18 Application of computer control
- Unit 19 Application of data logging
- Unit 20 Creating animation for the WWW using ICT
- Unit 21 Creating computer graphics
- Unit 22 Creating sound using ICT
- Unit 23 Creating video

Source: OCR

Qualifications

Qualification	Number of units required	Equivalent GCSEs
National First Award	1 Mandatory, 2 optional	1 GCSE (Equiv A* - C)
National Award	1 Mandatory, 4 optional	2 GCSEs (Equiv A* - C)
Nationals First Certificate	1 Mandatory, 6 optional	3 GCSEs (Equiv A* - C)
Nationals Certificate	1 Mandatory, 8 optional	4 GCSEs (Equiv A* - C)

== See also ==
- BTEC
- Diploma in Digital Applications
