= LACTOR =

LACTOR (London Association of Classical Teachers - Original Records) are a series of sourcebooks published by the LACTOR committee since 1968. The books give translations of primary source material, accompanied by relevant annotations. They are designed so that the reader requires no prior knowledge on the area. The books cover the history of Greece between 478 BC and 323 BC, and the history of Rome between 113 BC and 117 AD. The history of Roman Britain is also covered, between 113 BC and 410 AD. Parts of LACTOR are used in OCR's GCE Advanced Level Ancient History and Classical Civilisation courses.

== Publications ==
Number	Title	ISBN
1	The Athenian Empire	9780903625173
2	The Old Oligarch: Pseudo-Xenophon's Constitution of the Athenians	9780903625319
3	Cicero's Consulship Campaign	9780903625333
3	A Short Guide to Electioneering: Quintus Cicero's Commentariolum Petitionis	9780903625227
4	Inscriptions of Roman Britain	9780903625326
5	Athenian Radical Democracy, 461-404 BC	9780903625272
6	Sallust: Fragments Of The Histories And Pseudo-Sallust: Letters To Caesar	
7	Roman Politics, 80-44 BC	9780903625098
8	Inscriptions of the Roman Empire, AD 14-117	9780903625241
9	Greek Historical Inscriptions, 359-323 BC	9780903625111
10	Cicero’s Cilician Letters	9780903625258
11	Literary Sources for Roman Britain	9780903625265
12	The Culture of Athens	9780903625159
13	From the Gracchi to Sulla	9780903625166
14	Plutarch: Cato the Younger	9780903625180
15	Dio: The Julio-Claudians. Selections from Books 58-63 of the Roman History of Cassius Dio	9780903625210
16	The Persian Empire from Cyrus II to Artaxerxes I	9780903625289
17	The Age of Augustus	9780903625302
18	The High Tide of Empire: Emperors and Empire AD 14-117	9780903625296
19	Tiberius to Nero	9780903625340
21	Sparta	9780903625401
20	The Flavians	9780903625388
