= Christmas Eve Battle =

- Part of Mau Mau Uprising
- Christmas Eve Battle (Kenya)
Date	24 December 1953
Location	Thika, Kenya
Result	Mau Mau victory

Belligerents
British Empire: Kenya	Mau Mau

Commanders and leaders
(British Empire) Maj. Earl Wavell †	Dedan Kimathi

Units involved
British Army: Black Watch; Kenyan Police	Unknown

Strength
Unknown	60 insurgents

Casualties and losses
2 Europeans killed 1 African police killed 6 wounded Total: 9	5 killed 4 captured Total: 9 insurgents

The Christmas Eve Battle took place during the Mau Mau Uprising on the 24 December 1953 between British Empire and rebel Mau Mau forces and resulted in the death of Earl Wavell, the only son of Archibald Wavell.

It took place around 25 miles north of Nairobi. Wavell was leading a patrol of British troops and African police pursuing from Mau Mau who had beheaded a loyal Kikuyu tribesman in the Thaika area. They tracked down about 20 of the Mau Mau who opened fire, killing Wavell immediately. The battle went for ten hours.

Wavell had lost his left hand in Burma during World War II. He had no heirs so his death meant the end of the Wavell line.
