= Midland Examining Group =

Former exam board in England, Wales and Northern Ireland

- Abbreviation: MEG
- Merged into: OCR
- Formation: 1985
- Dissolved: 1998
- Purpose: Examination board
- Headquarters: Cambridge, UK
- Region served: England, Wales and Northern Ireland
- Parent organization: UCLES (1993–1998)

The Midland Examining Group (MEG) was an examination board, operating in England, Wales and Northern Ireland. It offered a range of GCSE and Certificate of Achievement qualifications. It became part of OCR in 1998.

== History ==
The board was one of a number of new 'examining groups' formed to develop syllabuses for the GCSE qualification, which was due to replace the GCE O Level and CSE qualifications in 1988. MEG was formed by the University of Cambridge Local Examinations Syndicate, the Oxford and Cambridge Schools Examination Board and Southern Universities' Joint Board for School Examinations GCE boards and the East Midlands Regional Examinations Board and The West Midlands Examinations Board CSE boards in 1985. Though this was not a merger and the boards remained independent of each other, the East Midlands and West Midlands boards, who stopped offering CSEs after they were phased out in 1987, now only offered exams as part of MEG, although they continued their other services such as in-service training, OFSTED inspections, and prison service education. The operation and processing of the GCSE was shared out between the constituent boards with the Oxford, Cambridge, Bristol, Nottingham and Birmingham centres each taking responsibility for a number of the subjects offered. The University of Cambridge Local Examinations Syndicate, Oxford and Cambridge Schools Examination Board and Southern Universities' Joint Board each continued to offer A Levels independently.

Despite its regional name, schools were free to pick which exam board to use for their qualifications and MEG eventually set 30% of all GCSE qualifications taken each year. The board also wrote syllabuses for the Certificate of Achievement (later becoming the Entry Level Certificate), aimed at students working below GCSE level.

In 1993, MEG became part of the University of Cambridge Local Examinations Syndicate (UCLES), though it retained its separate identity. Around this time, UCLES also took over the East Midland Regional Examination Board. UCLES's A Level division, the Oxford and Cambridge Examinations and Assessment Council (OCEAC), took over both the Southern Universities' Joint Board and later, in 1995, the Oxford and Cambridge Board. The Midland Examining Group (MEG) headquarters offices were then in Cambridge at the UCLES offices in Hills Road, although some MEG subject officers and part of the exam processing were still based in Birmingham in the TWMEB offices at Mill Wharf.

Following the government decision to establish "unitary" exam boards, UCLES announced in 1997 that it was, with the Royal Society of Arts Examinations Board, launching the Oxford, Cambridge and RSA Examinations (OCR) exam board, which would take over running all UCLES (including MEG and OCEAC) and RSA qualifications in the United Kingdom from October 1, 1998, though it continued to use the old syllabuses until they expired. The West Midlands Examinations Board became part of OCR. The MEG name appeared on some, but not all, of the Summer 1999 exam papers, but the certificates for that year, and all subsequent exam papers, featured the OCR name only.
