= Cambridge Nationals =

British educational qualification

Cambridge Nationals are a vocational qualification in the United Kingdom introduced by the OCR Examinations Board to replace the OCR Nationals. These are Level 1 and Level 2 qualifications for students aged 14 to 16 and are usually awarded after a two-year course. Students can progress to A Levels, apprenticeships or other Level 3 vocational qualifications within the national qualifications frameworks in the United Kingdom.

OCR is part of Cambridge University Press & Assessment.

== Subjects ==
=== Former ===
In 2014 the UK government announced that it would reform all vocational qualifications. During the COVID-19 pandemic, OCR announced a series of adjustments it would make to support learners taking Cambridge Nationals. The following subjects were offered up to 2022:

- Child Development Certificate Level 1/2
- Creative iMedia Award/Certificate Level 1/2
- Engineering Design Award/Certificate Level 1/2
- Engineering Manufacture Award/Certificate Level 1/2
- Enterprise and Marketing Certificate Level 1/2
- Health and Social Care Award/Certificate Level 1/2
- Information Technologies Certificate Level 1/2
- Principles in Engineering and Engineering Business Award/Certificate Level 1/2
- Sport Science Award/Certificate Level 1/2
- Sport Studies Award/Certificate Level 1/2
- Systems Control in Engineering Award/Certificate Level 1/2

=== Current ===
By 2021, plans for vocational qualifications in England redeveloped from Level 1/Level 2 Cambridge Nationals qualifications were approved by OFQUAL for inclusion on the key stage 4 performance tables in England for 2024. They would be taught from 2022. The ten redeveloped Cambridge Nationals qualifications taught from 2022 are:

- Child Player
- Creative iMedia
- Enterprise and Marketing
- Engineering Design
- Engineering Manufacture
- Engineering Programmable Systems
- Health and Social Care
- IT
- Sport Science
- Sport Studies
