= Entry Level Certificate =

Educational qualification in England, Wales and Northern Ireland

The Entry Level Certificate (ELC) is a qualification offered in England, Wales and Northern Ireland. It lies at Entry Level of the National Qualifications Framework, pitching it just below GCSE level.

== The qualification ==
ELCs are available in a variety of subjects, such as English, Maths, Science, French, Life Skills and Childcare.

The qualifications are targeted at those who struggle to access the mainstream curriculum, such as students with special educational needs. Most students take the qualifications in school at ages 14–16, as an alternative to GCSEs, but many adults also take them.

Students are assessed through a combination of coursework, controlled assessment and examinations, depending on the qualification.

ELCs are offered by a number of examination boards, including AQA, CCEA, Edexcel, OCR and WJEC.

== Grading ==
A student successfully completing an ELC is awarded one of the following grades, which are common to all Entry Level qualifications:

- Entry 3 (highest)
- Entry 2
- Entry 1 (lowest)

Those who do not reach the level for Entry 1 are recorded as uncertified (U) and do not have the subject appear on their results certificates.

Entry 1, Entry 2 and Entry 3 are broadly equivalent to National Curriculum Levels 1, 2 and 3 respectively.

When converting qualifications to school attainment points, Entry 1 is worth 10 points, Entry 2 is worth 12 and Entry 3 is worth 14. This compares to 16 points for GCSE Grade G (the lowest GCSE pass) and 22 points for GCSE Grade F.

== History ==
The Entry Level Certificate was launched as the Certificate of Achievement (Certificate of Educational Achievement if offered by WJEC) in September 1996, with the first awards being made in 1998. The grades were originally known as Distinction (now Entry 3), Merit (Entry 2) and Pass (Entry 1).

The name Entry Level Certificate was adopted from the 2001 award onwards.
