= The Wavell School =

Location
- Lynchford Road; Farnborough, Hampshire, GU14 6BH; England; 51.2723°N 0.7544°W

Information
- Type: Community school
- Motto: We care to challenge
- Established: 23 October 1970
- Founder: Archibald Wavell, 1st Earl Wavell
- Local authority: Hampshire
- Department for Education URN: 116448 Tables
- Ofsted: Reports
- Headteacher: Emma Wright
- Gender: Coeducational
- Age: 11 to 16
- Enrolment: 1,012 as of May 2022
- Website: http://wavellschool.org.uk/

The Wavell School is a coeducational community secondary school, located in Farnborough in the English county of Hampshire.

The school serves the civilian and military communities of North Camp, Farnborough and Aldershot, and is administered by Hampshire County Council which coordinates the schools admissions. It is named after Archibald Wavell, 1st Earl Wavell, a senior commander in the British Army who went on to become Viceroy and Governor-General of India.

The Wavell school was opened on 23 October 1970 led by Lady Pamela Humphrys, daughter of Archibald Wavell. At the beginning of the 21st century, the school gained specialist Technology College status. The school offers GCSEs and Cambridge Nationals as programmes of study for pupils. The Wavell School also operates The Duke of Edinburgh's Award programme.
