= Earl Wavell =

Extinct earldom in the Peerage of the United Kingdom

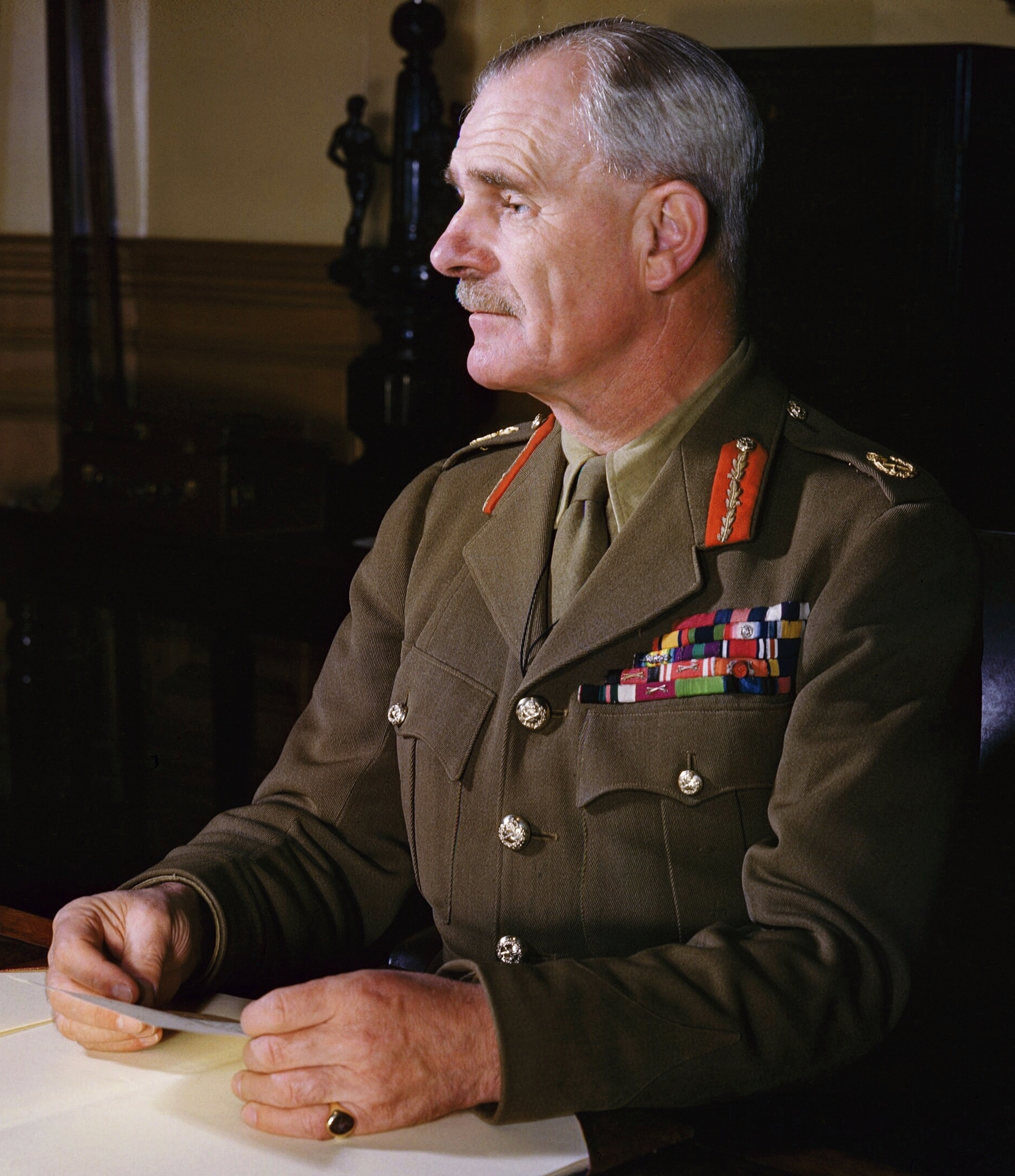
Archibald Wavell, 1st Earl Wavell.

Earl Wavell was a title in the Peerage of the United Kingdom. It was created in 1947 for Field Marshal Archibald Wavell, 1st Viscount Wavell, Viceroy of India from 1943 to 1947. He had already been created Viscount Wavell, of Cyrenaica and of Winchester in the County of Southampton, in 1943, and was made Viscount Keren, of Eritrea and of Winchester in the County of Southampton, at the same time as he was given the earldom. These titles were also in the Peerage of the United Kingdom. The titles became extinct on the early death of his son, the second Earl, in 1953.

The family surname was pronounced "Way-vell".

== Earls Wavell (1947) ==
- Archibald Percival Wavell, 1st Earl Wavell (1883–1950)
- Archibald John Arthur Wavell, 2nd Earl Wavell (1916–1953)

== Arms ==
Coat of arms of Earl Wavell
Coronet A Coronet of an Earl Crest Demi-Lion holding between the paws a Human Heart vulned proper. Escutcheon Azure, a Chevron between three Fleurs-de-lis Or a Bordure Argent charged with six Martlets Gules. Supporters Dexter, a soldier of the Black Watch in field service uniform supporting with his exterior hand a Rifle; sinister, Scholar of Winchester College in his gown holding in his exterior hand a Closed Book, all proper. Motto Pro patria
