= Archibald Wavell, 2nd Earl Wavell =

British Earl (1916–1953)

Major The Right Honourable The Earl Wavell MC
- Born: 11 May 1916
- Died: 24 December 1953 (aged 37); Thaika, Kenya
- Military career
- Allegiance: United Kingdom
- Branch: British Army
- Service years: 1936–1953
- Rank: Major
- Service number: 67159
- Unit: Black Watch
- Conflicts: Arab revolt in Palestine; Second World War: Burma campaign; Operation Thursday; Mau Mau Uprising: Christmas Eve Battle †
- Awards: Military Cross

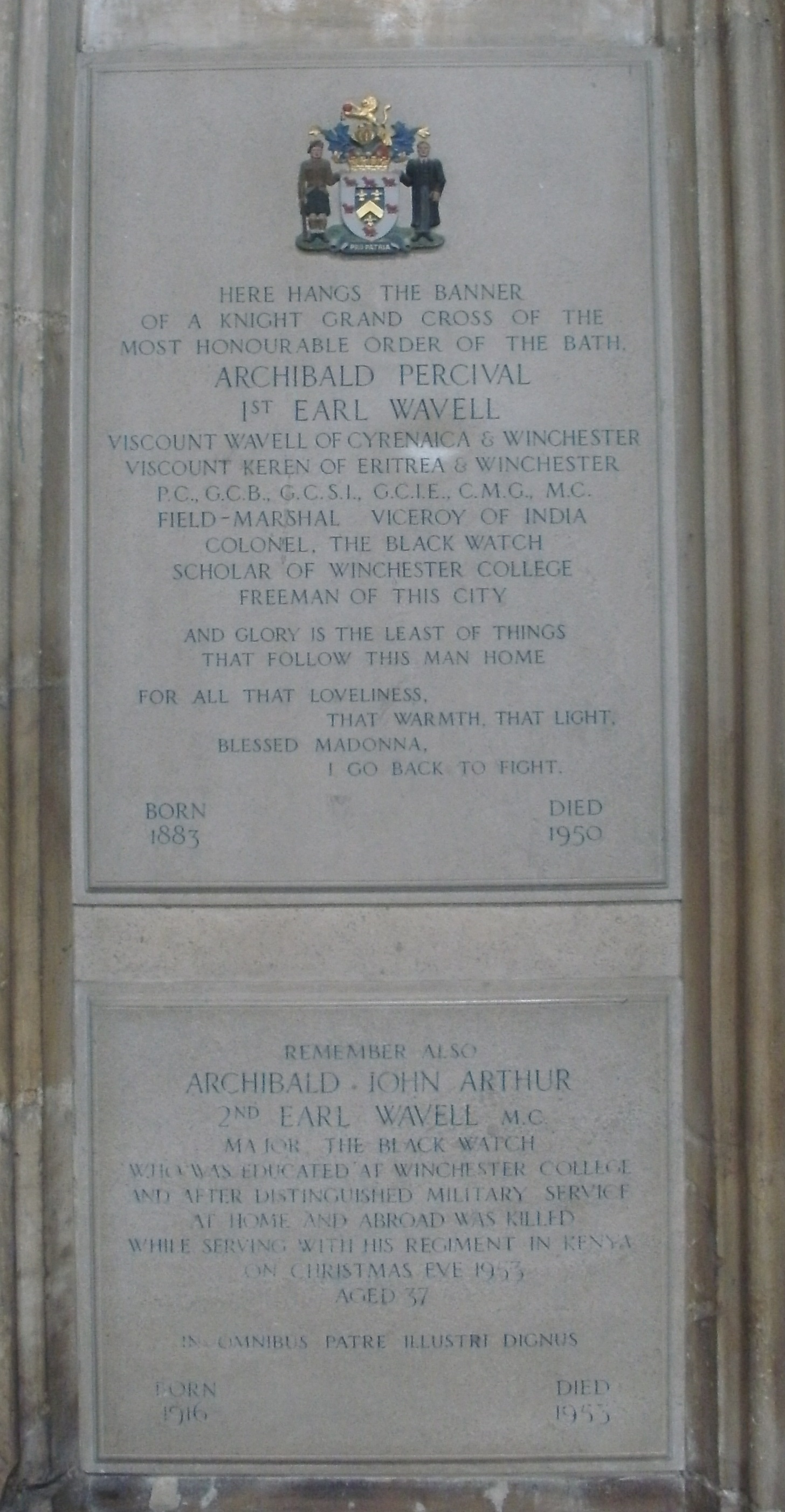
Winchester Cathedral, memorial plaques for the 2nd Earl Wavell (died 1953) and his father, Field Marshal 1st Earl Wavell (died 1950).

Major Archibald John Arthur Wavell, 2nd Earl Wavell, MC (11 May 1916 – 24 December 1953) was a British Army officer and peer. The son of Field Marshal Archibald Wavell, 1st Earl Wavell, he was educated at Winchester College. Wavell succeeded his father in 1950, but was killed three years later in the Mau Mau Uprising, and the titles became extinct on his death.

== Military career ==
Commissioned a second lieutenant in the Black Watch on 30 January 1936, Wavell's first posting was in the British Mandate for Palestine from 1936 to 1939. Promoted to lieutenant on 30 January 1939, he then fought in the Second World War. He lost his left hand fighting the Japanese in Burma in June 1944 in Operation Thursday where he fought with the Chindits. Evacuated to India he served on his father's staff, his father, by now 1st Viscount Wavell, being the then Viceroy of India.

Wavell was promoted to captain on 28 January 1944, and awarded the Military Cross (MC) on 23 January 1947. Later that year he became Viscount Keren on his father being elevated to an earldom.

Wavell was promoted to major on 30 January 1949, and succeeded as 2nd Earl Wavell on the death of his father on 24 May 1950.

== Death ==
On 23 December 1953, Major Lord Wavell led a patrol of the Black Watch and Kenyan police in pursuit of a sixty-strong Mau Mau gang that had beheaded a loyal Kikuyu tribesman and then fled. Twenty of them were surrounded in a copse at Thika, 25 miles north of Nairobi. Wavell was shot and killed in the first contact of a 10-hour battle.

Wavell is buried in the City Park Cemetery, Nairobi, Block 12, grave 10. His headstone is inscribed with the epitaph: "He found the poetry of Man's endeavour". He is also commemorated by an inscription in the War Cloister at Winchester College, next to the School Cadet Corps Armoury. He died unmarried and without issue; his father having had no other male heirs, the earldom and two subsidiary viscountcies therefore became extinct on his death.

Peerage of the United Kingdom
Preceded by Archibald Wavell	Earl Wavell; 1950–1953	Extinct
