= Diploma in Digital Applications =

- Acronym: DiDA
- Type: Vocational
- Administrator: Edexcel
- Year started: 2004 (pilot); 2005
- Year terminated: 2020
- Duration: 2 years
- Offered: Annually
- Regions: England; Wales; Northern Ireland; Isle of Man
- Languages: English language
- Annual number of test takers: 200,000 students (2007)
- Website: Edexcel: DiDA

In England, Wales, Northern Ireland and the Isle of Man, the Diploma in Digital Applications for IT Users (DiDA) was a level 1/2 information and communication technology (ICT) course, usually studied during Key Stage 4 and equivalent to various GCSE levels. DiDA was introduced in 2005 (after a pilot in 2004) by the Edexcel examination board. DiDA was notable for its time in that it consisted entirely of computer based coursework; all work relating to the DiDA course was created, stored, assessed and moderated digitally. It was generally taught as a vocational alternative to GCSE ICT, similar in assessment to BTEC qualifications.

DiDA was unique in that its content focused on creative, media and business sector IT projects, of which Edexcel describe as 'designed to connect students more closely with their goals in further education or employment, as well as with other areas of the curriculum'. Although, Edexcel later in 2008 introduced a games authoring unit due to teacher demand for programming content. According to Wolf's Review on Vocational Education the pre-2012 specification, alongside many other GCSE equivalent vocational BTEC and OCR National level 1/2 qualifications at the time, was often taught by schools to inflate league table scores as the full diploma was initially equivalent to studying four GCSEs at once. This was addressed by a revised version from 2012 which introduced a practical on computer examined unit and was now only equivalent to 1 GCSE for CiDA and 2 GCSEs for DiDA. It was discontinued in 2020 during the GCSE 9-1 computing and ICT qualification reform alongside the now defunct GCSE ICT, replaced by similar courses such as the BTEC First Award in Information and Creative Technology and the BTEC Tech Award in Digital Information Technology.

== Course ==
The course consisted of five units. Using ICT is a compulsory unit, focused on IT skills such as online research, collating and analysing data using Excel spreadsheets and databases, the creation of Word, PowerPoint, Publisher and InDesign publications, image making and editing using Illustrator and creating digital portfolios and websites using Dreamweaver. Post 2012, this became a computer assessed exam.

Students then chose from four other optional units: Multimedia, Graphics, ICT in Enterprise and Computer Games Authoring. Those who chose one more unit would achieve a Certificate in Digital Applications (CiDA), equivalent to two GCSEs pre-2012 and one GCSE post-2012, which most schools opted for. Those who chose three more would gain the full Diploma in Digital Applications (DiDA), worth four GCSEs pre-2012 and two GCSEs post-2012.

Multimedia focused on the design and creation of integrated interactive digital media such as animations and interactive displays using Flash and audio visual material such as a promotional video or podcast. Graphics focused on the creation of web graphics and graphic products using Fireworks and Illustrator. ICT in Enterprise had students create their own enterprise with the use of IT, including the creation of a corporate identity, marketing strategy, business assets and promotional material such as a website. In response to centres wanting to teach more exciting and emerging IT skills such as introducing programming and games development to students, Computer Games Authoring was added in 2008, focusing on the design and development of an interactive computer game using software such as Missionmaker, Game Maker or Scratch.

== Grading ==
Pre-2012, the qualification was originally available either as the equivalent of one, two, three or four GCSEs as Award in Digital Applications (AiDA), Certificate in Digital Applications (CiDA), Extended Certificate in Digital Applications (CiDA+) or Diploma in Digital Applications (DiDA) respectively. This later changed alongside the new course in 2012 as CiDA equivalent to 1 GCSE and DiDA equivalent to 2 GCSEs, with AiDA and CiDA+ being phased out. The Level 2 course was equivalent to a GCSE Higher tier qualification, and the Level 1 course equivalent to GCSE Foundation tier.

Grade	Level 2 GCSE Equivalent	Level 1 GCSE Equivalent
Distinction (D)	A*	C
Merit (M)	A	D
Credit (C)	B	E
Pass (P)	C	F

The following modules were available, students chose from any one of the options alongside Using ICT for CiDA, and any three of the options alongside it for DiDA. Pre-2012, students could complete only Using ICT to obtain AiDA or could choose two additional options to obtain CiDA+.

- Using ICT (compulsory)
- Multimedia
- Graphics
- ICT in Enterprise
- Computer Games Authoring

== Adobe Certified Associate Certifications ==
Students who successfully completed units Multimedia and/or Graphics were eligible to claim Adobe Certified Associate certifications, provided they achieved a merit or distinction grade at Level 2 along with other requirements. There were three different types of certification available:

- Web Media using Dreamweaver - Multimedia
- Multimedia using Flash - Multimedia
- Web Graphics using Fireworks - Graphics

== Criticism ==
=== Pre-2012 use of vocational courses in league table score inflation ===
The qualification was initially designed in response to concerns that schools were using older GNVQ qualifications as a way to inflate their league table performance in the mid-2000s, including the GNVQ in ICT, as the GNVQ counted as four GCSEs but theoretically could be studied in the time of one. Although the DiDA course was significantly more rigorous and true to GCSE standard in comparison to the GNVQ, academies in particular still relied on DiDA, the OCR National in ICT and other vocational level 1/2 courses in the same way during the late 2000s, often by making it a compulsory subject for all GCSE level students. In response to this, DiDA, amongst other lCT qualifications, was revised in 2012, now counting as a single (CiDA) or dual (DiDA) GCSE equivalent qualification rather than four, matching Edexcel's GCSE ICT of the time, also popularly offered as a single or double award.

=== Difficulty and delivery issues ===
Edexcel developed the qualification to be large-scale project based to equip students with transferable skills for employment and to ensure its rigour was accurate to GCSE equivalence. As a result, many teachers commented that the volume of assessment evidence required to gain the then 4 GCSE equivalent full diploma was too difficult for most students. Due to this, many centres opted for the two unit, 2 GCSE equivalent CiDA option thereafter, or opted to switch to the equivalent OCR National in ICT, as they felt its paper assessment was more straightforward.

The qualification also had a reputation for being difficult to teach, the projects and their assessment often requiring a breadth of knowledge sometimes outside of the scope of ICT alone. Similarly, many centres did not have the teacher expertise to be able to offer the Adobe Associate Certifications, resulting in low adoption.
