= Archibald Wavell, 1st Earl Wavell =

British field marshal (1883–1950)

Field Marshal The Right Honourable The Earl Wavell GCB GCSI GCIE CMG MC PC
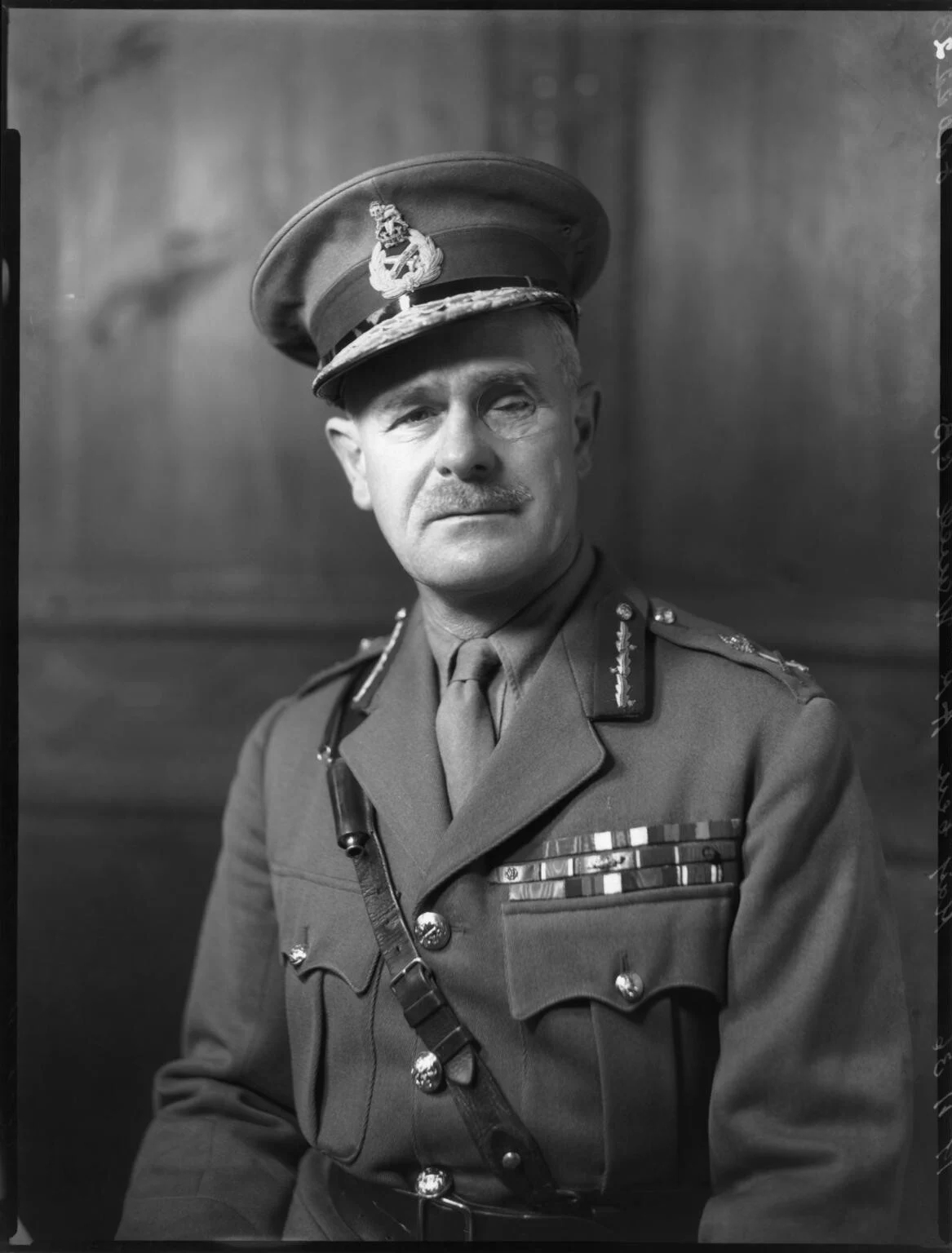
- Wavell in 1936

Viceroy and Governor-General of India
- In office 1 October 1943 – 21 February 1947
- Monarch: George VI
- Prime Minister: Winston Churchill (1943–1945); Clement Attlee (1945–1947)
- Preceded by: The Marquess of Linlithgow
- Succeeded by: The Viscount Mountbatten of Burma

Member of the House of Lords
- Lord Temporal
- In office 28 July 1943 – 24 May 1950; Hereditary peerage
- Preceded by: Peerage created
- Succeeded by: The 2nd Earl Wavell

Colonel of the Black Watch
- In office 1946–1950

Lord Lieutenant of the County of London
- In office 1949–1950
- Preceded by: The Duke of Wellington
- Succeeded by: The Viscount Allanbrooke

Constable of the Tower of London
- In office 1948–1950
- Preceded by: The Lord Chetwode
- Succeeded by: The Lord Wilson

Personal details
- Born: Archibald Percival Wavell; 5 May 1883 Colchester, Essex, England
- Died: 24 May 1950 (aged 67) Westminster, London, England
- Spouse: Eugenie Marie Quirk (m. 1915)
- Children: 4, including Archibald Wavell, 2nd Earl Wavell

Military service
- Allegiance: United Kingdom
- Branch/service: British Army
- Years of service: 1901–1943
- Rank: Field Marshal
- Unit: Black Watch (Royal Highland Regiment)
- Commands: American-British-Dutch-Australian Command; Commander-in-Chief, India; Middle East Command; Southern Command; British Troops Palestine and Trans-Jordan; 2nd Division; 6th Infantry Brigade
- Battles/wars: Second Boer War; First World War; Second Battle of Ypres; Sinai and Palestine Campaign; Arab revolt in Palestine; Second World War; North African Campaign; Pacific War; Malayan Campaign; Battle of Singapore
- Awards: Knight Grand Cross of the Order of the Bath; Knight Grand Commander of the Order of the Star of India; Knight Grand Commander of the Order of the Indian Empire; Companion of the Order of St Michael and St George; Military Cross; Knight of Justice of the Order of St. John; Order of St Stanislaus, 3rd class with Swords (Russia); Order of St. Vladimir (Russia); Croix de Guerre (France); Commander of the Legion of Honour (France); Order of El Nahda, 2nd Class (Hejaz); Grand Cross of the Order of George I with Swords (Greece); Virtuti Militari, 5th Class (Poland); War Cross, 1st Class (Greece); Commander of the Order of the Seal of Solomon (Ethiopia); Knight Grand Cross of the Order of Orange-Nassau (Netherlands); War Cross (Czechoslovakia); Chief Commander of the Legion of Merit (United States)

Field Marshal Archibald Percival Wavell, 1st Earl Wavell (5 May 1883 – 24 May 1950) was a senior officer of the British Army. He served in the Second Boer War, the Bazar Valley Campaign and the First World War, during which he was wounded in the Second Battle of Ypres. In the Second World War, he served initially as Commander-in-Chief Middle East, in which role he led British forces to victory over the Italian Army in Eritrea-Abyssinia, western Egypt and eastern Libya during Operation Compass in December 1940, only to be defeated by Erwin Rommel's Panzer Army Africa in the Western Desert in April 1941. He served as Commander-in-Chief, India, from July 1941 until June 1943 (apart from a brief tour as Commander of American-British-Dutch-Australian Command) and then served as Viceroy of India until his retirement in February 1947.

== Early life ==
Born the son of Archibald Graham Wavell (who later became a major-general in the British Army and military commander of Johannesburg after its capture during the Second Boer War) and Lillie Wavell (née Percival), Wavell attended Eaton House, followed by the leading preparatory boarding school Summer Fields in Oxford, Winchester College, where he was a scholar, and the Royal Military College, Sandhurst. His headmaster, Dr. Fearon, had advised his father that there was no need to send him into the Army as he had "sufficient ability to make his way in other walks of life".

== Early career ==
After graduating from Sandhurst, Wavell was commissioned into the British Army on 8 May 1901 as a second lieutenant in the Black Watch, and joined the 2nd battalion of his regiment in South Africa to fight in the Second Boer War. The battalion stayed in South Africa throughout the war, which formally ended in June 1902 after the Peace of Vereeniging. Wavell was ill, and did not immediately join the battalion as it transferred to British India in October that year; he instead left Cape Town for England on the SS Simla at the same time. In 1903 he was transferred to join the battalion in India and, having been promoted to lieutenant on 13 August 1904, he fought in the Bazar Valley Campaign of February 1908. In January 1909 he was seconded from his regiment to be a student at the Staff College. He was one of only two in his class to graduate with an A grade.

In 1911, he spent a year as a military observer with the Russian Army to learn Russian, returning to his regiment in December of that year. In September 1911, Wavell attended the annual war games of the Imperial Russian Army. He reported to London:

It was my first acquaintance with the Russian Army and practically the first acquaintance of the Russian Army with a British officer for many years...So I was quite a novelty and when for a formal parade, I put on the kilt I created a veritable sensation. I was impressed from the first with the Russian soldier, with his hardihood, physique, marching powers and discipline. But the lack of education of many of the regimental officers was noticeable.

After the Second Moroccan crisis of 1911, Wavell became convinced that a war with Germany was likely and that closer Anglo-Russian ties would be needed. Wavell reported to London that many elements in the Russian elite still hoped for a rapprochement with Germany against Britain or believed that a war against Germany was unlikely to occur; that much of the intelligentsia wanted Russia to lose a war against Germany as the best way to bring about a revolution; and that the Russian public in general did not care about foreign affairs at all.

In April 1912, he became a General Staff Officer Grade 3 (GSO3) in the Russian Section of the War Office. In July, he was granted the temporary rank of captain and became GSO3 at the Directorate of Military Training. On 20 March 1913 Wavell was promoted to the substantive rank of captain. After visiting manoeuvers at Kyiv in the summer of 1913, he was arrested at the Russo-Polish border as a suspected spy following the secret police's search of his Moscow hotel room. However, he managed to remove from his papers an incriminating document listing the information wanted by the War Office.

Wavell was working at the War Office when Army officers refused to act against Ulster unionists in March 1914; the government was expecting Unionist paramilitary opposition to introduction of devolved government in Ireland. His letters to his father record his disgust at the government's behaviour in giving an ultimatum to officers –he had little doubt that the government had been planning to crush the Ulster Scots, whatever they later claimed. However, he was also concerned at the Army's effectively intervening in politics, not least as there would be an even greater appearance of bias when the Army was used against industrial unrest.

== First World War ==
Wavell was working as a staff officer when the First World War began. As a captain, he was sent to France to a posting at General HQ of the British Expeditionary Force as General Staff Officer Grade 2 (GSO2), but shortly afterwards, in November 1914, was appointed brigade major of 9th Infantry Brigade. He was wounded in the Second Battle of Ypres of 1915, losing his left eye and winning the Military Cross. In October 1915 he became a GSO2 in the 64th Highland Division.

In December 1915, after he had recovered, Wavell was returned to General HQ in France as a GSO2. He was promoted to the substantive rank of major on 8 May 1916. In October 1916 Wavell was graded General Staff Officer Grade 1 (GSO1) as an acting lieutenant-colonel, and was then assigned as a liaison officer to the Russian Army in the Caucasus. Wavell called the Grand Duke Nicholas, the Viceroy of the Caucasus "the handsomest and most-impressive-looking man". However, Wavell charged that the Grand Duke, though an excellent host, failed to share much information about the Russian operations against the Ottoman Empire. Wavell learned about the state of Russian operations by looking at the divisional patches of Ottoman POWs, which he then matched with the known locations of the said Ottoman divisions. In June 1917, he was promoted to brevet lieutenant-colonel and continued to work as a staff officer (GSO1), as liaison officer with the Egyptian Expeditionary Force headquarters.

In January 1918 Wavell received a further staff appointment as an assistant adjutant and quartermaster-general (AA&QMG) working at the Supreme War Council in Versailles. In late March Wavell was made a temporary brigadier general although this only lasted for a few days before reverting to his previous rank, only to be promoted once again to temporary brigadier general in April, making him, at just 34, one of the youngest general officers in the British Army. He then returned to Palestine where he served as brigadier general, general staff (BGGS), effectively the chief of staff, of XX Corps, part of the Egyptian Expeditionary Force (EEF), until the war's end.

== Between the world wars ==
Wavell was given a number of assignments between the wars, though like many officers he had to accept a reduction in rank. In May 1920 he relinquished the temporary appointment of brigadier-general, reverting to lieutenant-colonel. In December 1921, he became an Assistant Adjutant General (AAG) at the War Office and, having been promoted to full colonel on 3 June 1921, he became a GSO1 in the Directorate of Military Operations at the War Office in July 1923.

Apart from a short period unemployed on half pay in 1926, Wavell continued to hold GSO1 appointments, latterly in the 3rd Infantry Division, until July 1930 when he was given command of 6th Infantry Brigade with the temporary rank of brigadier. In March 1932, he was appointed aide-de-camp (ADC) to King George V, a position he held until October 1933 when he was promoted to Major-General. However, there was a shortage of jobs for major-generals at this time and in January 1934, on relinquishing command of his brigade, he found himself unemployed on half pay once again.

By the end of the year, although still on half pay, Wavell had been designated to command 2nd Division and appointed a CB. In March 1935, he took command of his division. In August 1937 he was transferred to Palestine, where there was growing unrest, to be General Officer Commanding (GOC) British Forces in Palestine and Trans-Jordan and was promoted to Lieutenant-General on 21 January 1938. During his time in Palestine, Wavell found himself leading a counter-insurgency campaign against the Palestinian fedayeen (guerrillas) who had risen up in 1936. Wavell refused to proclaim martial law on the grounds that he did not have enough troops to enforce it. Wavell was opposed to Zionism and thought that the Balfour Declaration had been a mistake as the promise of British support for a "Jewish national home" in Palestine led to militant anti-British feelings throughout the Islamic world. In common with many British Army officers, Wavell disliked prime minister Neville Chamberlain less because of appeasement, but rather because of Chamberlain's "limited liability" rearmament policy. Under that policy, the Royal Air Force was given first priority in terms of defence spending, the Royal Navy the second and the Army the third. Like many British Army officers, Wavell charged that the policy left the Army starved of funds, based on the unrealistic assumption that Britain could win a major war by only fighting in the air and on the sea while barely doing any fighting on land.

In April 1938 Wavell became General Officer Commanding-in-Chief (GOC-in-C) Southern Command in the UK. In February 1939, Wavell delivered the Lee-Knowles lectures at Cambridge. In July 1939, he was named as General Officer Commanding-in-Chief of Middle East Command with the local rank of full general. Subsequently, on 15 February 1940, to reflect the broadening of his oversight responsibilities to include East Africa, Greece and the Balkans, his title was changed to Commander-in-Chief Middle East. By the time, Wavell returned to the Middle East, the revolt in Palestine had finally been put down with the last of the fedayeen bands being hunted down or laying down their arms by the summer of 1939. Germany and Italy had signed the Pact of Steel, a defensive-offensive military alliance, on 22 May 1939. As the Danzig crisis had pushed Britain to the brink of war with the Reich in the summer of 1939, Wavell assumed that war was near, and that should Germany invade Poland, it was almost certain that Italy would enter the war at some point. Wavell wrote an anti-appeasement poem about the Danzig crisis that read in jest: "Lord Halifax is ready/To take off for Berlin/And if he gives them Danzig/We might just save our skin/Why should we do the fighting?/The Jews will stand to gain/We are the ones who'll suffer/If England fights again". Wavell complained in a letter in August 1939 of "wishful thinking" in Britain about the Danzig crisis as he wrote: "News smells of mustard gas and antiseptics and other unpleasant things".

The British official whom Wavell met in a "weekly waffle" from August 1939 onward was Sir Miles Lampson, the Ambassador to Egypt, who was regarded as the senior British official in the Middle East. Lampson described Wavell as shy and reserved, but "that when one gets to know him better, he is rather a good fellow". On 18 August 1939 in a conference held abroad the battleship HMS Warspite in Alexandria harbour, Wavell first held a meeting with Admiral Andrew Cunningham, the GOC of the British Mediterranean fleet and Air Marshal William Mitchell, the GOC of RAF Middle East to discuss the plans to be executed if the Danzig crisis should turn to war. Wavell was a frequent visitor to Alexandria as Cunningham chose to command the Mediterranean fleet from the Warspite. Because of the "limited liability" doctrine which governed British defence spending, Wavell's Middle East command was short of modern equipment, and the American historian Robin Higham wrote Wavell's forces were fitted for "a 1898 'Fuzzy-Wuzzy' colonial war" and nothing else. On 1 September 1939, Germany invaded Poland. Wavell was angry about what he regarded as the weakness of Chamberlain about honouring the British "guarantee" of Poland as he wrote to Lord Gort (the Chief of the Imperial General Staff (Note: Gort was replaced by Edmind Ironside on 3 September so that he could lead the British Expeditionary Force in France)) on 2 September 1939 that Chamberlain was "making a rather pompous, long-winded, old-fashioned" entry in the war as he was surprised that the United Kingdom had not declared war on Germany the previous day. On 3 September 1939, Britain declared war on Germany and Wavell immediately put the British forces in the Middle East on the highest state of alert. Wavell's first action was to order General Richard O'Connor, the GOC of the 7th British Division (which was confusingly renamed the 6th Division while another division was renamed 7th Division) to move his formation from Palestine to the Egyptian-Libyan border as Wavell believed it was only a matter of time before Italy entered war. Wavell's next step was to go to Beirut to meet General Maxime Weygand, the commander of the Armée du Levant, to discuss Anglo-French war plans. He reported that Weygand was a "sagacious ally" whose thinking about opening a front in the Balkans was very close to his own.

== Second World War military commands ==
=== Middle East Command (incl. North and East Africa) ===
The Middle Eastern theatre was quiet for the first few months of the war until Italy's declaration of war on 10 June 1940. On 17 October 1939, Wavell had signed the Anglo-French-Turkish alliance, which was hoped in London would bring Turkey into the war. At an Anglo-French war conference in Vincennes in December 1939, Wavell had strongly supported the call by General Maxime Weygand to take the Armée du Levant from Beirut to Thessaloniki, saying he saw much potential to opening a Balkan front similar to the First World War Salonika Front. In February 1940, Wavell first met Dominions secretary Anthony Eden who had gone to Port Said to greet the arrival of the first Australian and New Zealand troops to Egypt. Eden was later to write: "I liked [Wavell] from this first meeting and our friendship was to grow very close and last until his death". Wavell's relations with the Australians and the New Zealanders were to be difficult as both Canberra and Wellington wanted to keep control of their own forces.

In March 1940, Wavell made a lengthy visit to South Africa to ask the South African prime minister Jan Smuts if South African troops could go to Egypt; the response was negative as Smuts supported the war, but many of his fellow Afrikaners did not. Mitchell was replaced as the RAF GOC by Air Marshal Arthur Longmore who with support of Wavell fought hard for modern aircraft to be sent to the Middle East as the RAF forces stationed in the Middle East were equipped with antiquated aircraft.

When Italy entered the war, the Italian forces in North and East Africa greatly outnumbered the British and Wavell's policy was therefore one of "flexible containment" to buy time to build up adequate forces to take the offensive. In June 1940, Wavell had only two British Army divisions (36,000 men) to defend Egypt against a much larger Italian army in Libya while also having to deal with an Egyptian government whose loyalty to the Allies was questionable. The Royal Egyptian Army was not well regarded, but the possibility that King Farouk of Egypt would join the Axis powers meant that Wavell always had to keep forces in the Nile river valley instead of in the Western Desert. Wavell disliked King Farouk whom he described as an immature and pompous teenager who did little to conceal his anti-British feelings. British interests in the theatre were to protect the Suez Canal, which required command of the Mediterranean sea, known as the "lifeline of the Empire" where shipping went back and forth from the United Kingdom to Australia, New Zealand, India and the other British Asian colonies. Closely linked to the first interest was the desire to defend the oil fields in Iran and Iraq where Britain obtained much of its oil, which travelled via tankers to Britain using the Suez Canal-Mediterranean route. Italian entry into the war closed the central Mediterranean to British shipping, which had to use the long route around Africa, which in effect was the same as severing the Suez canal, but the American historian Robin Higham wrote that no-one in London ever gave a serious reappraisal of what should be British grand strategy in the Middle East beyond defeating Italy as the best way to reopen the Mediterranean to British shipping. Higham wrote that much of Wavell's problems stemmed from the lack of a clear strategy in London about precisely he should have been doing.

On 21 June 1940 upon hearing of the French surrender, Wavell sent out an order of the day to the British and Australian troops under his command reading: "Our gallant French allies have been overwhelmed after a desperate struggle and have been compelled to ask for terms. The British Empire will of course continue the struggle until victory has been won. Dictators fade away. The British Empire never dies". Wavell had a strong belief in the British Empire, and throughout his career he made references to serving the empire as the motivating force for his military career as despite being a career soldier, he maintained that he did not particularly like war. In July 1940, Wavell went to Khartoum where the Emperor Haile Selassie had set up a government-in-exile and Wavell discussed plans with the emperor for British support for Ethiopian guerrillas.

==== Tension with Churchill ====
During a visit to London, Wavell first met the prime minister Winston Churchill on 12 August 1940. After the meeting, Eden wrote in his diary that Churchill called Wavell a "good, average colonel" and the sort of a man who would make for a good chairman of a local Conservative Party constituency association in the suburbs of London (not a compliment on Churchill's part). Wavell did not enjoy the confidence of Churchill who felt he was not aggressive enough. Unlike the loquacious Churchill, Wavell was a quiet, reserved man, and Churchill tended to take Wavell's laconic statements as a sign that he lacked aggression. In addition, Wavell was a poet, which Churchill saw as too "soft" and inappropriate for a British Army general. In the summer of 1940, Churchill was intent on sacking Wavell and replacing him with one of his favourite generals, Bernard Freyberg, and was only stopped by objections from the War Office that Freyberg lacked the necessary experience for Middle East Command. Eden, whose judgement Churchill respected, lobbied the prime minister hard to keep Wavell as the GOC Middle East, and for the moment Wavell was retained.

In addition, Churchill and Wavell had clashed over the "Palestine Question". Churchill had wanted to arm the Jewish population of the Palestine Mandate (modern Israel) as a militia to assist with the defence of the Middle East, a plan that Wavell had vetoed. In the first draft of Their Finest Hour, Book 2 of his memoirs/history of the Second World War, Churchill had written: "All our military men disliked the Jews and loved the Arabs. General Wavell was no exception. Some of my trusted ministers like Lord Lloyd and of course, the Foreign Office, were all pro-Arab if they not actually anti-Semitic". This line was removed from the final draft of Their Finest Hour, but it reflected Churchill's feelings about Wavell. On 11 August 1940, the Italians invaded the colony of British Somaliland (modern northern Somalia) and faced with overwhelming Italian numbers, Wavell ordered General Reade Godwin-Austen to evacuate to Aden. On 18 August 1940, the last British forces left Berbera. During the brief campaign, the British lost 260 men (38 killed and 222 wounded) against the Italian loss of 1,800 (465 killed, 38 missing and the rest wounded). Wavell received what he called a "red-hot cable" from Churchill complaining that the British forces in British Somaliland must had fought poorly as hardly any British soldiers had been killed. Wavell wrote back that "a 'big butcher's bill' was not necessarily evidence of good tactics", a remark that greatly angered Churchill.

==== Defence of Egypt ====
In the summer and autumn of 1940, the British garrison in Egypt was reinforced by tanks from the United Kingdom and additional troops, which came primarily from India, New Zealand and Australia. In a bold move despite the risk that Germany would invade the United Kingdom that summer, in August 1940 154 tanks (half of the tanks in Britain) were sent to Egypt via the shorter and more dangerous Mediterranean route. A major problem for Wavell was that the threat of Italian air and naval attacks had generally closed the central Mediterrean to British shipping, which had to reach Egypt via the long route around Africa, adding an extra 12,000 miles to the voyage from Britain to Egypt. Adding to Wavell's problems was that the Admiralty and War Office miscounted the number of ships available to take supplies to Egypt by including the Greek Merchant Marine and the Norwegian Merchant Marine into the British Merchant Marine and then counting the ships separately as part of their respective national merchant marines; not until April 1941 was this error corrected.

The arrival of the Second Australian Imperial Force to Egypt produced much dismay amongst the Egyptians as the First Australian Imperial Force in World War One had been notorious for its heavy drinking and debauchery in the bars and brothels in Cairo, and Wavell was forced to issue a promise that this time the Australians would be better behaved. Despite Wavell's promises, the Australians during their leave times lived riotously in the bars and brothels in Cairo, and there were more complaints about conduct of the Australians than any of the other Allied soldiers in Egypt. The 7th British Armoured Division, which Wavell chose to spearhead the offensive, was described by the American historians Williamson Murray and Allan R. Millett as an "excellent" division made of "first-class" troops. Murray and Millet also described the other two divisions selected by Wavell to lead the offensive, namely the 4th Indian Division and the 6th Australian Division as high-quality divisions, which like the 7th Armoured Division were to greatly distinguish themselves in the fighting in Africa. At a conference in Khartoum with the South African prime minister, Jan Smuts, Wavell came under strong pressure to invade Italian East Africa as soon as possible as Smuts expressed fears of an Italian conquest of Kenya, and then of Northern Rhodesia (modern Zambia) and Southern Rhodesia (modern Zimbabwe). Smuts also demanded that the Italian naval base at Kismayu be taken as soon as possible lest the Regia Marina cut off South Africa from the sea. As Smuts was a close friend of Churchill, he soon brought Churchill over to his viewpoint.

==== Italian Invasion of Greece ====
On 28 October 1940 Italy invaded Greece. Britain had a legal and moral commitment to help Greece because of the guarantee issued on 13 April 1939, (Note: This was one of several guarantees issued after Germany broke the September 1938 Munich Agreement by occupying the rump of Czecho-Slovakia (the first and most important had been the March 1939 Polish guarantee, which led to Britain's entry into the war in September 1939)) promising to defend Greece against any power that attacked it. In October–November 1940, Anthony Eden, now Secretary of State for War, made an extended visit to the Middle East to see Wavell who told him about his plans for an offensive in the Western Desert. On 3 November 1940, Eden cabled Churchill that Wavell had a plan for an offensive and that it was imperative that no British forces be sent to Greece. Churchill did not tell the War Cabinet about this cable and on 4 November 1940 secured the approval of the War Cabinet to send aid to Greece. On 8 November 1940, Churchill finally informed the War Cabinet of Wavell's planned offensive and that of his wish to not send any forces to Greece.

Wavell made it clear to Churchill throughout the winter of 1940–1941 that he did not want any forces diverted from Egypt to Greece. The Greek dictator, General Ioannis Metaxas did not want British Army troops in Greece, saying he only needed 5 squadrons of Royal Air Force fighters to assist the Royal Hellenic Air Force against the Regia Aeronautica. Metaxas was very confident that the Royal Hellenic Army was more than capable of defending Greece from the Regio Esercito without British troops. However, Churchill saw Greece as the key to winning the war as British bombers could use Greek airfields to attack the Romanian oil fields, which supplied the Reich with its oil. In addition, Churchill wanted to revive the Salonika Front strategy of World War One by bringing Yugoslavia and Turkey into the war, which he believed would bog the Wehrmacht down in the Balkans. Metaxas had wanted to keep Greece neutral, and only became involved in the war when confronted with an Italian ultimatum demanding that Greece become an Italian colony. Throughout the winter of 1940–1941, Metaxas had sought German mediation to end the war with Italy, and promised Hitler that he would never allow British bombers to strike the oil fields of Romania. Metaxas failed to recognise that his promises made no difference to Adolf Hitler, and the mere fact that Greece was allied to Great Britain led Hitler to decide to invade Greece. Hitler would not tolerate even a theoretical threat to bomb the oil fields of Romania, a determination that later led him to embark on the costly Battle of Crete as he was convinced that the British would use the airfields in Crete for that purpose.

==== Offensives in Egypt and Ethiopia ====
Having fallen back in front of Italian advances from their colonies Libya and Eritrea towards (respectively) Egypt and Ethiopia, Wavell mounted successful offensives into Libya (Operation Compass) in December 1940 and Eritrea and Ethiopia in January 1941. On 8 December 1940, Wavell called a press conference where he told the assembled British and Australian journalists:

Gentleman, I asked you to come here this morning to let you know that we have attacked in the Western Desert. This is not an offensive and I do not think you ought to describe it as an offensive. You might call it an important raid. The attack was made early this morning and I had word a hour ago that the first of the Italian camps have fallen.

In the Battle of Sidi Barrani, which began on 9 December 1940, a numerically superior Italian force was overwhelmed by a mixed force of British, Indian and Australian troops. The battle ended with three Italian divisions surrendering and the Italians almost pushed back into their colony of Libya. After the victory, Wavell pulled out the 4th Indian Division and sent it south to take retake Kassala in the Sudan in order to appease Smuts. O'Connor felt it was a mistake to pull out the elite 4th Indian Division from the Western Desert. On 3 January 1941, Wavell launched a new offensive that saw the destruction of what was left of the Italian 10th Army and the capture of the Cyrenaica province of Libya. On 8 January 1941, Wavell with Major William J. Donovan who was visiting Egypt as the personal representative of President Roosevelt, who often sent out his close friends on diplomatic missions. Wavell told Donovan that he saw little hope in success in Churchill's plans to bomb the Romanian Ploesti oil fields as the Germans had constructed a powerful air defence system around them. Wavell stated that air defence system of radar stations, searchlights, flak batteries, and fighter squadrons would make it almost impossible to bomb the oil fields. On 13 January 1941, Wavell on Churchill's orders visited Athens to meet Metaxas to offer British Army forces to the mainland of Greece, and seemed privately relieved when Metaxas refused his offer. During his visit to Athens, Field Marshal Alexandros Papagos, the Commander-in-Chief of the Greek Army, told Wavell that the German build-up of Wehrmacht forces in Bulgaria was highly concerning to the Greeks, and that Greece would need at least nine British Army divisions to hold the Greek-Yugoslav frontier where the Metaxas line ended. Wavell told Papagos that he did not have nine divisions to spare for the defence of Greece.

On 20 January 1941, the Emperor Haile Selassie returned to Ethiopia in the company of Wavell's favourite guerrilla fighter Orde Wingate, and the news of his return sparked a fast-spreading rebellion all over Ethiopia, which tied down a significant number of Italian forces (see East African campaign (World War II)). On 26 January 1941, Churchill in a cable to Wavell expressed the hope that the British would soon take all of Libya and urged him to start planning for an invasion of Sicily to be launched later in 1941. In the same telegram, Churchill expressed much anger at Wavell for refusing Smuts's offer of a South African division to Egypt unless the South Africans supplied of all the division's needs. The war had badly divided the Afrikaners into a pro-British "liberal" faction that supported fighting for Britain versus the pro-German "republican" faction that wanted to see South Africa fight for the Axis. Churchill accused Wavell of being politically naïve, as Churchill argued that having a South African division fighting in Egypt would win the Afrikaners over to supporting the war and told Wavell to supply the South African division out of his supplies. Wavell responded on 27 January 1941 that the main limits on his forces were logistical and he needed more transport vehicles. Wavell also complained that stockpiling supplies for the planned invasion of Rhodes was forcing him to hold back on supplies for North Africa. By February 1941, Wavell's Western Desert Force under Lieutenant-General Richard O'Connor had defeated the Italian Tenth Army at the Battle of Beda Fomm taking 130,000 prisoners and appeared to be on the verge of overrunning the last Italian forces in Libya, which would have ended all direct Axis control in North Africa. On 29 January 1941, Metaxas died, and his successor as prime minister of Greece, Alexandros Koryzis, was unable to stand up to the British Foreign Secretary, Anthony Eden (Eden had been moved from the War Office to the Foreign Office in December 1940), who pressed him very strongly to allow more British forces into Greece.

In February 1941, Wavell launched an offensive into the colony of Italian East Africa with the British advancing into what is now Somalia from Kenya and making amphibious landings in Somaliland and Eritrea. On 11 February 1941, a landing was made in Italian Somaliland and on 14 February 1941, Kismayu, one of the principal Italian naval bases on the Indian Ocean was captured by 12th African Division. A force of Ethiopian guerrillas, known as Gideon Force, under the command of Orde Wingate operated effectively behind Italian lines and advanced on Addis Ababa. On 25 February 1941, Mogadishu was taken and on 16 March 1941 Berbera was retaken. His troops in East Africa also had the Italians under pressure and at the end of March his forces in Eritrea under William Platt won the decisive battle of the campaign at Keren which led to the liberation of Ethiopia and the British occupation of the Italian colonies of Eritrea and Somaliland.

==== Defence of Greece ====
In February Wavell had been ordered to halt his advance into Libya and send troops to intervene in the Battle of Greece. Between 12 and 19 February 1941, a mission headed by Anthony Eden (now Foreign Secretary) and the Chief of the Imperial General Staff General Sir John Dill was in Cairo, during which time Wavell changed his views on the proposed Greek expedition. Wavell's volte-face on the Greek expedition seems to have been motivated partly out by the belief that with German forces massing in Bulgaria with the clear intention of invading Greece it was a matter of British honour to respect the "guarantee" of Greece made on 13 April 1939 and do something to help the Greeks. Wavell also felt the Greek expedition fitted in with the British objective of bringing the United States into the war. The U.S. president Franklin D. Roosevelt had leaned into a pro-Allied neutrality since the start of the war, but much of American public and Congressional opinion was solidly isolationist, and Wavell wrote that to not help the Greeks would have a "deplorable" effect on American public opinion. In an attempt to appeal to American public opinion, British decision-makers had consistently portrayed the war against Nazi Germany as a crusade against evil. Wavell argued that an expedition to Greece would fit in very well with the image that Britain sought to project in the United States of being an enlightened, caring nation whose moral values were almost the same as those of the United States, especially as Congress was still debating the Lend-Lease bill at the time. The crucial moment in the change in Wavell's stance appears to have been a meeting in Cairo on 19 February 1941 attended by Wavell, Dill, Eden and Donovan during which Donovan strongly stressed that American public opinion would be strongly impressed by an expedition to Greece, which Donovan stated would improve the odds of Congress passing the Lend-Lease bill. On 20 February 1941, another meeting in Cairo attended by Dill, Wavell and Eden ended with the conclusion "there was agreement upon utmost help to Greece at the earliest possible moment".

On 17 February 1941, Wavell met with the Australian prime minister Robert Menzies in Cairo, during which Wavell mentioned that Churchill was planning to revive the First World War Salonika Front and was talking about sending the three Australian divisions to Greece. Wavell asked for freedom to move about the Second Australian Imperial Force as needed, a request that was granted by Menzies, who insisted for domestic political reasons that the three Australian divisions be kept together. Menzies argued that the Australian people needed to see their forces fighting together for Australia and keeping the Australian divisions apart would make it seem like Australia was only serving British interests. The British had broken the Luftwaffe codes and both Wavell and Churchill believed that there would not be a German offensive in Libya on the basis of Hitler's orders to Erwin Rommel of the Afrika Korps in February 1941 to only defend the Italian colony of Libya lest its loss bring down the Fascist regime in Italy. However, Rommel was determined to launch an unauthorised offensive to win himself glory. Wavell had broken up the British XIII Corps by sending the 4th Indian Division to Ethiopia and the 6th Australian Division to Greece. Wavell had replaced O'Connor with General Sir Philip Neame, who had no experience of desert warfare. The new GOC of the 2nd British Armoured Division, Major-General Michael Gambier-Parry was likewise new to desert warfare. Rommel soon learned from reconnaissance that the British forces in the Western Desert, at the end of a long supply line, were not prepared for a German offensive. The British stopped their advance into Libya at El Agheila while the 7th Armoured Division was returned to Egypt to be replaced by the 2nd Armoured Division. In early 1941, the 6th British Division was training in Egypt for amphibious operations for an invasion of Rhodes as Churchill hoped that seizing the Italian Dodecanese islands might bring Turkey into the war.

The Greeks had committed most of the divisions of the Royal Hellenic Army to the front in Epirus and pushed into the Italian colony of Albania while the remainder of the Greek Army held the Metaxas Line along the Greek-Bulgarian border. The Metaxas line did not extend along the Greek–Yugoslav border as Yugoslavia was a Greek ally while Bulgaria claimed parts of northern Greece (see Macedonian Struggle). Along the Greek-Yugoslav border the Monastir Gap in the mountains forms a natural invasion route into northern Greece. The Greeks had wanted Force W to hold the Greek-Yugoslav border, but Wavell chose the Aliakmon line further south on the grounds that Force W was too small to hold the entirety of the Greek–Yugoslav border. Even then, Wavell admitted that Force W was too small to hold the Aliakmon line either. Wavell also admitted that a strong German offensive down the Monastir Gap could outflank both the Metaxas line and the Aliakmon line, but he concluded that the 16 divisions of the Yugoslav Royal Army should be able to delay the Germans in Yugoslav Macedonia (modern North Macedonia) for some time. Wavell's staff officers led by Freddie de Guingand stated that Britain did not have sufficient troops to defend Greece, and favoured an advance to drive the Italians out of Libya. De Guingand believed that if the British reached the Libyan-Tunisian border, French officials in Tunisia, where it was known that several French garrison officers were lukewarm in their loyalty to Vichy France, would defect over to the Free French. Wavell's staff had argued that Allied control of Libya and Tunisia would enable Allied shipping to pass through the central Mediterranean to Egypt rather than via the long route around Africa.

At War Cabinet meeting in London on 24 February 1941, papers written by Eden were presented which argued for the expedition. By all accounts, Eden was the minister most in favour of the expedition, which he believed would cause Turkey to enter the war on the Allied side. Churchill stated at the meeting that Wavell was in favour of the expedition, saying he "was inclined to understatement and so far had always promised less than what he had delivered". The three service chiefs, namely Dill, the First Sea Lord Admiral Dudley Pound and the Chief of the Air Staff Sir Charles Portal, all spoke in favour of the expedition, but protected themselves from any future criticism by citing Wavell's opinion as the primary reason for their approval. Menzies, who attended the War Cabinet, felt that there was a lack of discussion about the merits of the Greek expedition. After visiting Ankara to meet President İsmet İnönü, Eden and Dill returned to Athens on 2 March 1941 to find that Alexandros Papagos had refused to redeploy the Royal Hellenic Army to the Aliakhmon Line as he had promised in February, saying he was not going to abandon northern Greece without a fight. Wavell was summoned to Athens, where he was unable to change Papagos's mind. On 6 March 1941, the South African prime minister General Jan Smuts arrived in Cairo for a conference with Wavell, during which he strongly expressed support for the Greek expedition. Smuts was Churchill's favourite Dominion prime minister, and the one whose military advice he was most likely to follow as Churchill believed him to be a military genius after his leading role in the Second Boer War. The American historian Robin Higham described Smuts as playing a "sinister" role in British decision-making during both world wars as Smuts was grossly overrated as a general and his ideas about strategy were consistently wrong; his endorsement of the Greek expedition played a major role in silencing any criticism.

On 25 March 1941 Yugoslavia joined the Axis Tripartite Pact, but did not grant the Germans transit rights, which would have forced Wehrmacht forces in Bulgaria to attack Greece through the Metaxas Line. Later on 25 March 1941, a military coup in Belgrade overthrew the Regent, Crown Prince Paul, which led Hitler to invade Yugoslavia as well as Greece and led the Wehrmacht generals to use their preferred plan to bypass the Metaxas Line by invading Yugoslav Macedonia. The new government in Belgrade refused to antagonise Hitler by mobilising the Yugoslav military and spread out the Yugoslav forces too thin to defend the whole of Yugoslavia. These decisions caused the rapid defeat of Yugoslavia. The result was a disaster. The Germans were given the opportunity to reinforce the Italians in North Africa with the Afrika Korps and by the end of April the weakened Western Desert Force had been pushed back to the Egyptian border, leading to the Siege of Tobruk.

==== Retreats in Greece and North Africa ====
On 31 March 1941, the Afrika Korps went on the offensive and rapidly pushed back the Commonwealth forces into Egypt. Inspired by the German victories, on 3 April 1941 a group of pro-German Iraqi Army generals staged a coup in Baghdad and installed the pro-Axis Rashid Ali al-Gaylani as the new prime minister of Iraq. King Farouk of Egypt leaned into a pro-Axis neutrality and because of the uncertain attitude of the Egyptian Army, Wavell was forced to keep one of the Australian divisions intended for Greece in Egypt. Wavell suspected with good reason that Farouk was in contact with German and Italian agents, and that Egypt would join the Axis the moment that Axis forces reached the Nile river valley. On 6 April 1941, the Germans invaded Greece and Yugoslavia. Of the two divisions and one brigade that made up General Henry Wilson's Force W, the 2nd New Zealand Division and the 1st British Armoured Brigade were just taking up their positions on the Aliakhmon Line in central Greece while the 6th Australian Division was in the process of disembarking in Piraeus. The only good news for Wavell that day was that the British had taken Addis Ababa. Also on 6 April 1941, Wavell decided to hold Tobruk, after receiving assurances from Admiral Andrew Cunningham that it could be resupplied from the sea, on the grounds that the Afrika Korps would not be able to advance any further. Wavell believed that with the port of Tobruk, the Afrika Korps would probably be able to take Alexandria and without Tobruk it could not. On 8 April 1941, Wavell personally visited Tobruk to inspect its defence. The first combat with the Wehrmacht in Greece occurred on 9 April 1941 as the unmobilised and thinly spread Royal Yugoslav Army was promptly defeated and the German XXXX Panzer Corps having smashed way into Yugoslav Macedonia turned south through the Monastir Gap into Greece.

On 11 April 1941, Wavell visited Athens to meet with General Henry Maitland Wilson, GOC of Force W along with Thomas Blamey, the GOC of the 6th Australian Division and Bernard Freyberg, GOC of the New Zealand Division. With the Germans having advanced into northern Greece, Wavell decided that the Aliakhmon line was indefensible and ordered Force W to retreat south with the aim of holding the Thermopylae Pass. On 13 April, Wavell returned to Cairo and on 15 April 1941 he decided that Greece could not be held and that Force W should be withdrawn before the entire expeditionary force was lost. On 16 April 1941, Papagos requested that the British pull out what was left of the Greek Army and on the same day Wavell passed along that request to Churchill. Later the same day, Churchill granted his approval for a retreat from the mainland of Greece. The British and New Zealand troops holding the Thermopylae line fought bravely, but the lack of air support and devastating attack from Stuka dive bombers forced their retreat.

In North Africa, the Afrika Korps could not advance further without the port of Tobruk to bring in supplies, and the 9th Australian Division holding Tobruk beat off a series of German attacks between 11 and 18 April 1941. With the Germans stopped outside Tobruk, Wavell returned to Greece on 19 April 1941, where he found a chaotic situation as Greek Prime Minister Alexandros Koryzis had committed suicide on 18 April. On 20 April 1941, Wavell met with King George II of Greece and gained his approval for the evacuation. Wavell ruled that Piraeus could not be used because of Luftwaffe air superiority and instead Force W would have to leave via the beaches. For five days starting on 24 April 1941, Force W was evacuated amid Dunkirk-like scenes under heavy German air attacks on various Greek beaches. By 29 April 1941, the last Commonwealth forces had been pulled out of Greece, having suffered 15,000 casualties and leaving behind all their heavy equipment and artillery. Force W withdrew to Crete.

==== Victory in Ethiopia ====
Further south, the successful campaign in the Horn of Africa led to the Emperor Haile Selassie returning to his throne and the surrender of 100,000 Italian soldiers under the command of the Duke of Aosta. Benito Mussolini had claimed the conquest of Ethiopia in 1936 as his greatest accomplishment, and the liberation of Ethiopia in 1941 was a great blow to the prestige of the Fascist regime. On 11 April 1941, President Franklin D. Roosevelt announced that the Red Sea was no longer a war zone and as the US was still officially neutral, American merchantmen and tankers could now travel the Red Sea to Egypt, which greatly reduced the demands placed on British shipping.

On 23 April 1941, General Charles de Gaulle arrived in Cairo to ask Wavell for permission for Free French forces to use the Palestine Mandate to invade the French mandates of Syria and Lebanon ruled by General Henri Dentz, who was loyal to Vichy France.

==== Battle of Crete ====
On 26 April 1941, Wavell first learned via Ultra of Unternehmen Merkur, the German plan for an airborne invasion of Crete. On 30 April 1941, Wavell visited Crete, where at a meeting in Canae he expressed much approval of Freyberg as GOC of Crete, saying that Freyberg had won the Victoria Cross in 1916 and that he was a very brave, tough soldier. During the same visit, Wavell told Wilson that "I want you to go to Jerusalem and relieve Baghdad", saying the new regime in Iraq had joined the war on the Axis side.

In the Battle of Crete German airborne forces attacked on 20 May and as in Greece, the British and Commonwealth troops were forced once more to evacuate. The Anglo-Greek-Australian-New Zealander forces had been evacuated to Crete, and placed under the command of Freyberg. Churchill had personally insisted on Freyberg being given the Crete command. For Unternehmen Merkur (Operation Mercury), the invasion of Crete, the Germans had committed the Fallschirmjägerkorps (i.e. the Parachute Corps) of the Luftwaffe. As the British had broken the Luftwaffe codes, the entire German plans for Operation Merkur was known in advance. However, Freyberg refused to believe the Ultra intelligence which warned him of an airborne assault and even named the three Cretan airfields targeted, and persisted in keeping the majority of his forces on the coast to resist a seaborne invasion. Freyberg regarded Crete as strategically unimportant, and was not aware of Hitler's fears that the British would use airfields on Crete to bomb the Ploesti oil fields on which Germany depended. Freyberg's son claimed in the 1970s that Wavell had let Freyberg in on the Ultra secret shortly before Operation Mercury was launched, but also told him that would could not move his forces away from the coast to protect the three airfields as that might tip the Germans off that the Luftwaffe codes had been broken.

During the hard-fought Battle of Crete, the British, Greek, Australian and New Zealander forces put up a ferocious resistance, and the invasion of Crete nearly turned into a German defeat as the Fallschirmjäger took heavy losses and two of the three airfields were successfully held. British and Australian forces inflicted heavy losses on the Germans at Heraklion air field and Greek and Australian forces were equally successful in holding the Rethymno airfield. General Kurt Student, the commander of the Fallschirmjäger, nearly cancelled Operation Mercury as reports of the German failures come in, but Hitler insisted on continuing the operation. The Allied successes against the elite Fallschirmjäger at Heraklion and Rethymno were especially striking as Freyberg continued to regard these landings as a diversion and kept the majority of his forces on the coast. However, Brigadier L.W Andrew of the 22nd New Zealand Battalion unwisely pulled his forces back from Maleme airfield, which allowed the Germans to fly in heavy forces to Crete. The Allied forces defending Crete were lightly armed as they had abandoned all of their heavy equipment on the Greek mainland, and once Maleme airfield was lost, so was Crete. Churchill, who believed the Allies were on the brink of a great victory, continued to bombard Wavell with telegrams demanding he sent more forces to Crete. On 22 May 1941, the New Zealanders failed to recapture Maleme airfield and on 25 May the Germans captured Galatas. A counter-attack by the New Zealanders halted the German advance for the moment. Churchill was notably angry when Wavell reported to him that Germans had air superiority made it impossible to send tanks to Crete. On 26 May Freyberg asked Wavell for permission to evacuate his forces to Egypt as defending Crete was hopeless. On 27 May 1941, Wavell reported to London that the situation in Crete was "no longer tenable" and recommended a retreat to Egypt as otherwise all of the Allied forces in Crete would be lost.

Owing to the strength of German air attacks on the northern shore of Crete, the Allied forces had to retreat to the southern shores where they were picked up by Royal Navy ships under heavy German air attacks. On 1 June, the last Allied forces totalling 16,000 men had been evacuated from Crete. The Germans had lost 4,000 killed and 2,500 wounded taking Crete, which was more than all of their losses on the Greek mainland and Yugoslavia combined. About 16,000 Allied soldiers were killed or captured while the Royal Navy had lost three cruisers and six destroyers to German air and naval attacks during the evacuation while a battleship and an aircraft carrier had been badly damaged. The British Mediterranean fleet's losses off Crete meant that there was no immediate prospect of Britain regaining command of the central Mediterranean, and Egypt would still have to be supplied via the long route around Africa. The Germans had been outraged that the civilian population of Crete had joined in the defence as the idea of women fighting was considered offensive by the Nazis, and in the aftermath of the battle, the Fallschirmjäger massacred many Cretan civilians. In the aftermath of the Battle of Crete, Wavell was described as being very unhappy. Sir Miles Lampson, the British ambassador to Egypt, wrote on 29 May 1941 after a meeting with Wavell that he was "looking the picture of gloom". Lampson reported that Wavell's mood recovered as he joked that Churchill's "snappy, caustic telegrams" were useless as telegrams "didn't help him beat the Germans".

==== Iraq and Syrian campaigns ====
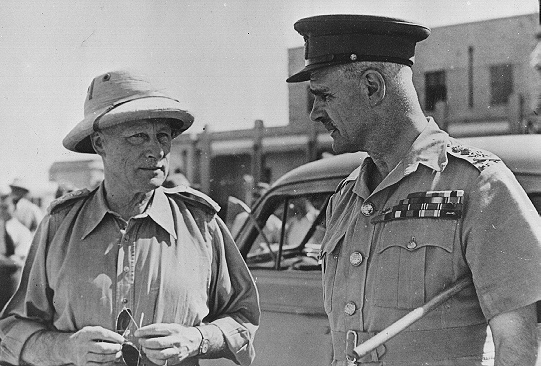
Wavell (right) meets Lt. General Edward Quinan, commander of British and Indian Army forces in Iraq in April 1941.

Events in Greece provoked an Iraqi pro-Axis faction to begin the 1941 Iraqi coup d'état. Wavell, hard pressed on his other fronts, was unwilling to divert resources to Iraq and so it fell to Claude Auchinleck's British Indian Army to send troops to Basra. Churchill saw Iraq as strategically vital and in early May, under heavy pressure from London, Wavell agreed to send a division-sized force across the desert from Palestine to relieve RAF Habbaniya and to assume control of troops in Iraq. Churchill nearly sacked Wavell on 6 May 1941 when he at first refused an order to march into Iraq. During the Iraq campaign, the Vichy premier Admiral François Darlan, gave the Germans transit rights to send their forces to Iraq across Syria. When he learned of this Churchill wanted to allow Free French forces to invade Syria at once, but Wavell advised that Free French forces were too small to invade Syria without British help. On 18 May 1941, General Georges Catroux met with Wavell in Cairo to urge him to invade Syria, claiming that Darlan had signed a secret agreement with Hitler for the Reich to occupy Syria and that Vichy forces were withdrawing into Lebanon as the prelude for the hand-over. Besides de Gaulle and Catroux, Major-General Edward Spears, with whom Churchill enjoyed warmer personal relations than de Gaulle, was also lobbying Wavell for an invasion of Syria.

By the end of May Edward Quinan's Iraqforce had captured Baghdad and the Anglo-Iraqi War had ended with the re-establishment of the pro-British ruler and troops in Iraq once more reverting to the overall control of Indian Army GHQ in Delhi. However, Churchill had been unimpressed by Wavell's reluctance to act. In book 3 of his memoirs/history of the war, The Grand Alliance, Churchill split the different campaigns in Iraq, Syria, Ethiopia, Egypt and Greece into different chapters, making Wavell's complaints about feeling overwhelmed seem petty and churlish. In fact at one point in May 1941, Wavell was conducting simultaneously campaigns in Iraq, the Horn of Africa, North Africa and Crete. Churchill had great hopes for Wavell's Operation Battleaxe planned for June to relieve Tobruk, and in May 1941 sent out a convoy codenamed Tiger to once again send tanks to Egypt via the shorter, but more dangerous Mediterranean route rather the long route around Cape of Good Hope.

In early June Wavell sent a force under General Wilson to invade Syria and Lebanon, responding to the help given by the Vichy France authorities there to the Iraq Government during the Anglo-Iraqi War. Initial hopes of a quick victory faded as the French put up a determined defence. For a time, it appeared that a stalemate was developing as the Anglo-Australian-Indian-Free French force that had invaded Syria seemed to be stuck before Damascus.

==== Removal from the Middle East command ====
Churchill determined to relieve Wavell and after the failure in mid June of Operation Battleaxe he told Wavell on 20 June that he was to be replaced by Auchinleck, whose attitude during the Iraq crisis had impressed him. The requirement that Wavell send forces barely recovered from the defeat on the Greek mainland and the bloody fighting on Crete into Syria and Iraq reduced size of the force that Wavell could commit to Operation Battleaxe, while British tank commanders failed to take into the account the devastating 8.8 cm anti-aircraft/anti-tank gun; most of the British tanks knocked out in Operation Battleaxe were destroyed not by German tanks, but by the "88" guns. German tactics were to lure British tanks into the range of the 88 guns, which was helped by British doctrine that tanks should serve in a "cruiser" role, independently in the desert away from supporting artillery, which might have knocked out the 88 guns. Churchill felt that because of the Ultra secret that Wavell must had been incompetent in conducting Operation Battleaxe, which led directly to his decision to sack him. Churchill could not mention Ultra in The Grand Alliance, but claimed that MI6 had a spy in the staff of the Afrika Korps, and that Wavell was amiss in not using the intelligence from the alleged spy better. The British historian David Reynolds wrote that Churchill "seems not to have understood" that the British had the advantage in strategic intelligence as they could read some of the German codes, but that the Germans had better tactical intelligence as the Afrika Korps made better maps and was more aggressive in patrolling the "no-man's land" between the Allied and Axis lines. The end of Operation Battleaxe released more British forces to be sent north to Syria and on 21 June 1941 Damascus fell, the same day that Auchinleck replaced Wavell. One of Wavell's last duties was to serve as the host for W. Averell Harriman, another of President Roosevelt's friends whom he had sent out on a diplomatic mission to the Middle East in late June 1941. Harriman described Wavell to Roosevelt as "a man of true integrity and a true leader".

Rommel rated Wavell highly, despite Wavell's lack of success against him. Of Wavell, Auchinleck wrote: "In no sense do I wish to infer that I found an unsatisfactory situation on my arrival – far from it. Not only was I greatly impressed by the solid foundations laid by my predecessor, but I was also able the better to appreciate the vastness of the problems with which he had been confronted and the greatness of his achievements, in a command in which some 40 different languages are spoken by the British and Allied Forces."

=== Commander-in-Chief, India ===
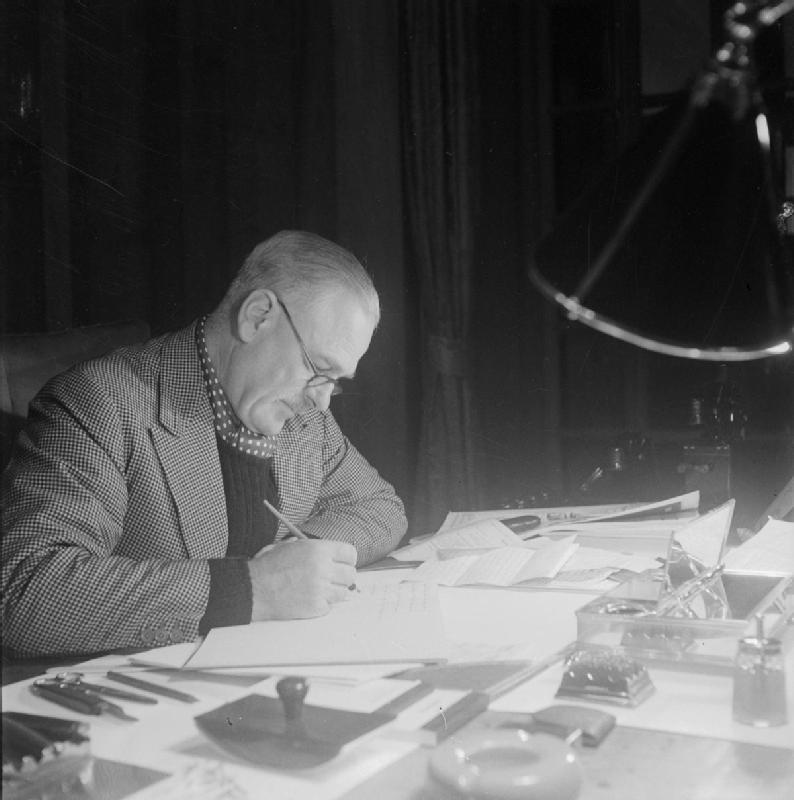
Wavell at his desk in Delhi during the Second World War

Wavell in effect swapped jobs with Auchinleck, transferring to India where he became Commander-in-Chief, India and a member of the Governor General's Executive Council. Initially his command covered India and Iraq so that within a month of taking charge he launched Iraqforce to invade Persia in co-operation with the Russians in order to secure the oilfields and the lines of communication to the Soviet Union. In the summer and fall of 1941, many British officials expected the Soviet Union to be defeated that year. Wavell's initial concern was that the Soviet Union would be defeated and that Germany would advance though the Caucasus to invade Iran, and from there invade India.

Wavell once again had the misfortune of being placed in charge of an undermanned theatre which became a war zone when the Japanese declared war on the United Kingdom in December 1941. On 22 December 1941, Wavell went to Chungking, the temporary capital of China, to see Chiang Kai-shek to discuss keeping the Burma Road open. While waiting for his flight to Chungking, Wavell met at Rangoon airport with Claire Lee Chennault and the other pilots of the American Volunteer Group, better known as the "Flying Tigers" who were also on their way to China. Chennault and the other "Flying Tigers" impressed Wavell as brave, determined, high-spirted adventurers, whom Wavell predicted would do well in China.

Wavell described his landing on an airport on a semi-flooded island in the Yangtze river as "rather hair-raising" and Chungking itself as an "unattractive" city that had been badly damaged by Japanese bombing. Wavell called Chiang "not a particularly impressive figure" who was only interested in grand strategy in Asia and had no interest in Burma despite the importance of the Burma Road in keeping China supplied with arms. Chiang did not speak English and his American educated wife Soong Mei-ling served as his translator. Wavell reported to London that he had the impression that Chiang was planning to steal the billions of American aid that he had been promised by Roosevelt. On the second day of the conference, Wavell accepted Chiang's offer of the 6th Chinese Army to help Burma, but refused the offer of the 5th Chinese Army on the grounds that it would be impossible to supply two Chinese armies at once. Wavell denied that his refusal of Chiang's offer of two Chinese armies was racially motivated, saying that moving two Chinese armies from Yunnan province into Burma would have increased his logistical problems immensely. His return flight to India was constantly stopped because of the heavy Japanese bombing of Chungking.

Wavell was made Commander-in-Chief of ABDACOM (American-British-Dutch-Australian Command). Besides a relentless advance down Malaya (modern Malaysia), the Japanese had landed in the northern islands of the Dutch East Indies (modern Indonesia). Late at night on 10 February 1942, Wavell prepared to board a flying boat to fly from Singapore to Java. He stepped out of a staff car, not noticing (because of his blind left eye) that it was parked at the edge of a pier. He broke two bones in his back when he fell, and this injury affected his temperament for some time. Wavell chose to focus on defending Java as the best way to defend Australia. On 23 February 1942, with Malaya lost and the Allied position in Java and Sumatra precarious, ABDACOM was closed down and its headquarters in Java evacuated. Wavell returned to India to resume his position as C-in-C India where his responsibilities now included the defence of Burma. On 27 February 1942, the Imperial Japanese Navy defeated an Anglo-Australian-American-Dutch fleet in the Battle of Java Sea, and on 12 March 1942 the Dutch governor of Java signed the instrument of surrender. After the fall of Singapore, Wavell commented to Alan Brooke, the new CIGS, that if only the defenders of Malaya had held out for a month longer, it would have been possible to defend Singapore along with the Dutch East Indies.

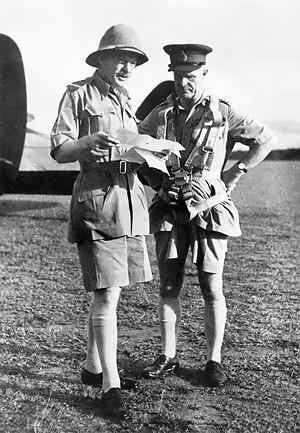
Wavell (right) with Brooke-Popham in WW II

On 23 February British forces in Burma had suffered a serious setback when Major-General Jackie Smyth's decision to destroy the bridge over the Sittang river to prevent the enemy crossing had resulted in most of his division being trapped on the wrong side of the river. The Viceroy of India Lord Linlithgow sent a signal criticising the conduct of the field commanders to Churchill who forwarded it to Wavell together with an offer to send Harold Alexander, who had commanded the rearguard at Dunkirk. Alexander took command of Allied land forces in Burma in early March with William Slim arriving shortly afterwards from commanding a division in Iraq to take command of its principal formation, Burma Corps. Nevertheless, the pressure from the Japanese Armies was unstoppable and a withdrawal to India was ordered which was completed by the end of May before the start of the monsoon season which brought Japanese progress to a halt. On 8 March 1942, the Japanese took Rangoon. The Japanese advance into southeast Asia along with the bombing of Darwin and a Japanese submarine attack in Sydney Harbour led to considerable public Australian alarm in early 1942 and insistent demands by the Australian prime minister John Curtin that the Allies hold the Dutch East Indies to stop the expected Japanese invasion of Australia. The Allies rushed reinforcements to the Dutch East Indies instead of Burma. In particular, two of the three Australian divisions fighting in the Middle East that were supposed to be redeployed to Burma were sent instead sent back to Australia as Curtin argued as the Australian prime minister that the defence of Australia took precedence over the defence of Egypt or India.

Wavell also had to deal with General Joseph Stilwell, who had been appointed by Chiang to take command of the Chinese armies driven into India by the Japanese conquest of Burma. Wavell first met Stilwell in Calcutta on 28 February 1942, and had difficult relations with the notoriously abrasive and Anglophobic Stilwell. Stilwell described Wavell in his diary as "a tired, depressed man pretty well beaten down". Wavell charged that Stillwell was a generally difficult subordinate who had no staff to speak of as Stilwell tried to serve as a one-man general staff for the Chinese. Stillwell had a very specific mission, namely to reopen the Burma Road so that American aid could reach China, which caused conflicts with Wavell had a number of other responsibilities besides for reopening the Burma Road. The fact that Stilwell feuded endlessly with Chiang, whom he called "the Peanut" caused problems for Wavell as it was never entirely clear just how much control Stilwell actually exercised over the Chinese armies under his command.

Wavell was strongly critical of Churchill's decision to give priority to the strategic bombing offensive against Germany, which he complained left his command deprived of the aircraft needed to defend India. In April 1942, he wrote to Churchill after the Japanese Indian Ocean raid: "It certainly gives us furiously to think when, after trying with less than twenty light bombers to meet an attack, which has cost us three important warships and several others and nearly 100,000 tons of shipping, we see that over 200 heavy bombers attacked one town in Germany". By definition, Wavell's role in India required him to put the security interests of India first, which put him at odds with the "Germany First" grand strategy. In April 1942, Wavell complained that there the 7 elite divisions of the Indian Army were fighting in Libya and Egypt while he had only 3 lesser quality Indian divisions to defend India against the expected Japanese invasion. Wavell also charged that it was not possible to raise more divisions in India owing to a lack of equipment. In addition, the "Quit India" protests launched in August 1942 overwhelmed the police forces, and Wavell was forced to send out Indian Army troops as an aid to civil power in several provinces to uphold the authority of the Raj.

In order to wrest some of the initiative from the Japanese, Wavell ordered the Eastern Army in India to mount an offensive in the Arakan, starting in September 1942. After some initial success the Japanese counter-attacked, and by March 1943 the position was untenable, and the remnants of the attacking force were withdrawn. Wavell relieved the Eastern Army commander, Noel Irwin, of his command and replaced him with George Giffard. In 1942, Wavell brought Orde Wingate to India to launch the first Chindit raid into Burma, which began on 8 February 1943. The Chindit raid, through militarily inconclusive, lifted morale as the exploits of a commando unit operating in the jungle beyond Japanese lines attracted much media attention.

In January 1943, Wavell was promoted to field marshal and on 22 April he returned to London. On 4 May he had an audience with the King, before departing with Churchill for America (for the Trident Conference), returning on 27 May. He resided with Henry 'Chips' Channon MP in Belgrave Square and was reintroduced by him into London society. Churchill nursed "an uncontrollable and unfortunate disapproval – indeed jealous dislike – of Wavell", and had several spats with him in America.

== Viceroy of India ==
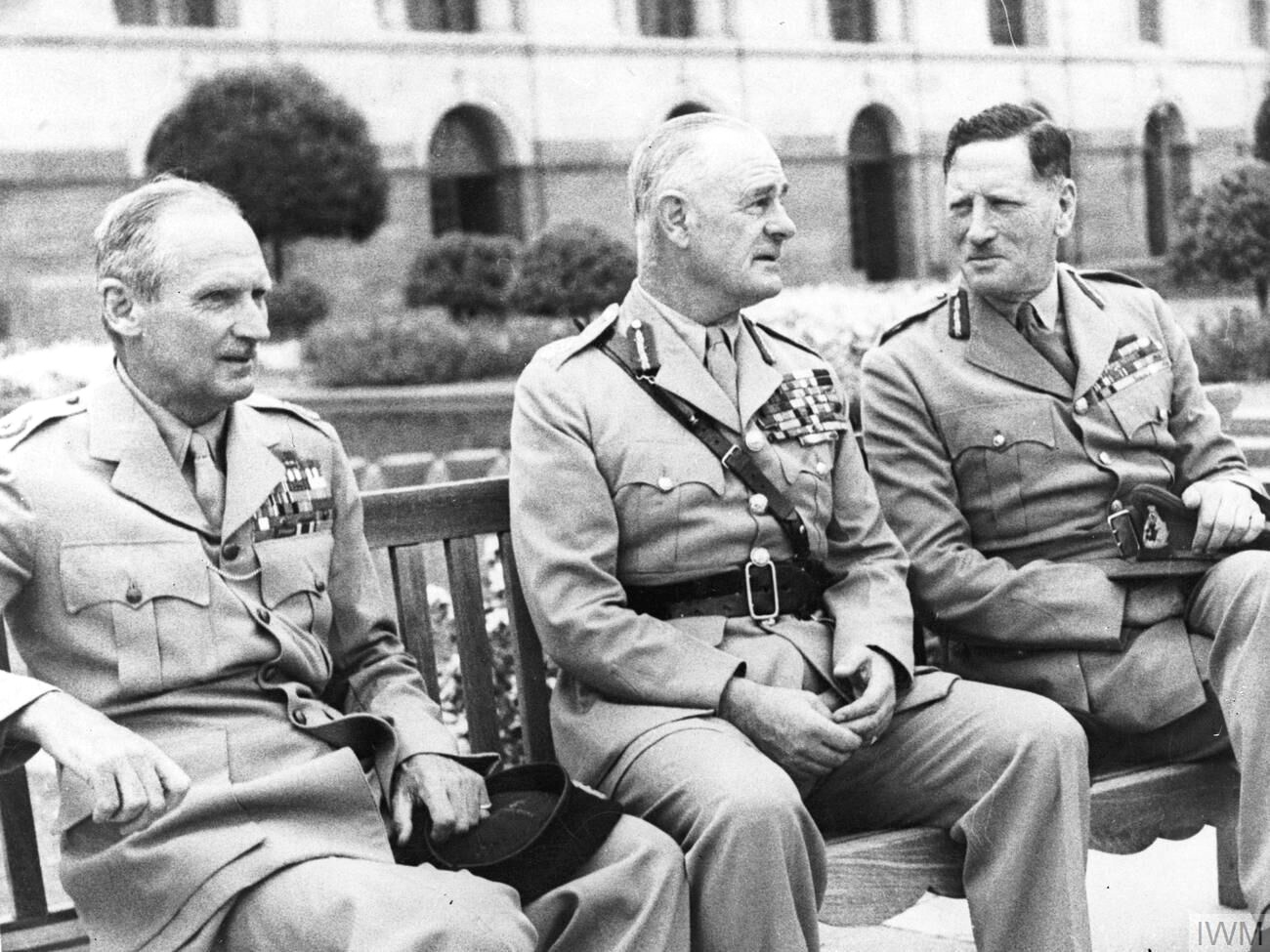
Wavell as Viceroy of India (centre), with the C-in-C of the Indian Army Auchinleck (right) and Montgomery.

On 15 June 1943, Churchill invited Wavell to dinner and offered him the Viceroyalty of India in succession to Linlithgow. Lady Wavell joined him in London on 14 July, when they took up a suite at The Dorchester. Shortly afterwards it was announced that he had been created a viscount (taking the style Viscount Wavell of Cyrenaica and of Winchester, in the county of Southampton) When the post of Supreme Command for the Allied Forces in Asia was created in 1943, Wavell was the obvious choice for the role, but Churchill wanted to give that post to Admiral Louis Mountbatten instead. Churchill tried to appoint Wavell as the Governor-General of Australia, and when that gambit fell through, appointed Wavell to be Viceroy of India. Wavell addressed an all-party meeting at the House of Commons on 27 July, and on 28 July took his seat in the House of Lords as "the Empire's hero". In September he was formally named Governor-General and Viceroy of India.

Churchill had expected Wavell to be a hardline conservative who would fight against Indian independence, and proved disappointed when Wavell proved more open than expected to negotiating with the Indian politicians. Wavell proved to be more of a diplomat who negotiated with the Indians in order to secure Indian support for the war effort than a soldier who would repress the Indian independence movement. Shortly after taking up the office of Viceroy in October 1943, Wavell told Leo Amery, the Secretary of State for India, that Churchill should calm down the situation by promising in a speech that India would have Dominion status after the war as a reward for wartime sacrifices. Amery told Wavell that Churchill would not like that advice and would reject it as he indeed did. Wavell pressed the point, arguing that most Indians were willing to support the British war effort as they preferred British rule to Japanese rule, but were not willing to accept the status quo of being a British colony forever and that the best way to secure Indian support for the war was to promise Dominion status. This was a volte-face on Wavell's part as he had criticised the Labour politician Stafford Cripps for making essentially the same offer in 1942. Wavell planned to call a secret conference to be attended by all of the leading Indian politicians such as Mahatma Gandhi and Jawaharlal Nehru of the Congress Party and Mohammad Ali Jinnah of the Muslim League. At the conference, Wavell planned to give a definitive promise of Dominion status for India after the war in exchange for Indian support for the war and the end of protests against the Raj. On 8 October 1943, Wavell had his last meeting with Churchill who told him in no uncertain terms of his opposition to Wavell's plans for Dominion status for India, saying it was a betrayal of all he believed in and would split the Conservative Party. When Wavell arrived at the Viceroy's House in New Delhi on 19 October 1943, his predecessor, Lord Linlithgow, cynically told him "the chief factors of the problem of Indian political progress were the stupidity of the Indian and the dishonesty of the British: we should not be able to get away with it much longer". Linlithgow also told Wavell that he expected that "deaths in Bengal might be up to 1,000,000 or 1,500,000 and that we looked like getting off better than we had thought possible".

One of Wavell's first actions in office was to address the Bengal famine of 1943 by ordering the army to distribute relief supplies to the starving rural Bengalis. He attempted with mixed success to increase the supplies of rice to reduce the prices. Wavell asked the cabinet to allow an extra one and a half million tons of food to be imported into India to address the famine, which was refused on the grounds that it would mean the loss of two million tons of food imports into United Kingdom. During his reign, Gandhi was leading the Quit India campaign, Mohammad Ali Jinnah was working for an independent state for the Muslims and Subhas Chandra Bose befriended Japan "and were pressing forward along India's Eastern border". Wavell disliked Gandhi, whom he called "malevolent" and "malignant" in a letter to King George VI after meeting him. Wavell wrote that attempting to speak to Gandhi was like a conversation between "a rabbit faced by a stoat". Likewise, he disapproved of Jinnah whom he called "a lonely, unhappy, self-centred man". In much the same way that Wavell's quiet, laconic nature had angered the loquacious Churchill, Wavell's reserved character did not mesh well with the equally talkative Indian politicians. Over Churchill's opposition Wavell tried to appoint more Indians to senior civil service posts as a way to garner Indian support for the war. In an order to Governors of the provinces placed under direct British rule following the Quit India protests, Wavell charged that the popular picture in India of British indifference to India's problems, especially the Bengal famine, was damaging the Raj. Wavell wrote: "British opinion was, I believe, shaken by the apparent apathy of the people of Malaya and Burma to the Japanese invasion. British administrators had, it seemed, failed to inspire affection for the British connection, or even contentment, in those countries. The journalistic spotlight was rapidly shifted to India, where it was easy to discover poverty, ignorance, disease and dirt on a gigantic scale". Wavell argued that newspapers needed to print more stories about progress in India under the Raj such as irrigation, railroads and public works which had improved the lives of ordinary Indians as a way to secure Indian support for the war effort. Wavell's efforts to feed the starving people in the Bengal province won him "respect and admiration. Here, it was said, is a down-to-earth soldier grasping the reins of power, but with a heart that cares for Mother India".

Although Wavell was initially popular with Indian politicians, pressure mounted concerning the likely structure and timing of an independent India. He attempted to move the debate along, with the Wavell Plan and the Simla Conference, but received little support from Churchill (who was against Indian independence), nor from Clement Attlee, Churchill's successor as prime minister. He was also hampered by the differences between the various Indian political factions. In 1944, tensions were increased when the Japanese finally invaded India. The Japanese invasion was decisively defeated at the Battle of Imphal and the Battle of Kohima by the Fourteenth Army under the command of Slim. The ending of the Japanese threat to India weakened Wavell's argument for Dominion status as Churchill took the fact that the majority of the men of the 14th Army were Indian as evidence that the majority of Indians supported the Raj. In 1944, the publication of Wavell's poetry collection, Other Men's Flowers caused a sensation with the public being much taken with the idea of a soldier who also a poet. At the end of the war, rising Indian expectations continued to be unfulfilled, and inter-communal violence increased.

In May 1944, Wavell released Gandhi from prison rather than run the risk of him dying of coronary thrombosis, which he believed would cause massive riots all over India should the Mahatma die in British custody. In a cable to Wavell, Churchill ordered him not to negotiate with Gandhi over anything as Churchill called Gandhi "a thoroughly evil force, hostile to us in every fibre, largely in the hands of native vested interests". In early August 1944, Gandhi told Wavell he was willing to end the Quit India protests in exchange for an immediate granting of Dominion status for India. Wavell rejected the offer, but made a counter-offer of a transitional government to be formed immediately that would last until the Axis powers were defeated, after which India would have Dominion status. Wavell suggested that India "a provisional political government, of the type suggested in the Cripps declaration within the present constitution, coupled with an earnest, but necessarily simultaneous attempt to devise a constitutional settlement". Wavell suggested as a first attempt that members of both the Congress Party and the Muslim League be allowed to serve on the Viceroy's Executive Council. Churchill exploded in rage at a cabinet meeting as he stated that Wavell should not be talking to "a traitor who ought to be put back into prison" and stated that he wished he had never appointed Wavell as Viceroy. On 4 August 1944, Churchill drafted a counter-offer for Wavell to make to Gandhi, which was concerned with the status of untouchables in Indian society, which Churchill intended as a wedge issue to break apart Indian support for the Congress Party. When Amery pointed out to Churchill that the issue of untouchables was irrelevant to the question of the political status of India, Churchill replied that he intended to carry out a "regeneration" of India by "extinguishing" Indian landlords and industrialists and that "It might be necessary to get rid of wretched sentimentalists like Wavell and most of the present English officials in India who are more Indian than the Indians, and send out new men". In a memo written by Amery that was a satire of Churchill's views on 4 August 1944 entitled The Regeneration of India: A Memo by the Prime Minister, Amery posing as Churchill wrote he had no intention of honouring the promise made by Cripps in 1942 of Dominion status for India, which he described as "...an open invitation to the Indians to unite and kick us out of India", which he only made because of the threat of a Japanese invasion of India. In the same memo, Amery posing as Churchill attacked Wavell as a Viceroy who: "...would not only appear to have taken our pledges seriously, but to have been imbued with a miserable sneaking sympathy for what are called Indian aspirations, not to speak of an inveterate and scandalous propensity to defend Indian interests against those of their own country and a readiness to see British workers sweat and toil for generations to swell even further the distended paunches of Hindu money-lenders". The memo was satirical, but the views of Wavell that Amery credited to Churchill in the memo did reflect the prime minister's point of view.

A number of prisoners taken by the British in Burma belonged to the collaborationists Indian National Army led by Bose. As the Indian National Army was recruited by the Japanese from POWs from the Indian Army captured in the campaigns in Hong Kong, Malaya, Singapore and Burma, Wavell pressed for the INA POWs to be tried for treason. Wavell described the death of Bose in a plane crash on 19 August 1945 as a "great relief" as bringing Bose to trial would likely had caused riots in India. Wavell expressed concern over the way that once the war was over, the Congress Party tried to appropriate the legacy of the INA as its own, and even more concerningly made appeals to the Indian Army to sever its loyalty to the Raj. The trial of the INA POWs in 1945–1946 at the Red Fort of Delhi led to massive demonstrations in favour of the accused with Indian newspapers depicting the INA as patriots who had fought against the Raj. Gandhi and Nehru rather cynically sought to link the Congress Party with the INA during the Red Fort trials as Wavell reported to London that the Red Fort trials were being used as a "weapon" against the Raj. In February 1946 the sailors of the Royal Indian Navy mutinied, forcing Wavell to concentrate forces in Bombay to deal with the situation. With the end of the war, Jinnah started what he called the "direct action" campaign to press for a Muslim state to be carved out of India to be called Pakistan. On 16 August 1946 Muslim League "direct action" demonstrations led to bloody rioting in Calcutta between the Hindu and Muslim communities, for which Wavell was blamed in London. After the Calcutta riot, the Governor of Bengal province reported to Wavell that the authority of the Raj was rapidly breaking down as Indian civil servants were resigning in greater numbers and the police force of Bengal was an "ill-disciplined rabble" torn apart by sectarian hatreds between Hindus and Muslims. Wavell advised London that given that the way that Indian public opinion was hostile towards any continuation of the Raj after the war the best that could be done was the so-called Breakdown Plan under which the British would withdraw in stages with India achieving independence on 31 March 1948. Eventually, in 1947, Attlee lost confidence in Wavell and replaced him with Lord Mountbatten of Burma.

== Later life ==
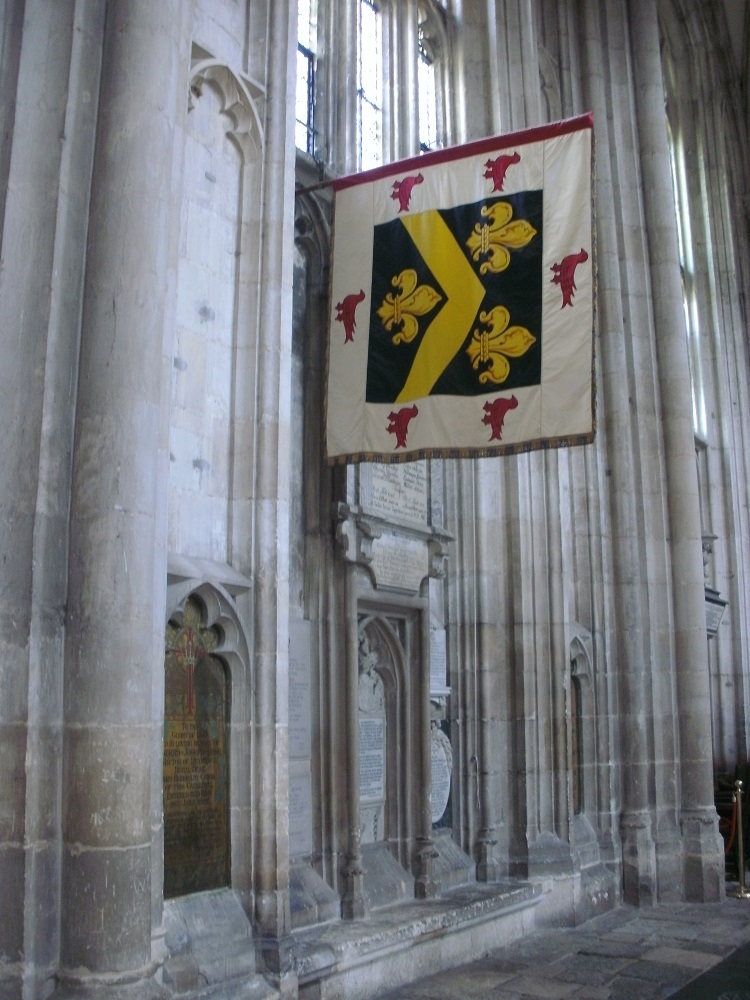
Field Marshal Lord Wavell's banner as Knight Grand Cross of the Order of the Bath, now displayed in Winchester Cathedral

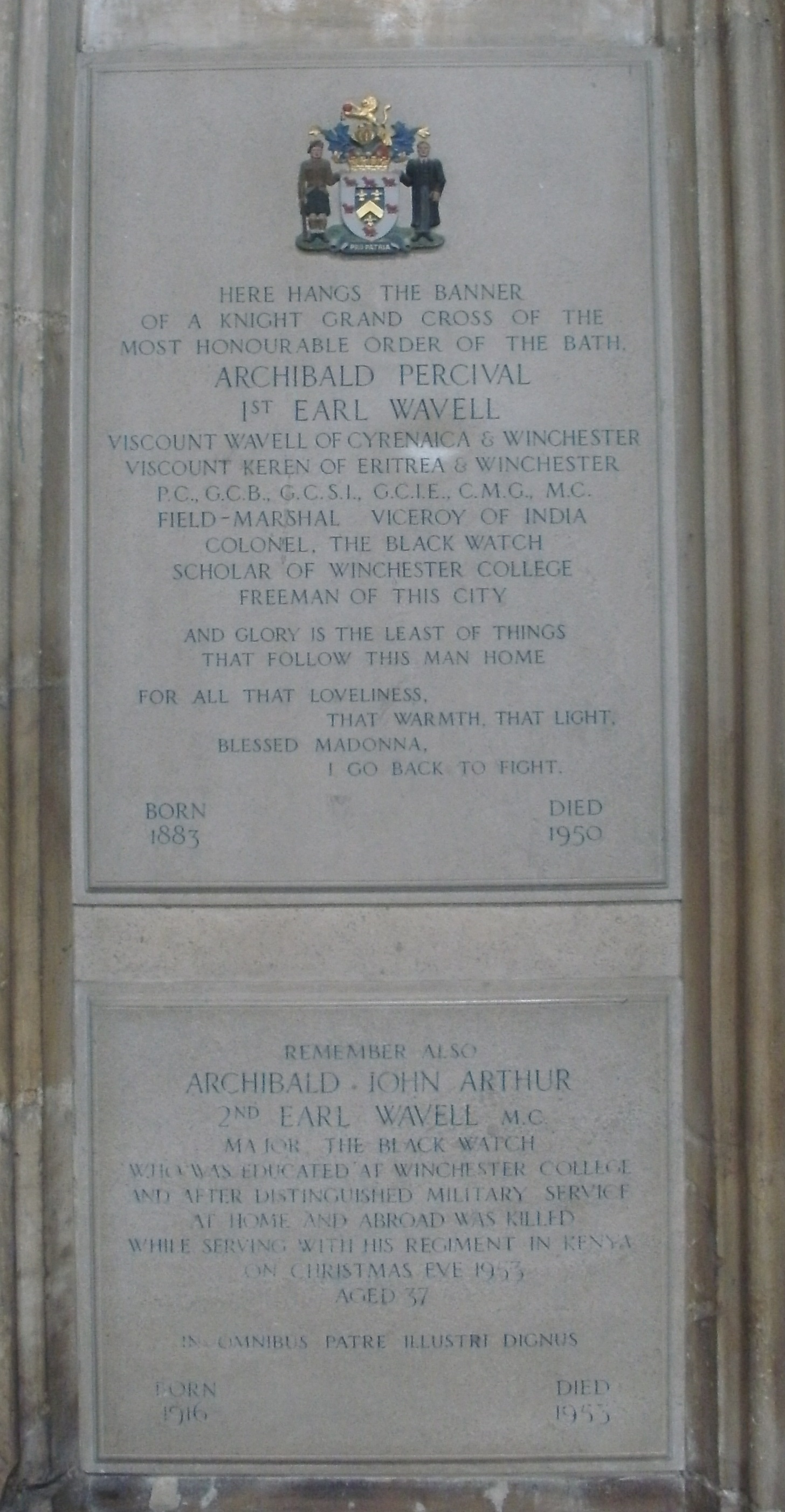
Memorial plaques for Field Marshal 1st Earl Wavell (died 1950) and his son, the 2nd Earl Wavell (died 1953), in Winchester Cathedral

In 1947 Wavell returned to England and was made High Steward of Colchester. The same year, he was created Earl Wavell and given the additional title of Viscount Keren of Eritrea and Winchester.

Wavell was a great lover of literature, and while Viceroy of India he compiled and annotated an anthology of great poetry, Other Men's Flowers, which was published in 1944. He wrote the last poem in the anthology himself and described it as a "...little wayside dandelion of my own". He had a great memory for poetry and often quoted it at length. He is depicted in Evelyn Waugh's novel Officers and Gentlemen, part of the Sword of Honour trilogy, reciting a translation of Callimachus' poetry in public. He was also a member of the Church of England and a deeply religious man.

Wavell died on 24 May 1950 after a relapse following abdominal surgery on 5 May. After his death, his body lay in state at the Tower of London where he had been Constable. A military funeral was held on 7 June 1950 with the funeral procession travelling along the Thames from the Tower to Westminster Pier and then to Westminster Abbey for the funeral service. This was the first military funeral by river since that of Horatio Nelson, 1st Viscount Nelson, in 1806. The funeral was attended by the then Prime Minister Clement Attlee as well as Lord Halifax and fellow officers including Field Marshals Alanbrooke and Montgomery. Winston Churchill did not attend the service.

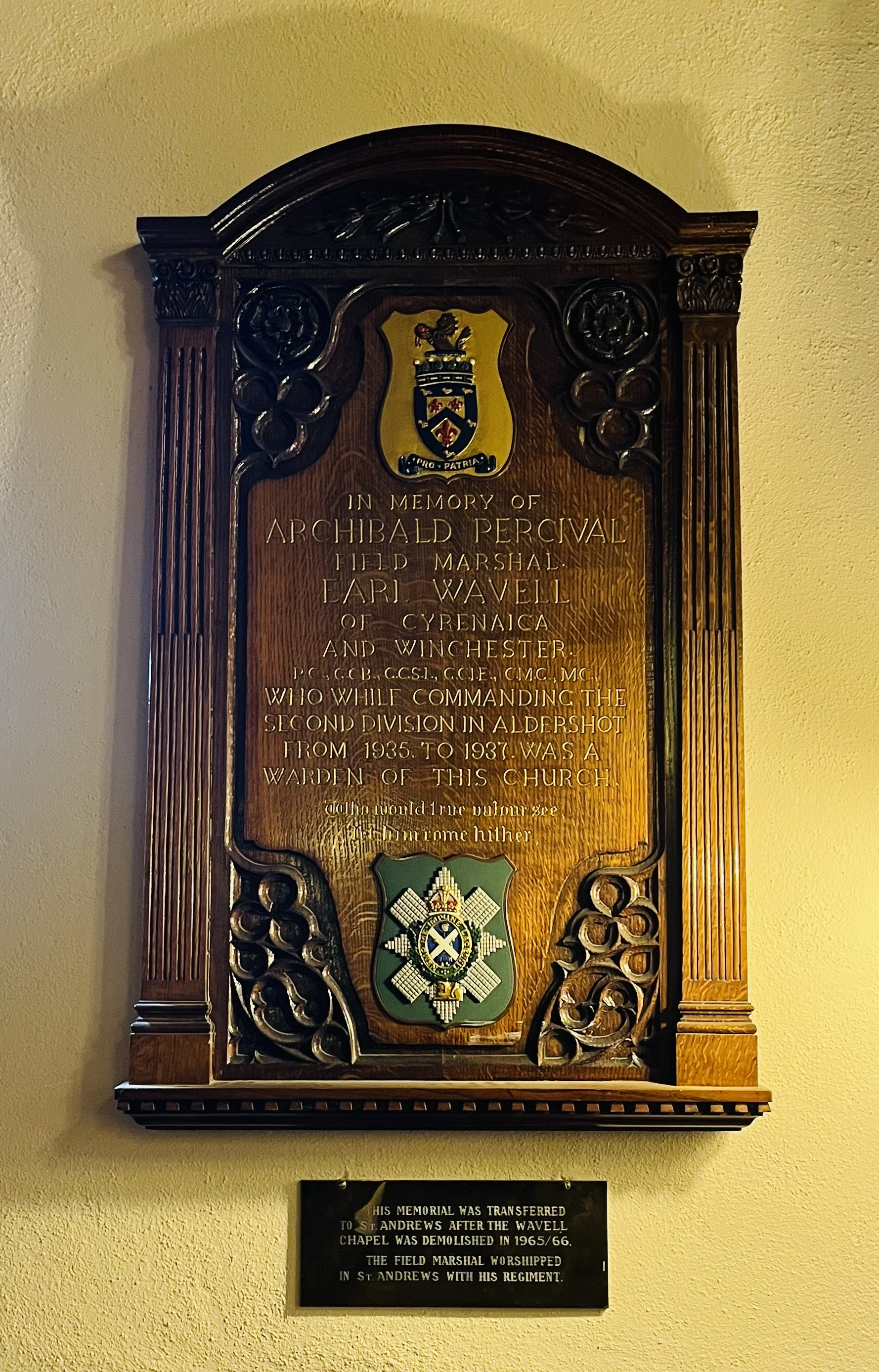
Monument in St Andrew's Garrison Church, Aldershot

Wavell is buried in the old mediaeval cloister at Winchester College, next to the Chantry Chapel. His tombstone simply bears the inscription "Wavell". A plaque was placed in the north nave aisle of Winchester Cathedral to commemorate both Wavell and his son. St Andrew's Garrison Church, Aldershot, an Army church, contains a large wooden plaque dedicated to Lord Wavell.

== Family ==
Wavell married Eugenie Marie Quirk, only daughter of Col. J. O. Quirk CB DSO, on 22 April 1915. She died, as the Countess Wavell, on 11 October 1987, aged 100 years.

Children:

- Archibald John Arthur Wavell, later 2nd Earl Wavell, b. 11 May 1916; d. 24 December 1953, killed in Kenya, in an action against Mau Mau rebels. Since he was unmarried and without issue, the titles became extinct on his death.
- Eugenie Pamela Wavell, b. 2 December 1918, married 14 March 1942 Lt.-Col. A. F. W. Humphrys MBE.
- Felicity Ann Wavell, b. 21 July 1921, married at the Cathedral Church of the Redemption, New Delhi, 20 February 1947 Capt. P. M. Longmore MC, son of Air Chief Marshal Sir Arthur Longmore.
- Joan Patricia Quirk Wavell, b. 23 April 1923, married

- (1) 27 January 1943 Maj. Hon. Simon Nevill Astley (b. 13 August 1919; d. 16 March 1946), 2nd son of Albert Edward Delaval [Astley], 21st Baron Hastings, by his wife Lady Margueritte Helen Nevill, only child by his second wife of Henry Gilbert Ralph [Nevill], 3rd Marquess of Abergavenny.
- (2) 19 June 1948 Maj. Harry Alexander Gordon MC (d. 19 June 1965), 2nd son of Cdr. Alastair Gordon DSO RN.
- (3) Maj. Donald Struan Robertson (d. 1991), son of the Rt. Hon. Sir Malcolm Arnold Robertson GCMG KBE.

== Honours, awards and arms ==
Ribbon bar (as it would look today)

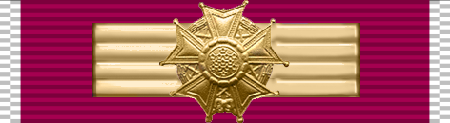

=== British ===
- Military Cross – 3 June 1915
- Mention in Despatches 22 June 1915, 4 January 1917, 22 January 1919
- Companion of the Order of St Michael and St George (CMG) – 1 January 1919
- Knight Grand Cross of the Order of the Bath (GCB) – 4 March 1941 (KCB: 2 January 1939; CB: 1 January 1935)
- Knight Grand Commander of the Order of the Star of India (GCSI) – 18 September 1943
- Knight Grand Commander of the Order of the Indian Empire (GCIE) – 18 September 1943
- Knight of the Order of St. John – 4 January 1944

=== Others ===
- Order of St Stanislaus, 3rd class with Swords (Russia) (12 September 1916)
- Order of St. Vladimir (Russia) 1917
- Croix de Guerre (Commandeur) (France) – 4 May 1920
- Commandeur, Légion d'honneur (France) – 7 May 1920
- Order of El Nahda, 2nd Class (Hejaz) – 30 September 1920
- Grand Cross, Order of George I with Swords (Greece) – 9 May 1941
- Virtuti Militari, 5th Class (Poland) – 23 September 1941
- War Cross, 1st Class (Greece) – 10 April 1942
- Commander, Order of the Seal of Solomon (Ethiopia) – 5 May 1942
- Grand Cross, Order of Orange-Nassau (Netherlands) – 15 January 1943
- War Cross (Czechoslovakia) – 23 July 1943
- Legion of Merit degree of Chief Commander (United States) – 23 July 1948

=== Arms ===
Coat of arms of Archibald Wavell, 1st Earl Wavell
Coronet A Coronet of an Earl Crest "Demi-Lion holding between the paws a Human Heart vulned proper." Escutcheon "Azure, a Chevron between three Fleurs-de-lis Or a Bordure Argent charged with six Martlets Gules." Supporters "Dexter, a soldier of the Black Watch in field service uniform supporting with his exterior hand a Rifle; sinister, Scholar of Winchester College in his gown holding in his exterior hand a Closed Book, all proper." Motto Pro patria

== Publications ==
=== Books ===
- Tsar Nicholas II by Andrei Georgievich Elchaninov. Translated from the Russian by Archibald Percival Wavell. Hugh Rees. 1913.
- The Tsar and his People by Andrei Georgievich Elchaninov. Translated from the Russian by Archibald P. Wavell. Hugh Rees. 1914.
- The Palestine Campaigns. London: Constable. 1933. OCLC 221723716.
- Allenby, A Study in Greatness: The Biography of Field-Marshal Viscount Allenby of Megiddo and Felixstowe, G.C.B., G.C.M.G. London: Harrap. 1940–1943. OCLC 224016319.
- Generals and Generalship: The Lees Knowles Lectures Delivered at Trinity College, Cambridge in 1939. London: Times Pub. Co. 1941. OCLC 5176549.
- Soldiers and Soldiering or Epithets of War. London: J. Cape. 1953. OCLC 123277730.
- Other Men's Flowers: An Anthology of Poetry. London: J. Cape. 1977 [1944]. OCLC 10681637.
- Other Men's Flowers: An Anthology of Poetry (Memorial ed.). London: Pimlico. 1992 [1952].; "this first paperback edition contains not only Lord Wavell's own introduction and annotations, but also the introduction written by his son, to whom the book was originally dedicated".
- Allenby, Soldier and Statesman. London: White Lion. 1974 [1946]. ISBN 0-85617-408-4.
- Speaking Generally: broadcasts, Orders and Addresses in time of war (1939–43). London: Macmillan. 1946. OCLC 2172221.
- The Good Soldier. London: Macmillan. 1948. OCLC 6834669.
- Wavell: The Viceroy's Journal. London: Oxford University Press. 1973. ISBN 0-19-211723-8.

Official despatches

- "Operations In The Western Desert from December 7th, 1940 to February 7th, 1942", sent to Secretary of State for War June 1941 and published in "No. 37628". The London Gazette (Supplement). 25 June 1946. pp. 3261–3269.
- "Operations in The Middle East from 7th February 1941 to 15th July 1941", submitted 5 September 1941 published in "No. 37638". The London Gazette (Supplement). 2 July 1946. pp. 3423–3444.
- "Operations In Iraq, East Syria and Iran from 10th April 1941 to 12th January 1942" published in "No. 37685". The London Gazette (Supplement). 13 August 1946. pp. 4093–4101.
- "Operations in Eastern Theatre, Based on India, From March 1942 to December 31, 1942" published in "No. 37728". The London Gazette (Supplement). 17 September 1946. pp. 4663–4671.

== See also ==
- The Wavell School

== General sources ==
- Allen, Louis (1984). Burma: The Longest War. J. M. Dent and Sons. ISBN 0-460-02474-4.
- Auchinleck, Claude (1946). Despatch on Operations in the Middle East from 5 July 1941 to 31 October 1941. London: War Office. "No. 37695". The London Gazette (Supplement). 20 August 1946. pp. 4215–4230.
- Axelrod, Alan (2008). The Real History of World War II. Sterling Publishing. ISBN 978-1-4027-4090-9.
- Channon, Henry (1987). Rhodes James, R. (ed.). Chips: The Diaries of Sir Henry Channon. London: Weidenfeld and Nicolson.
- Close, H. M. (1997). Attlee, Wavell, Mountbatten, and the Transfer of Power. National Book Foundation.
- Connell, John (1 January 1964). Wavell: Scholar and Soldier. Collins.
- Connell, John (1 April 1969). Wavell, Supreme Commander. Collins. ISBN 978-0002119207.
- Diamond, Jon (2012). Archibald Wavell. London: Bloomsbury Publishing. ISBN 9781849087384.
- Fort, Adrian (2009). Wavell The Life and Times of An Imperial Servant. London: Jonathan Cape. ISBN 9780224076784.
- Frame, Alex (2008). Flying Boats: My Father's War in the Mediterranean. Victoria University Press. ISBN 978-0864735621.
- Freudenberg, Graham (2008). Churchill and Australia. Sydney: Pan Macmillan Australia. ISBN 9781742623672.
- Heathcote, Tony (1999). The British Field Marshals 1736–1997. Barnsley: Pen & Sword. ISBN 0-85052-696-5.
- Glynn, Irial (2007). "An Untouchable in the Presence of Brahmins: Lord Wavell's Disastrous Relationship with Whitehall During His Time as Viceroy to India, 1943–7". Modern Asian Studies. 41 (3): 639–663. doi:10.1017/S0026749X06002460. S2CID 143934881.
- Higham, Robin (2014). Diary of a Disaster British Aid to Greece, 1940–1941. Lexington: University Press of Kentucky. ISBN 9780813150505.
- Hughes, Matthew (2019). Britain's Pacification of Palestine The British Army, the Colonial State, and the Arab Revolt, 1936–1939. Cambridge: Cambridge University Press. ISBN 9781107103207.
- Houterman, Hans; Koppes, Jeroen. "World War II Unit Histories and Officers". Archived from the original on 3 December 2008.
- Kuracina, William (July 2010). "Sentiments and Patriotism: The Indian National Army, General Elections and the Congress's Appropriation of the INA Legacy". Modern Asian Studies. 44 (4): 817–856. doi:10.1017/S0026749X09990291.
- Lewin, Ronald (1980). The Chief Field Marshal Lord Wavell Commander-in-Chief and Viceroy 1939–1947. New York: Farrar, Straus & Giroux.
- Mead, Richard (2007). Churchill's Lions: A Biographical guide to the Key British Generals of World War II. Stroud: Spellmount. ISBN 978-1-86227-431-0.
- Pagden, Anthony (2008). Worlds at War: The 2,500-year Struggle between East and West. Oxford University Press US. ISBN 978-0-19-923743-2.
- Playfair, Major-General I. S. O.; with Flynn, Captain F. C. (RN); Molony, Brigadier C. J. C. & Gleave, Group Captain T. P. (2009) [1st. pub. HMSO: 1954]. Butler, Sir James (ed.). The Mediterranean and Middle East: The Early Successes Against Italy, to May 1941. History of the Second World War, United Kingdom Military Series. Vol. I. Uckfield, UK: Naval & Military Press. ISBN 978-1-84574-065-8.
- Murray, Williamson; Millett, Allan Reed (2000). "Diversions in the Mediterranean and Balkans". A War to Be Won: Fighting the Second World War. Cambridge: Harvard University Press. ISBN 978-0-674-00680-5.
- Raugh, Harold E. Jr. (2013). Wavell in the Middle East, 1939–1941: A Study in Generalship. University of Oklahoma Press. ISBN 978-0806143057.
- Reynolds, David (2004). In Command of History: Churchill Fighting and Writing the Second World War. London: Allen Lane.
- Roy, Kaushik (Autumn 2010). "Expansion and Deployment of the Indian Army During World War Two". Journal of the Society for Army Historical Research. 88 (355): 248–268.
- Mukerjee, Madusree (7 August 2010). "Winston Churchill's Plan for Post-war India Madhusree Mukerjee". Economic and Political Weekly. 45 (32): 27–30.
- Schofield, Victoria (2006). Wavell: Soldier and Statesman. London: John Murray. ISBN 978-0-71956-320-1. Review published in the London Review of Books Vol. 28, No. 19, dated 5 October 2006.
- Talbot, I.A. (April 1984). "Mountbatten and the Partition of India: A Rejoinder". History. 69 (225): 29–35. doi:10.1111/j.1468-229X.1984.tb01413.x.
- Wavell, Archibald Percival Wavell (1973). Wavell: The Viceroy's Journal. Oxford University Press. ISBN 978-0192117236.
- Weinberg, Gerhard (2004). A World In Arms A Global History of World War Two. Cambridge: Cambridge University Press. ISBN 0-521-85316-8.

Military offices
Preceded by Richard Oldman	Commander, 6th Infantry Brigade; 1930–1934	Succeeded by Henry Maitland Wilson
Preceded by Henry Jackson	GOC 2nd Division; 1935–1937	Succeeded by Henry Maitland Wilson
Preceded by Sir John Dill	GOC British Forces in Palestine and Trans-Jordan; 1937–1938	Succeeded by Robert Haining
Preceded by Sir John Burnett-Stuart	GOC-in-C Southern Command; 1938–1939	Succeeded by Sir Alan Brooke
New title	C-in-C Middle East Command; 1939–1941	Succeeded by Sir Claude Auchinleck
Preceded by Sir Claude Auchinleck	C-in-C India; 1941–1942	Succeeded by Sir Alan Hartley
Preceded by Sir Alan Hartley	C-in-C India; 1942–1943	Succeeded by Sir Claude Auchinleck
Government offices
Preceded by The Marquess of Linlithgow	Viceroy of India; 1943–1947	Succeeded by The Viscount Mountbatten of Burma
Honorary titles
Preceded by Lord Chetwode	Constable of the Tower of London; 1948–1950	Succeeded by The Viscount Alanbrooke
Preceded by The Duke of Wellington	Lord Lieutenant of the County of London; 1949–1950	Succeeded by The Viscount Alanbrooke
Peerage of the United Kingdom
New creation	Earl Wavell; 1947–1950	Succeeded by Archibald Wavell
New creation	Viscount Wavell; 1943–1950	Succeeded by Archibald Wavell
Academic offices
Preceded by The Lord Meston	Chancellor of the University of Aberdeen; 1945–1950	Succeeded by Thomas Johnston
