= Cambridge OCR =

British examination board

- Formation: 1998
- Merger of: UCLES and part of RSA
- Headquarters: Cambridge, England
- Region served: England, Wales and Northern Ireland
- Services: Examination board
- Managing Director: Myles McGinley
- Parent organization: Cambridge University Press & Assessment
- Website: ocr.org.uk
- Formerly called: Oxford Cambridge and RSA Examinations (1998-2025)

Cambridge OCR (formerly Oxford Cambridge and RSA Examinations or OCR) is an examination board which sets examinations and awards qualifications (including GCSEs, A-levels and vocational qualifications). It is one of England, Wales and Northern Ireland's five main examination boards.

Cambridge OCR is based in Cambridge, with an office in Coventry. It is part of the University of Cambridge's Cambridge University Press & Assessment. Cambridge OCR delivers GCSE, A-Level and vocational examinations and assessments in the United Kingdom whereas for other countries Cambridge University Press & Assessment operates the examination board Cambridge International Education. An important distinction between the two is that Cambridge OCR qualifications must comply with UK government regulations set by Ofqual while Cambridge International Education's GCSEs and GCE A-Levels do not.

Cambridge OCR also manages the UK's national examination centre registration numbering system on behalf of several Joint Council for Qualifications (JCQ) member bodies.

== History ==
The name OCR reflects the fact that it was created in 1998 through the amalgamation of the University of Cambridge Local Examinations Syndicate (UCLES) and the Royal Society of Arts Examinations Board (RSAEB). At the time of the merger, UCLES' qualifications were offered by two wholly owned subsidiaries: the Oxford and Cambridge Examinations and Assessments Council (OCEAC) for A-Level and the Midland Examining Group (MEG) for GCSE and Certificate of Achievement. RSAEB offered vocational qualifications. After the merger, the OCR name replaced all previous names.

UCLES had previously taken over the University of Oxford Delegacy of Local Examinations (founded 1857) and the Oxford and Cambridge Schools Examinations Board (founded 1873). Both were acquired by UCLES in 1995; earlier, it had taken over the Southern Universities Joint Board (SUJB). The acquisition of RSAEB was completed in 1998 and brought a new range of qualifications and activities to the UCLES Group because RSEAB's principal activity was in vocational qualifications.

The formation of OCR represented the culmination of several decades of corporate activity on the part of UCLES, activity that came about as a response to the policies of successive British governments towards public examinations and the provision of qualifications, as well as moves to strengthen the regulatory framework.

In September 2025, Oxford Cambridge and RSA Examinations (abbreviated to OCR) was renamed to become Cambridge OCR.

The following former examination boards are now part of Cambridge OCR:

- East Anglian Examinations Board (EAEB) – partial
- East Midland Regional Examinations Board (EMREB)
- Midland Examining Group (MEG)
- Oxford and Cambridge Examinations and Assessment Council (OCEAC)
- Oxford and Cambridge Schools Examination Board (OCSEB) / (O&C)
- Royal Society of Arts (RSA)
- Southern Regional Examinations Board (SREB)
- Southern Universities Joint Board for Schools Examinations (SUJB)
- University of Cambridge Local Examinations Syndicate (UCLES)
- University of Oxford Delegacy of Local Examinations (UODLE)
- The West Midlands Examination Board (WMEB)

Cambridge University Press & Assessment is a non-teaching department of the University of Cambridge, making Cambridge the only British university to maintain a direct link with a school exam board. Cambridge Assessment, which celebrated its 160th anniversary in 2018, became part of Cambridge University Press & Assessment when it merged with Cambridge University Press in August 2021.

== Qualifications ==
As of September 2026, Cambridge OCR offers qualifications on over 40 subjects at GCSE and A Level, and 100 vocational qualifications. The organisation's "Cambridge Technicals" or "CTEC"s are equivalent to the BTECs offered by Pearson Edexcel.

== Public Policy ==
In November 2011, OCR submitted written evidence to the Education Select Committee. This detailed their approach to ensuring accuracy when setting, marking and awarding. It discussed errors in exam papers and what their response to this was, the increasing use of on screen marking and using expert judgement to ensure accuracy of awarding. OCR recommended that there should be increased transparency, greater teacher participation and continued investment in technology to improve accuracy.

An OCR investigation in 2014, into a school redacting an examination paper on evolution, for religious reasons, led Ofqual to write to examination boards to ensure that examination papers do not get redacted. Ofqual’s director of regulatory operations Jane Farleigh contacted the exam boards on the 31 March and told them that this should be treated as malpractice.

During 2024, OCR called on government ministers to resolve “glaring omissions” on climate change and digital literacy, after completing a review specific to 11 to 16 year old children. They advocated for a new independent body to be created, to facilitate a more contemporary curriculum that better reflects the diversity of Britain.

In February 2025, OCR paused changes to a geography GCSE paper, during a government review of the curriculum. In 2025, Members of Parliament questioned Professor Becky Francis, who is the chair of the Curriculum and Assessment Review, about proposals put forward by Jill Duffy, the then Chief Executive of OCR. Her proposals suggested a reduction in the volume of exams at GCSE, which she suggested could have a positive impact on student wellbeing.

== Controversies ==
In some of its material, OCR has made mistakes and inaccuracies, sometimes including inaccurate or fictitious content in subject specifications or errors in exam papers.

1998: All the UK schools examinations and vocational qualifications of the UCLES Group were transferred to OCR. Subsequent Physics syllabuses released by OCR included the fictional units the "Ocrawatt" and "Ocrajoule" due to overzealous find-and-replace on MEG's part (in previous and later syllabuses, the units were correctly written as "Megawatt" and "Megajoule".)

2008: The answers to two questions in a GCSE Music paper were given away by accident in the copyright declaration printed on the back of the question paper.

2011: OCR set an impossible maths question in the 2011 AS Mathematics paper. In addition, there were errors in Section B of the Latin Literature paper, confusing names of both authors and characters. 2011 also saw the start of, by now regular, social media protests against the content in exam papers. An A2 Biology paper on Control, Genomes and Environment (F215) had a large emphasis on ecology, deemed by many students to be 'unfair'. This issue was made public on a Facebook page which generated support from thousands of students. The Times and The Times Educational Supplement reported on this story.

2012: A Channel 4 News investigation revealed that examiners were making the most basic errors, such as wrongly adding up marks on hundreds of papers, which in some cases led to candidates in 2011 getting an incorrect grade. A senior supervisor at OCR, David Leitch, ordered his team perform supplementary checks on scripts by the same markers, and found hundreds of errors. This led to OCR ordering these additional checks to stop, and to only inform those schools which had specifically requested scripts to be re-marked. David Leitch was suspended from OCR, after reporting the incident to Ofqual, and informing 30 schools about the mistakes himself. Ofqual have said to have subsequently investigated the exam board, and asked the exam board "to carry out extended checks, identify the weaknesses in its processes and to put these right in time for the January exams". The Department for Education said the level of error was "simply unacceptable".

2014: UK exam regulator Ofqual investigated OCR's "near miss" on issuing GCSE and A-level results on time.

2015: The then Chief Executive of OCR suggested that students should be allowed to use Google and the Internet to research information during examinations. This statement evoked a heated debate with support on the one hand and criticism on the other.

2017: A question in the reformed OCR GCSE English Literature exam, sat by over ten thousand students, swapped the surnames of the families in the play Romeo and Juliet, asking how Tybalt's hatred of the Capulets influenced the outcome of the play, when in fact, Tybalt is a Capulet himself. OCR apologised, undertook to ensure no candidates would be disadvantaged while the regulator Ofqual stated it was "very disappointed to learn of the error". OCR also apologised for "poorly wording" an A-Level Psychology Paper and assured candidates that it could correct it in its marking. Ofqual asked OCR to go through all its remaining papers again to make sure there were no further errors. OCR was eventually fined £175,000 for their error on the English Literature exam, which Ofqual deemed not fit for purpose, as the question was "unanswerable".

2019: After a leak of the A-Level Grade Boundaries ahead of results day, it emerged that in order to pass the new specification Mathematics A-Level (H240), candidates needed to score 13% (40 marks out of 300) to pass. Edexcel, another British exam board, also had similarly low grade boundaries. Subsequently, Ofqual said that they were confident the grade boundaries this year were "sound", so shifted their focus onto the previous year's grade boundaries for the new Mathematics A-Level for the 2,000 students who sat it after studying it for one year. Ofqual said "We want to understand why the grade boundaries were so different between the two years.", and had called the significant shifts in boundaries "unusual". None of the exam boards decided to re-open the 2018 award, after being asked to look at them again by the regulator.

2023: OCR was criticised by pupils and teachers for the level of difficulty in Paper 2 of the Computer Science GCSE. Students took to social media to express concern at the disparity between Paper 1 and Paper 2, as well as the change in style of the paper. OCR assured students that the final mark scheme would reflect the different approaches taken to the exam, and that the grade boundaries would take into account the challenges faced. They also stated they planned to make it free for schools and colleges to access candidate's marked papers.

2025: OCR apologised after multiple mistakes were found in their A Level and AS Level Physics examination papers and mark schemes, with the Institute of Physics contacting OCR with concerns that the issues were “damaging to the reputation of physics”. While some errors were caught before the paper was sat, others were not identified until after the exam, or, in two cases, until after results day, leading to 37 incorrect grades which were corrected after results day. In April 2026 the board entered into a settlement agreement and was fined £270,000 by the Office of Qualifications and Examinations Regulation (Ofqual) for "serious errors".

The exams regulator, Ofqual, reports on the frequency of errors from all exam boards annually.
