= Social impact of the COVID-19 pandemic in the United Kingdom =

Indirect effects of the COVID-19 pandemic in the UK

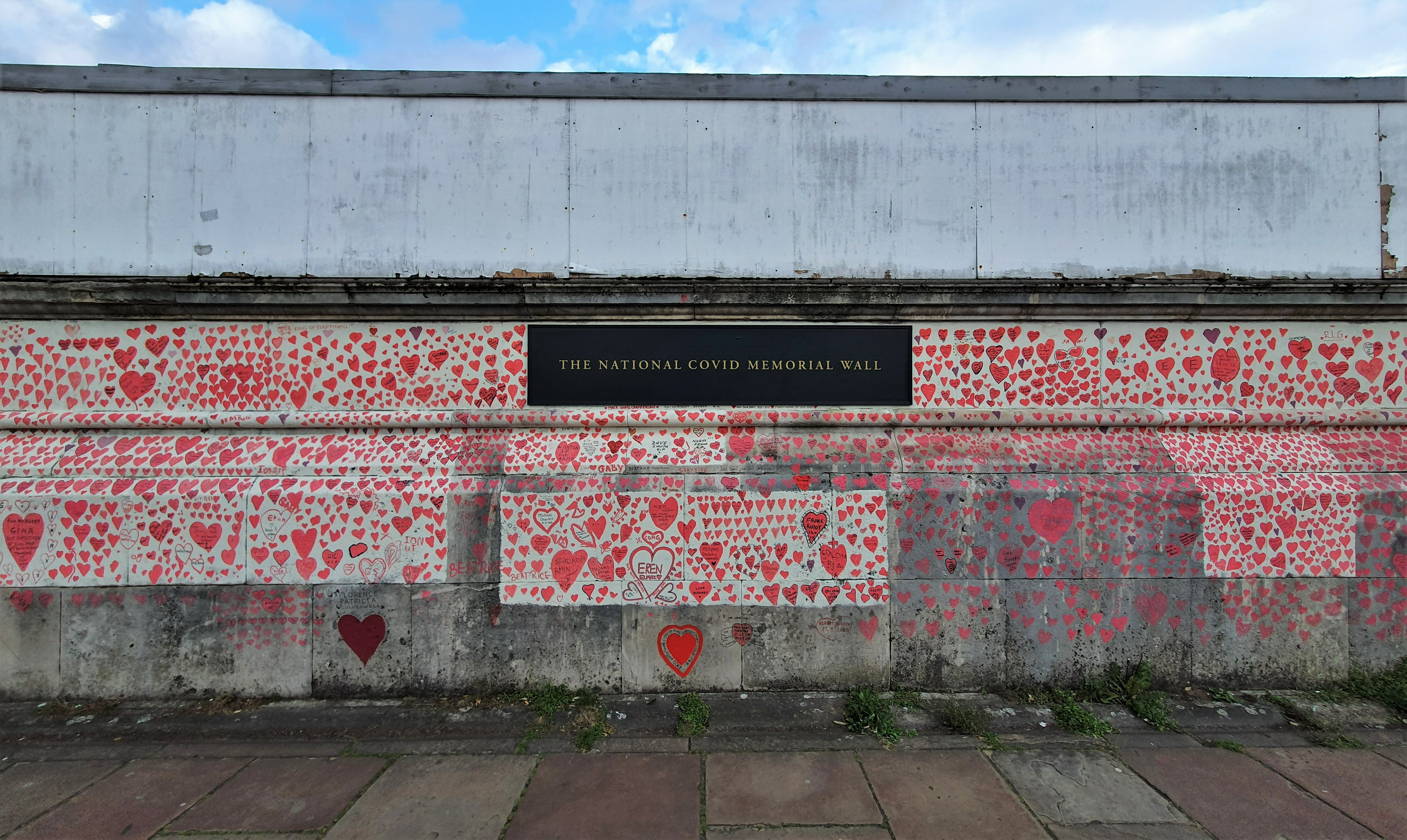
National Covid Memorial Wall in London.

The COVID-19 pandemic in the United Kingdom has had far-reaching consequences in the country that go beyond the spread of the disease itself and efforts to quarantine it, including political, cultural, and social implications.

== Arts and entertainment ==
=== Music ===
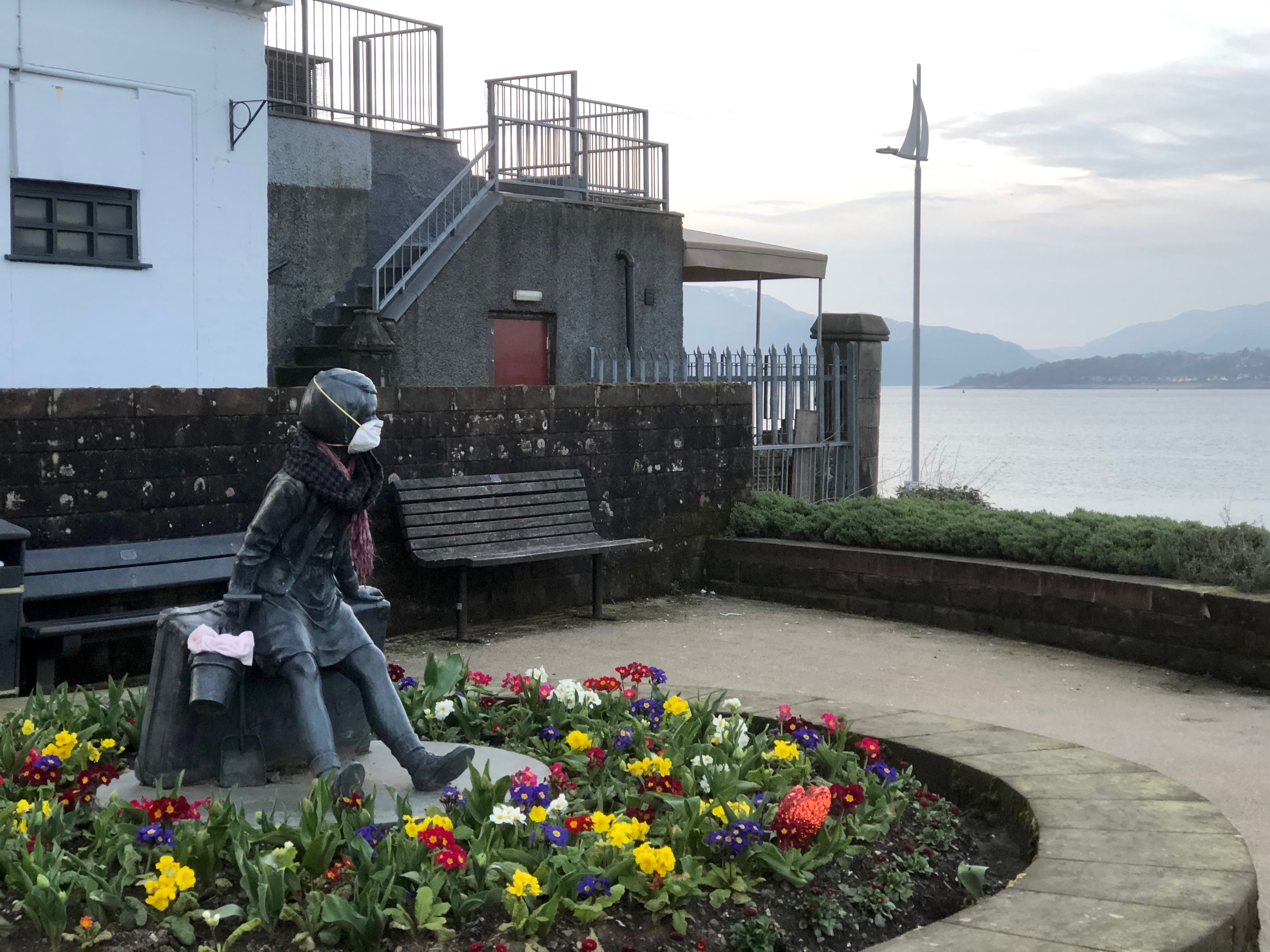
The "Wee Annie" statue in Gourock with a face mask, on 22 March

On 13 March, BBC Radio 1 cancelled its Big Weekend music festival, scheduled to take place at the end of May. Other music events to be cancelled included the C2C: Country to Country festival, the Glastonbury Festival, the Isle of Wight and Download music festivals, the Cambridge Folk Festival, and the Love Supreme Jazz Festival. The organisers of the Download festival announced plans to hold a virtual festival instead, featuring streamed performances and interviews. Big Weekend organisers ran an alternative event, Big Weekend UK 2020, with musicians performing from their homes and on virtual stages, and performances from previous Big Weekend events.

Among the artists and bands to postpone or cancel UK gigs or tours were Avril Lavigne and the Who. Other, including Chris Martin of Coldplay, and Yungblud live-streamed performances on social media. Various musicians announced free gigs for NHS staff.

Even with the United Kingdom beginning to lift the majority of restrictions by late-June 2021, and the government organizing concerts as part of the Event Research Programme to examine the impact of large-scale events with fewer precautions, a large number of British music festivals nonetheless announced that they would also cancel their 2021 editions, including ArcTanGent, Bluedot, Boomtown, Ramblin' Man Fair, and Two Thousand Trees Festival, due to the British government not providing an insurance scheme for such events that would cover losses in the event that they are cancelled for COVID-19-related reasons. Some are also citing travel restrictions that make it difficult to host international performers and attendees. The Digital, Culture, Media and Sport Committee (DCMS) stated on 13 May that it "cannot give full assurance" on such schemes until the guidance for the next stage of its regulations are created.

=== Visual arts ===
A number of artists began painting portraits of NHS workers, as a way of organising their work and thanking them for it. An exhibition is planned, once the pandemic subsides.

=== Theatre and cinema ===
On 15 March, London's Old Vic became the first West End theatre to cancel a performance when it ended its run of Samuel Beckett's Endgame two weeks early. On 16 March, other theatres in London, as well as elsewhere around the UK, closed following Boris Johnson's advice that people should avoid such venues. On 17 March, cinema chains Odeon, Cineworld, Vue and Picturehouse announced they would be closing all their UK outlets. On 1 April, the 2020 Edinburgh festivals, planned for August, were cancelled.

On 26 March the National Theatre launched National Theatre at Home, a two-month programme whereby a different production from its archives would be streamed for free each week. The project began with Richard Bean's comedy One Man, Two Guvnors, featuring James Corden.

=== Television and radio ===
Television programmes to be affected included forthcoming series of Peaky Blinders and Line of Duty, which had their filming schedules delayed. On 13 March, ITV announced that the 2020 series finale of Ant & Dec's Saturday Night Takeaway, scheduled to be broadcast from Walt Disney World in Florida would no longer go ahead after the resort announced its intention to close as a precautionary measure. On 16 March, ITV announced that the filming schedule for its two soaps, Coronation Street and Emmerdale had not been affected by the pandemic, but filming ceased on 23 March. On 18 March ITV announced the semi-final of the ninth series of The Voice UK, scheduled for 28 March, would be postponed until later in the year.

On 16 March, the BBC delayed implementation of its planned changes to TV licences for those aged over 75 from June to August. On 25 March the BBC also announced that it would delay its plans to cut 450 news jobs due to the pressure of covering the pandemic.

On 17 March, the BBC announced major changes to the schedule across the network. While some programmes were suspended, others such as Newsnight and The Andrew Marr Show continued with a smaller number of production staff. Some podcasts were also suspended. On 18 March it was announced that filming of soap operas and regular dramas would be suspended. The BBC also said it would show more educational programmes to cater for children not attending school, and more programmes focused on health, fitness, education, religion and food recipes. On 23 March, ITV ceased the live broadcasting of two programmes.

On radio, some BBC World Service programmes were suspended. Summaries on Radio 2, Radio 3, Radio 4 and 5 Live were merged into a single output, with BBC 6 using the same script. The BBC Asian Network and Newsbeat worked together to maintain production of stories. On 18 March, the BBC announced that its local radio stations in England would broadcast a virtual church service, led initially by the Archbishop of Canterbury, but with plans to expand religious services to cover other faiths. On the same day Radio News Hub, a radio news bulletin provider based in Leeds, announced that it would produce a daily ten-minute programme giving a round-up of information about the pandemic, and that would be made available free of charge to radio stations. On 28 March, BBC Local Radio announced that it had teamed up with manufacturers, retailers and the social isolation charity WaveLength to give away free DAB radios to people over 70.

=== Museums ===
As of August 2021, the pandemic led to 4,700 redundancies across the museum sector.

== Defence ==
The coronavirus pandemic affected British military deployments at home and abroad. Training exercises, including those in Canada and Kenya, had to be cancelled to free up personnel for the COVID Support Force. The British training mission in Iraq, part of Operation Shader, had to be down-scaled. An air base supporting this military operation also confirmed nine cases of coronavirus. The British Army paused face-to-face recruitment and basic training operations, instead conducting them virtually. Training locations, such as Royal Military Academy Sandhurst and HMS Raleigh, had to adapt their passing out parades. Cadets involved were made to stand 2 metres (6 ft 7 in) apart in combat dress and there were no spectators in the grandstands. Ceremonial duties and displays were stopped. The British Army deployed two experts to NATO to help counter disinformation around the pandemic. The Government's defence and security review, named the Integrated Review, was delayed.

In March 2020, following requests for military aid to the civil authorities, the Ministry of Defence announced the formation of the COVID Support Force under the Standing Joint Commander (UK), Lieutenant General Tyrone Urch at Aldershot to support public services and civil authorities in tackling the pandemic. Unlike the police and some other civil agencies, members of the armed forces (during peacetime) have no powers over and above those of ordinary citizens. The support force initially consisted of 20,000 personnel but later grew to amount to 23,000. Two military operations; Operation Rescript, based in the UK, and Operation Broadshare, focused on overseas defence activities, were launched. Chief of the Defence Staff Nick Carter ordered the military to prepare for a "six month" operation and to be on an "operational footing" by mid-April. The COVID Support Force was initially tasked with driving oxygen tankers for the NHS, as well as delivering medical supplies, including PPE, to hospitals. Prior to the announcement of the COVID Support Force, the armed forces had assisted the British government in repatriating British citizens from affected areas, including China and Japan. The Royal Air Force also repatriated British and EU citizens from Cuba. The armed forces additionally assisted in the transportation of coronavirus patients around the UK, including Shetland and the Isles of Scilly. On 23 March 2020, Joint Helicopter Command began assisting the coronavirus relief effort by transporting people and supplies. Helicopters were based at RAF Leeming to cover Northern England and Scotland, whilst helicopters based at RAF Benson, RAF Odiham and RNAS Yeovilton supported the Midlands and Southern England.

The armed forces helped to build temporary hospitals, testing centres and mortuaries, and supported ambulance services across the country. The COVID Support Force had responded to 76 requests for assistance from government ministries with 2,680 personnel deployed from a total of 23,000 on standby. 2,300 vehicles were also in use as temporary ambulances and to transport personnel and supplies in 34 locations across the country. On 16 April 2020, it was reported that 9.1% of the defence workforce, representing 13,000 personnel, were off work due to coronavirus, whilst under 100 personnel had tested positive. Carter described the military's assistance to the NHS as the "single greatest logistic challenge" he had come across.

On 26 April 2020, forces were reported as testing critical workers and people at risk, in areas with "significant" demand. Following the Government's announcement of a target of 100,000 coronavirus tests to be carried out per day, the armed forces helped deploy and operate mobile testing units.

== Education ==
Following cases in Italy, the Cransley School in Northwich, Cheshire, and Trinity Catholic College in Middlesbrough closed, as some of their pupils had returned with symptoms from Italy. Fourteen schools in England had closed by 28 February. Loughborough University reported a student confirmed to have the virus after recent travel to Italy, and indicated that several staff members and students began self-isolation.

Cambridge University closed all buildings from 20 March, which was criticised by the local UCU as students from countries with weaker healthcare provisions would be forced to return home. More than a thousand Cambridge students signed an open letter requesting alternatives to cancelled examinations in Cambridge, including the option to retake the year in 2020–21.

Coventry University first suspended all graduation ceremonies due to be held in March and April, and from 20 March, suspended all face-to-face teaching, in favour of on-line delivery. Many other higher education institutions took similar steps at around the same time.

All UK schools closed by 20 March 2020 for an indefinite period of time, except for children of key workers and vulnerable children. GCSE and A Level exams were cancelled, an unprecedented action in UK educational history, with results awarded using predicted grades and teacher assessment. On 16 April the Department for Education said these grades would be published on their original intended dates, 13 August for A Levels and 20 August for GCSEs. In Scotland it was announced that exams would not take place and coursework would not be marked for National 5, Higher and Advanced Higher courses with teachers estimating grades.

On 7 May Welsh Government Minister Kirsty Williams MS, announced that schools in Wales would not reopen on 1 June.

== Events ==
On 23 March, Pride in London, the UK's largest LGBT Pride festival, scheduled for 27 June, was postponed. It was one of more than a hundred pride events to be postponed or cancelled in the UK. On 3 April, Brighton Pride, scheduled for Saturday 1 August, was cancelled.

On 6 April the Grand Orange Lodge of Ireland of the Orange Order announced that the traditional Twelfth of July parades in Northern Ireland had been cancelled.

The national VE Day 75th anniversary events planned for 8 to 10 May were cancelled.

== Law and order ==
A poll published on 20 March concluded that 23% of British adults were strictly following the government's coronavirus advice. In March police forces in each nation of the UK were given powers to arrest and fine citizens who broke lockdown rules. The National Police Chiefs' Council said police had issued their first fines for people breaking lockdown rules on 27 March. The fixed penalty notices were £60 but would be reduced to £30 if paid within 14 days. By 31 March, some police forces and individual officers, were being criticised by a variety of people including, former Supreme Court judge Lord Sumption, former Justice secretary David Gauke, former Chancellor George Osborne and privacy and civil liberties group Big Brother Watch for over-zealous and incorrect application of the new powers. Police had put black dye into Harpur Hill Quarry and using a drone, filmed people before posting the images on social media. New guidance to "Engage, Explain, Encourage and Enforce" was released by the National Police Chiefs Council.

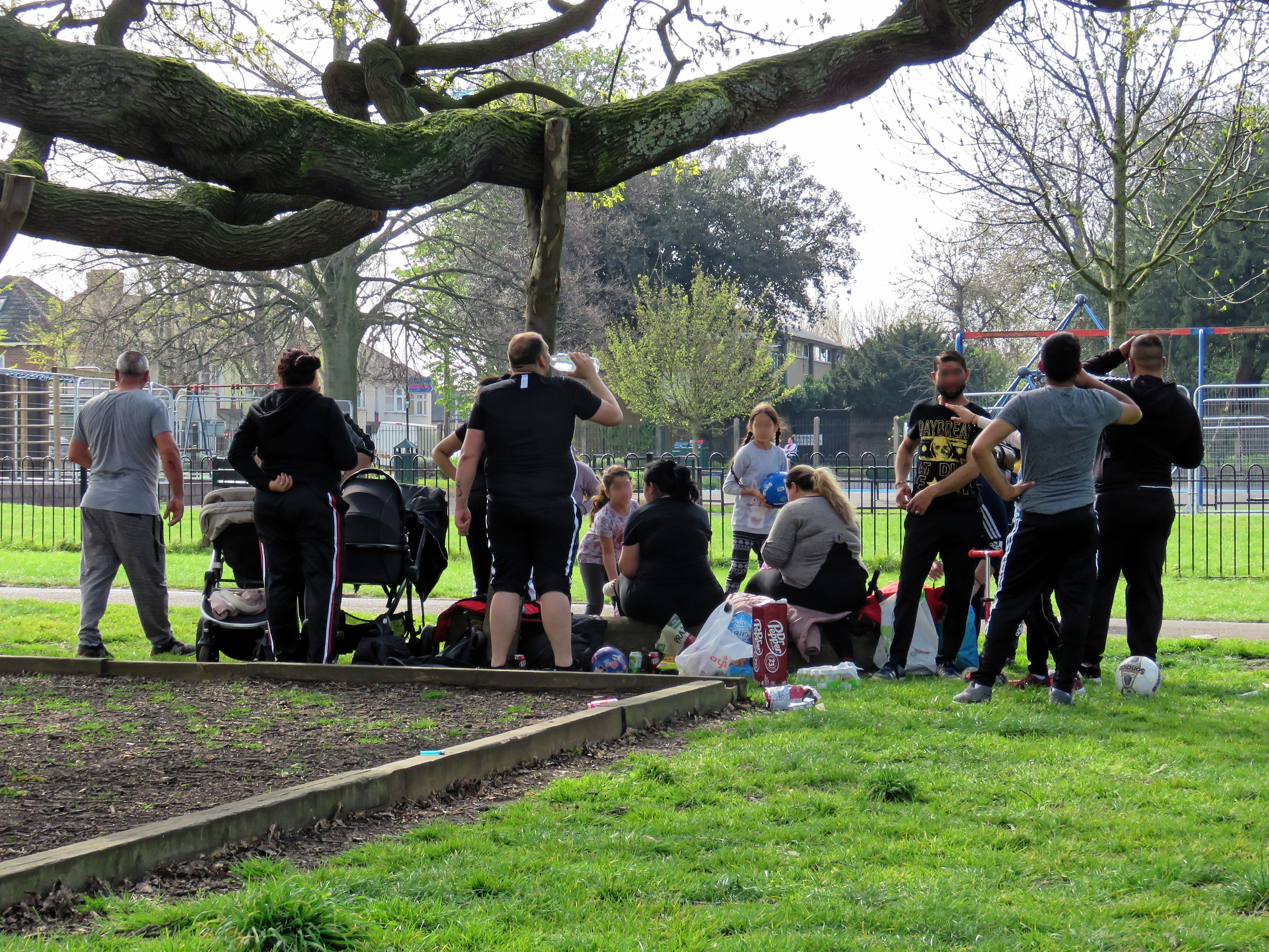
A group of people in London, 8 April 2020

According to data from the National Police Chiefs' Council, around 9,000 people were issued fines for breaking lockdown rules in England and Wales, between 27 March and 27 April. National Police Chiefs’ Council figures from 27 March to 11 May (the date when fines in England increased) showed that more than 14,000 fines were issued for breaking lockdown rules in England and Wales. There were 862 repeat offenders in the figures with one person fined 9 times. The Easter weekend (11 and 12 April) had the highest amount of fines issued within the period. The Crown Prosecution Service stated 56 people were wrongly charged, mainly due to Welsh regulations being applied in England and vice versa. In the first two weeks of the coronavirus police powers being introduced more than 500 fixed penalty notices were issued in Scotland. Police Scotland figures from 6 April to 6 May showed that there had been 21,487 breaches of lockdown rules. The figures highlighted that people were attracted to rural beauty spots with two areas Loch Lomond and Stirling in the top five areas of Scotland for breaches. When caught breaking lockdown black people were given fines twice as often as white people by the Metropolitan Police.

There have been reports of hate incidents against Italian and Chinese persons and a Singaporean student was assaulted in London in an attack that police linked to coronavirus fears. In addition there have been reports of young people deliberately coughing and spitting in the faces of people, including an incident involving health workers.

On 9 May, police broke up an anti-lockdown protest took place in London consisting of around 40 people. It was thought to be the first such protest in the UK following protests in other nations. It was reported that around 60 protests had been planned on the weekend of the 16 May, with police saying that they were preparing to break them up. Protests took place in Belfast, Glasgow, London and Southampton, with several protesters arrested and fined at the London demonstration.

Following a conspiracy theory regarding 5G mobile phone masts, 77 mobile phone masts were attacked across the country, including the one serving NHS Nightingale hospital in Birmingham. Philip Jansen, the chief executive of BT, said that 39 engineers had been physically or verbally assaulted by members of the public, with some also receiving death threats. The trade union the Communication Workers Union stated that they had received 120 reports of workers being abused.

=== Fraud ===
Following the commencement of the job retention scheme, there had been over 800 reports of fraudulent claims by mid-May. Employers were accused of claiming whilst still having employees attend work. During the contact tracing app trial on the Isle of Wight the Chartered Trading Standards Institute found evidence of a phishing scam. In the scam recipients would receive a text stating that they had been in contact with someone with COVID-19 and were directed to a website to input their personal details. The National Cyber Security Centre had taken down over 2,000 examples of fraud during March and April. Local councils found fake goods being sold including testing kits, face masks and hand sanitiser. There had also been reports of scams involving the replacement school meals scheme and incidents of people posing as government officials and council workers depending on their target along with fake IT workers. Benefit officials said that up to £1.5 billion could have been lost due to fraudulent benefit claims.

=== Courts and prisons ===
On 17 March, trials lasting longer than three days were postponed until May in England and Wales, while Scottish courts were not starting any new trial indefinitely. In England and Wales those cases already running would continue in the hope of reaching a conclusion. Following the suspension of all new trials due to the pandemic, law reform charity JUSTICE led a series of mock virtual trials to examine viability and safety.

The government released specific guidance to prisons in the event of coronavirus symptoms or cases, specifically the rule that "any prisoner or detainee with a new, continuous cough or a high temperature should be placed in protective isolation for 7 days". There are around 83,000 prisoners in England and Wales. On 24 March, the Ministry of Justice announced that prison visits would be suspended and that inmates would be confined to their cells. To maintain communication between prisoners and their families, the government promised 900 secure phones to 55 prisons, with calls being monitored and time-limited. In a committee meeting on the same day, Justice Secretary Robert Buckland suggested that 50 pregnant inmates might be given early release, and another 9,000 inmates awaiting trial could be transferred to bail hostels.

On 14 April, the Ministry of Justice ordered 500 modular buildings, reportedly adapted from shipping containers, to provide additional single prison cell accommodation at seven jails: HMPs North Sea Camp, Littlehey, Hollesley Bay, Highpoint, Moorland, Lindholme and Humber. Following a COVID-19 case in HMP Manchester, public services think tank Reform called for the release of 2,305 "low-risk" offenders on short sentences to reduce the risk of coronavirus on the prison population. Similar actions have been taken in Iran and the United States. Former justice secretary David Gauke echoed similar sentiments, citing the "churn" of prisoners going in and out of prison as a risk. Up to 4,000 prisoners in England and Wales are to be released. Amnesty International's Europe Deputy Director of Research said that authorities in UK should consider releasing those who are more vulnerable to COVID-19.

On 18 March, the first coronavirus case was reported within the UK prison population. The prisoner, who had been serving time in HMP Manchester (commonly referred to as Strangeways), was moved to a hospital. While no other prisoners or staff tested positive for the virus, thirteen prisoners and four members of staff were put into isolation as a precaution. On 26 March, it was reported that an 84-year-old sex offender had died from COVID-19 on 22 March at HMP Littlehey in Cambridgeshire, becoming the first inmate in the UK to die from the virus. On 28 April, Public Health England had identified around 2,000 "possible/probable" and confirmed COVID-19 cases; outbreaks had occurred in 75 different institutions, with 35 inmates treated in hospital and 15 deaths. In mid-May the Scottish Prison Service said that six inmates who had died were suspected to have had COVID-19.

On 19 July, the Ministry of Justice announced the creation of ten temporary courts for England and Wales, to help cope with the backlog of cases.

In April 2020, the Court of Appeal advised courts in England and Wales that the "conditions in prisons" brought about by the COVID pandemic "represent a factor which can properly be taken into account in deciding whether to suspend a sentence". The Sentencing Council noted that during sentencing courts "must bear in mind the practical realities of the effects of the current health emergency".

=== Immigration centres ===
During mid-March, 300 people were released from immigration detention centres because of the pandemic following a campaign by charities concerned with an outbreak of COVID-19 in the centres. On 25 March, it was reported that three immigration detention centres had reported cases of people with coronavirus. On 2 April, a letter leaked from G4S, a company running immigration detention centres for the Home Office, said detainees who were at high risk from COVID-19 were being put in solitary confinement.

== Politics ==
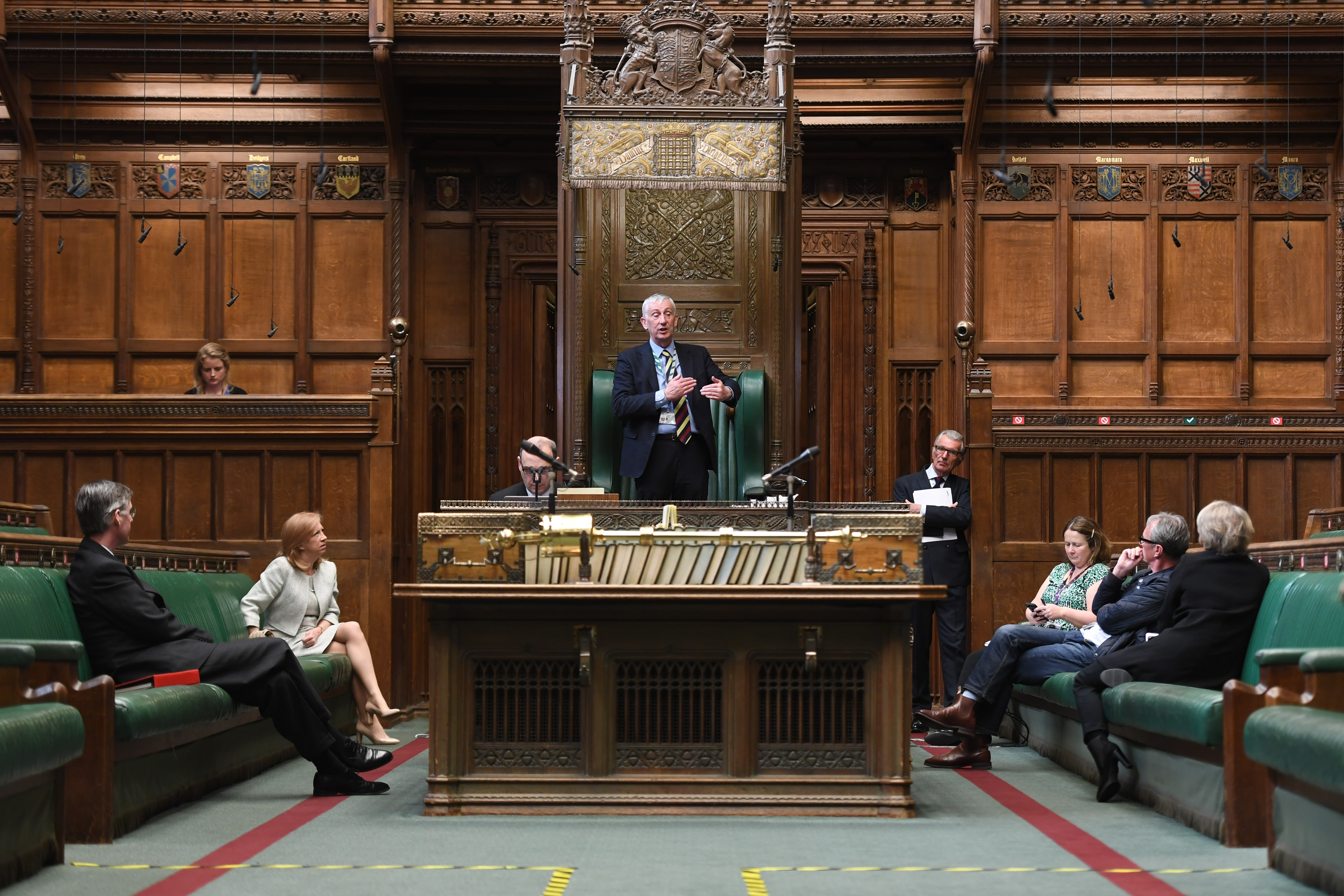
A rehearsal for hybrid remote and in-person procedures in the UK's House of Commons to reduce the spread of COVID-19 among parliamentarians in April 2020

The British government response to the COVID-19 pandemic has been politically controversial, in particular the level of preparedness and the early response to the outbreak and timing of subsequent lockdowns in autumn and winter 2020 that whether they influenced country's high death toll. Shortages of personal protective equipment (PPE) for health workers, as well as some supplies of PPE later procured proving to be inadequate, attracted controversy during the early months of the pandemic. A public inquiry into the government's handling was announced in May 2021 to take place in 2023 after demands from pressure group Covid-19 Bereaved Families for Justice.

In May 2020, the actions of Boris Johnson's senior aide, Dominic Cummings, were the subject of a political scandal as he was accused of breaking lockdown rules while experiencing symptoms of COVID-19. Johnson's defence of him, and Cummings' public press conference to defend his innocence both attracted criticism, as was the eventual rejection of widespread calls for Cummings to resign over the breach. Cummings left the government in late 2020, and subsequently criticised the government's response to the pandemic, including in a seven-hour testimony to the Commons Heath, and Science and Technology committees in May 2021.

In August 2020, school exam grades standardisation algorithm attracted controversy. Whilst the algorithm was designed to combat grade inflation nearly 36% of students were one grade lower than teachers' predictions and 3% were down two grades. This resulted in public outcry. In response to the outcry, on 15 August, Gavin Williamson said that the grading system is here to stay, and there will be "no U-turn, no change". Two days later on 17 August, Ofqual and Gavin Williamson agreed to a u-turn and grades would now be reissued using unmoderated teacher predictions.

Government contracts related to the pandemic response have also attracted political controversy, with several senior politicians including Matt Hancock accused of cronyism by providing lucrative contracts to private companies connected to the Conservative Party. Hancock was found to have acted unlawfully by the High Court by not publishing details of a contract within 30 days. The Greensill scandal, which implicated former Prime Minister David Cameron, involved Cameron lobbying the UK government to receive an emergency loan for supply chain financing firm Greensill Capital as part of the government's economic response to COVID-19, and highlighted links between civil servants and private companies. COVID-19 related contracts culminated in a lobbying scandal involving Conservative MP Owen Paterson, leading to his resignation despite initial attempts by the government to avoid Paterson's suspension from parliament.

It has also been suggested that the pandemic has highlighted regional inequalities in the UK including the purported North–South divide. Leaders in Northern England such as Mayor of Greater Manchester Andy Burnham and several Conservative MPs, including those in the Northern Research Group, criticised the government when their regions were placed under local lockdown regulations and later tier regulations in England, citing the economic impact and accused the central government of providing inadequate fiscal support.

Controversies have arisen from government officials allegedly breaching public health advice or restrictions. Catherine Calderwood and Neil Ferguson resigned from their respective positions for travelling during the March 2020 lockdown. Health Secretary Matt Hancock became embroiled in a scandal in 2021 when photographs emerged of him breaching social distancing measures by kissing aide Gina Coladangelo in his workplace, which led to his resignation in June 2021. Following the July 2021 lifting of the legal requirement to wear face coverings indoors, parliament became divided along ideological lines, with those who viewed them "as an unreasonable imposition on personal freedoms", mainly Conservative MPs, no longer wearing them whilst others continued to wear them. Starting in December 2021, "Partygate" became a major political scandal, revolving around government and Conservative Party staff holding social gatherings during COVID-19 lockdowns in the UK, when these were prohibited. Boris Johnson and Rishi Sunak both received fixed penalty notices. The controversy eventually played a role in a later government crisis and Johnson's resignation.

Some political parties and politicians have opposed government pandemic restrictions. The COVID Recovery Group within the Conservative Party pushed to lift lockdown restrictions while they were in place. Nigel Farage's Brexit Party rebranded as Reform UK in late 2020, with its primary focus being opposing COVID-19 lockdowns.

The government implemented a Virtual House of Commons to minimise the spread of the virus among parliamentarians.

The leader of the opposition, Keir Starmer, his deputy Angela Rayner, and other members of the Labour Party were investigated by the police for alleged breaches of COVID-19 regulations in the 'Beergate' affair. They were eventually cleared of any wrongdoing.

=== Democracy ===
The COVID-19 restrictions that impacted basic liberties in the UK were outlined in section 52 of the Coronavirus Act 2020, where the government had the ‘power to restrict or prohibit gatherings or events.’ This act posed significant challenges to ‘the right to protest’ protected by ‘the right to free assembly and association’ under articles 10 and 11 of the European Court of Human Rights . Initially, these restrictions were generally accepted as a small cost to support the country's efforts in preventing the spread of the virus. However, there were two major events where this position was challenged, questioning the role of COVID-19 in undermining these liberties. The first was the demonstrations from the Black Lives Matter movement, where an estimated 137,500 people were involved in towns and cities across the UK. The second was during the second lockdown in 2021 as part of the campaign ‘Reclaim These Streets', where women were arrested for attending the vigil of ‘Sarah Everard’ who was killed by a Metropolitan police officer. In both cases, arrests were made under the Coronavirus Act 2020, which took away the liberties of the right to protest from these people. Therefore, as a direct impact of COVID-19, the liberties and freedoms of citizens were challenged, having implications for the principles of democracy.

== Racial disparities ==
In all countries which collect and publish data on race, COVID-19 has disproportionately affected communities of colour. In the UK, ethnic minorities are generally more likely to work in jobs (such as security guards or supermarket staff) where they are most likely to be exposed to the public, and therefore at greater risk of infection. They are also more likely to live in cities and urban environments and in crowded multi-generational households. In addition, ethnic minorities are more likely to have pre-existing conditions such as diabetes and heart disease, which increase the risk of dying from the virus.

According to a government-ordered inquiry released by Public Health England in June 2020, Black, Asian and minority ethnic (BAME) people in the UK are more likely to contract and die from COVID-19 complications than White Britons. Black people in the UK are more likely to be diagnosed with the disease, but the disparity in death rates is greatest among people of Bangladeshi heritage, who are twice as likely to die of COVID-19 than White people.

Data from the Office for National Statistics (2 March–28 July 2020) showed that most ethnic minorities in England and Wales (excluding Indians and Chinese) are more likely than Whites to live in the most deprived 10% of areas in the UK, where death from COVID-19 is more likely. In England, a Black man is nearly 4 times as likely to die from the disease than a White man of the same age. Bangladeshis are two times as likely to live in such areas, and Bangladeshi men are three times as likely to die from the disease. When adjusting for geography, this ratio fell to 2.3; controlling for poverty and exposure at work, this fell to 1.9; controlling for self-reported health concerns and pre-existing conditions, this still left the Bangladeshi men 1.5 times more likely to die from COVID-19 than White men of the same age. This coincides with reports from epidemiologists such as Sir Michael Marmot and others, who conclude that worse health of Black people worldwide (particularly Black men) can be explained by conventional socioeconomic measures only in part; discrimination and prejudice in healthcare, more pre-existing health conditions and possible genetic factors are considered to play a part.

== Racism ==
On 12 February 2020, Sky News reported that some British Chinese said they were facing increasing levels of racist abuse. It was recorded that hate crimes against British Chinese people between January and March 2020 have tripled the number of hate crimes in the past two years in the UK. According to the London Metropolitan Police, between January and June 2020, 457 race-related crimes against British East and Southeast Asians (ESEA).

Verbal abuse has been one of the common forms of racism experienced by British Chinese. Just before the lockdown in February 2020, British Chinese children recalled experiences of fear and frustration due to bullying and name calling in their schools. According to a June 2020 poll, 76% of British Chinese had received racial slurs at least once, and 50% regularly received racial slurs, a significantly higher frequency than experienced by any other racial minority.

Racism during the pandemic has also impacted a number of Chinese-owned business, especially within the catering business, as well as an increase in violent assaults against British East and Southeast Asians.

In light of the increasing racism in the UK, a non-profit, grassroots organisation besea.n established "to promote positive representation of ESEA people in the UK and tackle discrimination at all levels in [British] society." The organisation planned to establish ESEA heritage month in September 2021 to celebrate the history and culture of ESEA.

== Religion ==
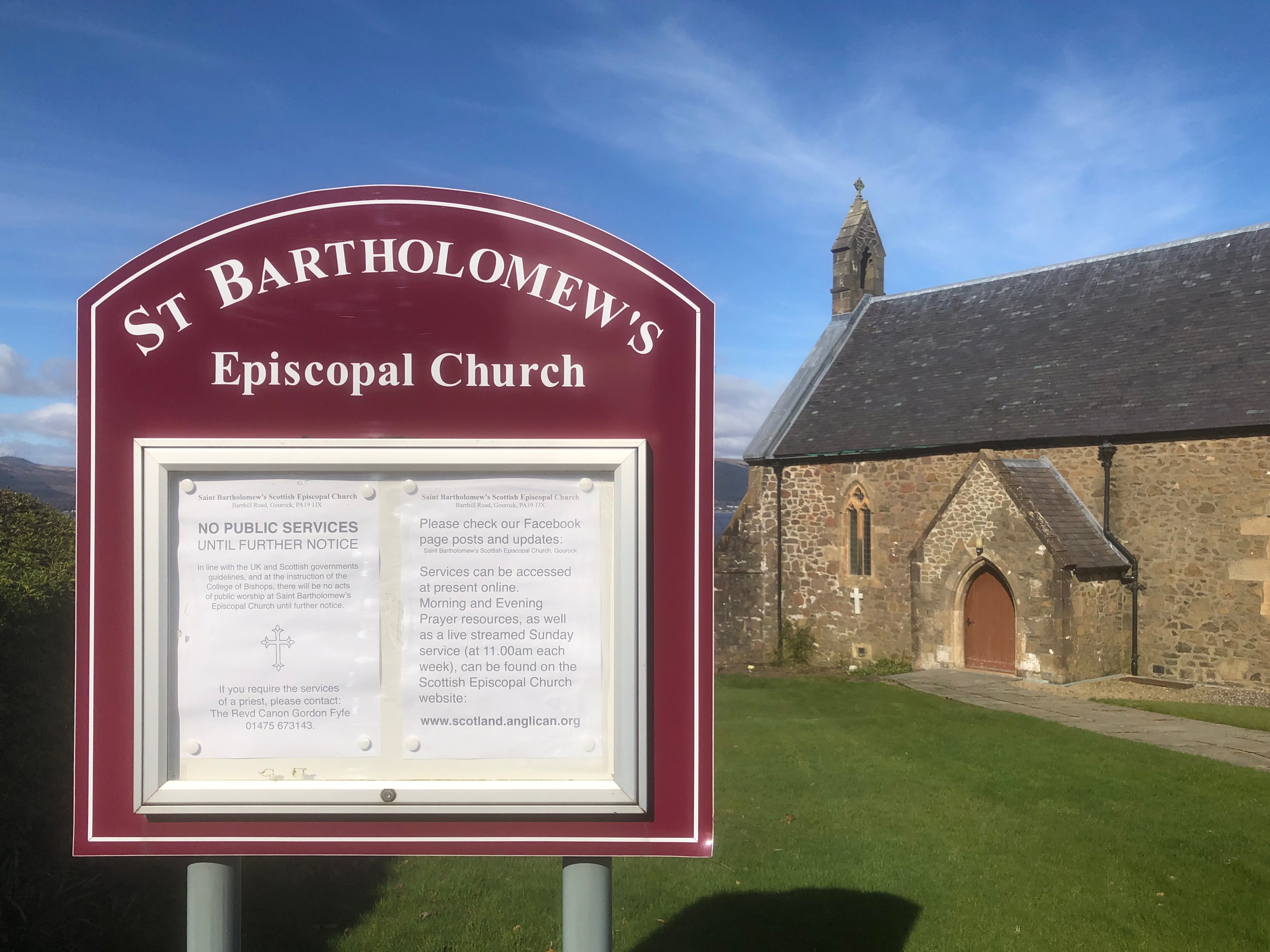
Statement at Scottish Episcopal Church in Gourock: no public services until further notice.

The Church of England and other Anglican churches in the British Isles suspended in-person worship during the COVID-19 pandemic. The Archbishop of Canterbury led a virtual service that was broadcast on 39 local BBC stations. The Catholic Church, Methodist Church in Great Britain and the Society of Friends also put a temporary moratorium on public worship.

The Chief Rabbi in the United Kingdom advised the suspension of worship in synagogues, and the Muslim Council of Britain ordered the closure of mosques in the country.

In September 2020, just under 700 British church leaders and ministers submitted a letter to Prime Minister and the First Ministers of the devolved assemblies urging that churches would not be closed again.

== Royal family ==
On 19 March, the 93-year-old Queen Elizabeth II left London for Windsor Castle. On the same day she issued a message to the nation noting that the country and the world were entering a period of great concern and uncertainty. On 5 April 2020 the Queen gave a televised address watched by 23.97 million people. The Queen additionally recorded an audio message for Easter Saturday, in which she spoke of hope and said "coronavirus will not overcome us". The annual gun salute and Trooping the Colour to mark the Queen's birthday were cancelled for the first time.

In March, Prince Charles greeted people with a namaste gesture instead of a handshake at the Commonwealth Service at Westminster Abbey and the Prince's Trust Awards. On 10 March, Charles met Albert II, Prince of Monaco, who later was diagnosed with the infection. On 25 March, Charles tested positive and self-isolated at Birkhall on the Balmoral Castle estate. Concerns were raised for the health of the entire royal family, as well as concerns that he may have unwittingly become a super-spreader of the disease due to the vast number of people he regularly meets. Charles last saw the Queen on 12 March, one day before the earliest date medical experts believed he would have been contagious. The Duchess of Cornwall tested negative, but self-isolated. On 30 March Clarence House, the Prince's official residence, confirmed that he had come out of self-isolation after seven days having recovered from the illness. The Prince released a video message on 1 April in support of Age UK. Charles remotely opened the Nightingale hospital at the ExCeL on 3 April, which was the first time any member of the royal family had opened something remotely. On 6 April, the Duchess came out of self-isolation after showing no symptoms for 14 days.

Princes William and Harry both sent messages out via social media in response to the pandemic on 19 March. The Duke and Duchess of Cambridge supported a PHE campaign to protect people's mental health. William remotely opened the Nightingale Hospital at the National Exhibition Centre on 16 April. Prince William allowed land at Kensington Palace to be used for refuelling air ambulances. The Duchess of Cambridge launched a new initiative with the National Portrait Gallery called "Hold Still", to highlight heroes and helpers and acts of kindness. The Royal Foundation launched a mental health initiative called "Our Frontline". Prince Philip issued a rare statement on 20 April, in which he thanked key workers. The Countess of Wessex and Princess Eugenie helped charities in preparing and delivering food to NHS staff amidst the pandemic. Sarah, Duchess of York's foundation the Sarah's Trust helped with providing aid for NHS, care home and hospice staff by delivering more than 150,000 items, including food, masks, scrubs, and toiletries. The Duke of Cambridge also volunteered for the crisis helpline Shout 85258, providing anonymous mental support via text message to people during the lockdown.

Further royal events in May and June were scaled back or cancelled including Princess Beatrice's wedding.

== Sociological research ==
In March 2020, UK Research and Innovation announced the launch of a website to explain the scientific evidence and the facts about the virus, the disease, the epidemic, and its control, in a bid to dispel misinformation. The editorial team come from University of Oxford, European Bioinformatics Institute, London School of Hygiene & Tropical Medicine, Imperial College London, University of Glasgow and King's College London.

Research carried out by the Reuters Institute for the Study of Journalism at the University of Oxford concluded that of 225 examples false or misleading claims about coronavirus 88% of the claims had appeared on social media platforms, with 9% of the claims on television and 8% in news outlets. One such claim about 5G mobile phone masts which began on social media, ended up with arson attacks on masts. A YouGov survey for the Institute concluded that 54% of the people polled thought that the UK government was doing a good job of responding to the pandemic. A quarter of those surveyed felt that the pandemic had been exaggerated by the media indicating that criticism could be eroding trust. An earlier Sky News survey also concluded that people surveyed thought that the media were being overly critical of the government. The Sky News survey simply asked the public about trust in journalists. Polls by YouGov, the Reuters Institute, Survation, Ipsos MORI and research by Ofcom, concluded that broadcasters and newspapers were widely considered to be the most trusted sources of information on pandemic. According to research from Ofcom, the BBC was the most trusted broadcaster on the pandemic, followed by ITV, Sky, Channel 4 and Channel 5. The newspapers The Guardian, Financial Times, The Daily Telegraph and The Times were ranked with trust levels similar to that of the television broadcasters during the pandemic. A survey by YouGov for the Reuters Institute concluded that the BBC's output dominated online news coverage in the UK with 36% of the population saying that they had been on the corporation's website to consume news. Around 16% polled said that they had visited The Guardian's website, with Sky News and MailOnline in joint third place with 9% of those polled saying that they had visited their sites. A few weeks after the start of the pandemic Reuters Institute and Ofcom both said that people were actively trying to avoid the news coverage about it.

A study by a team of researchers from the University of Sheffield and Ulster University concluded that young men were more likely to break lockdown rules than women. The study concluded that those suffering from depression were more likely to break the rules. Around half of the participants said that they felt anxious during the restrictions. The team called on the government to issue better target messages for young people. According to data from the National Police Chiefs' Council, two-thirds of the people who were issued fines for breaking lockdown rules in England and Wales, between 27 March and 27 April, were between the ages of 18 and 34. Approximately eight out of 10 of those who were issued fines were men.

Research by the Institute for Fiscal Studies concluded that children from wealthy homes were spending more time studying at home when compared to those from the poorest households.

A study of smart meter and survey data by researchers at University College London found that in the first year of the pandemic domestic energy consumption increased on average by 7.8% (electricity demand) and by 5.7% (gas demand) with the greatest increases during the winter lockdown of January - March 2021 (by 11.6% for electricity and 9.0% for gas). By the start of 2022 electricity use remained 2.2% higher than predicted while gas use was around 1.9% lower. The greatest increase in household energy consumption was observed in households with children and households with low dwelling efficiency. Wealthier households also increased their energy consumption by significantly more than those less well off, who typically returned to pre-pandemic (or lower) levels of demand by summer 2021.

The impact of restrictions and their subsequent easing was also felt in the heritage sector, with a noticeable change in visitor behaviour.

== Sport ==
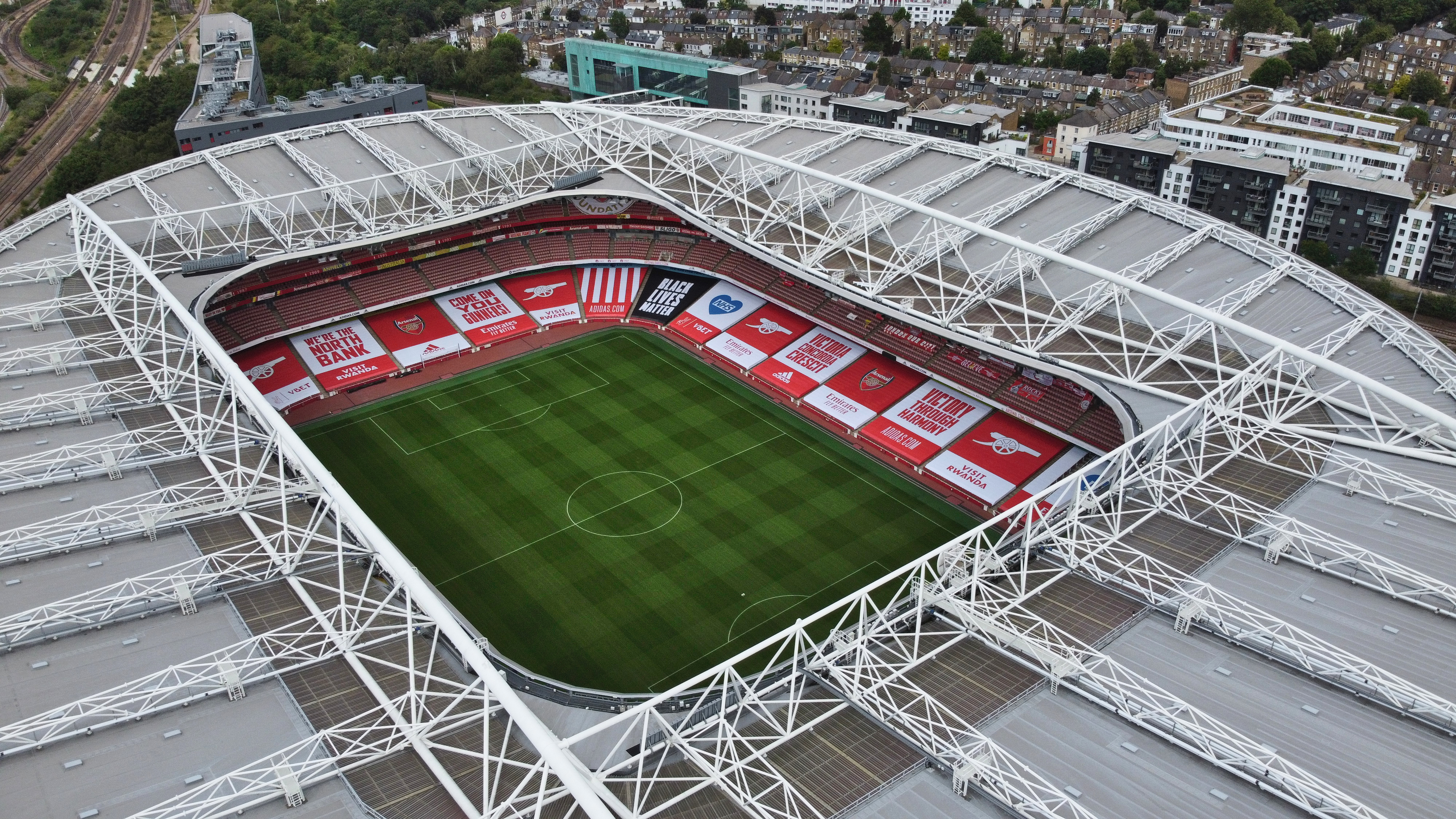
Competitive sport eventually resumed with games being played without spectators.

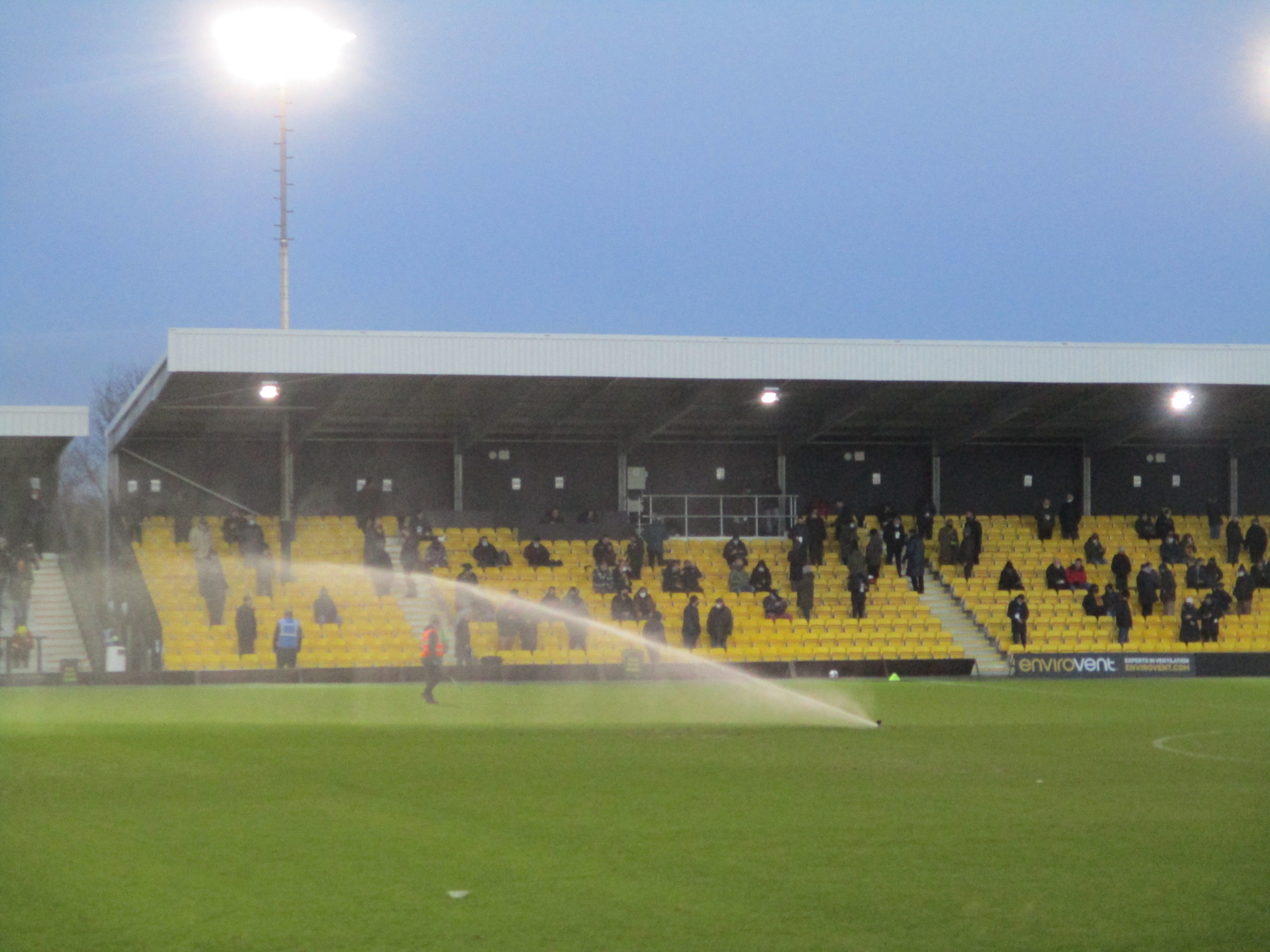
A socially distanced crowd at Wetherby Road watching Harrogate Town v Salford City in tier 2 (19 December 2020)

The Premier League suspended pre-match handshakes on 6 March. On 10 March, the Premier League match between Manchester City and Arsenal was postponed in light of confirmation that Nottingham Forest and Olympiacos owner Evangelos Marinakis had contracted the virus. Marinakis had met with several Arsenal players when the London side hosted Olympiacos in a Europa League round of 32 match. On 10 March the four-day National Hunt horse racing Cheltenham Festival took place with more than 250,000 people attending the four-day festival albeit with enhanced hygiene measures in place, as did the All England Open Badminton Championships in Birmingham the next day.

Six Day Manchester, Men's Curling World Championships, Gymnastics World Cup in Birmingham, Henley Royal Regatta, Mountain Bike World Cup leg in Fort William, London leg of the Diving world cup, MLB and NFL games due to be held in London, North West 200, The Hundred, Anniversary Games, RideLondon, Tour of Britain, The Women's Tour, 2020 Grand National meeting, The Open, The Grand National, Wimbledon and British grass court tennis events, the Boat Races, British motorcycle Grand Prix due to be held in Silverstone, and Wales Rally GB were all sporting events due to be held in the UK during 2020 that were cancelled.

The London Marathon, Edinburgh Marathon, World Snooker Championship, Snooker's Tour Championship were postponed, along with seasons in Football, Rugby League and Union, cricket, netball, darts, motorsport, horse racing and boxing events were postponed. and all motor racing events sanctioned by the national governing body Motorsport UK were suspended until May.

Liverpool FC's second leg Champions League last 16 match against Atlético Madrid went ahead, despite Spain being in partial lockdown. An investigation by Liverpool authorities was announced into whether there were any links between the match and coronavirus in the city. Angela McLean, deputy chief scientific adviser to the UK government said that the idea that the match could have significantly contributed to the spread of the virus was an interesting hypothesis.

It was also thought that the Cheltenham Festival may have accelerated the spread of coronavirus. There were calls from public health officials into why the festival was allowed to go ahead. Boris Johnson's attendance at the England v Wales Rugby Union match was cited as one of the reasons why the festival went ahead. The Government defended the festival organisers decision to go ahead with the meeting.

The Olympic Boxing Qualification tournament for European boxers was suspended after three days of competition. Several coaches and athletes who attended the event later tested positive and thought that they had caught COVID-19 from the event. The International Olympic Committee said that its boxing task force were not aware of any link between the event and the virus.

No sport was allowed to take place in England until 1 June. On 31 May 2020, the Department for Digital, Culture, Media and Sport (DCMS) announced the return of live competitive sport with the condition of being played with safety assured in terms of social distancing and a carefully controlled environment. According to the ruling, the sporting events will have no spectators in attendance and take place behind closed doors. The first competitive sport to be held in the UK since the suspension of events was Snooker's Championship League at the Marshall Arena in Milton Keynes.

In July it was announced that a trial of fans in attendance at events would happen. These included horse racing, cricket and snooker events. In the wake of several local lockdowns being implemented the trial of fans attending events was stopped at the beginning of August. Spectators had been present for the first day of the World Snooker Championship, with World Snooker Chairman Barry Hearn hoping that people would be allowed to watch the final. People had also attended the Goodwood Festival but were prevented to do so for the final day. Cricket matches involving Surrey and Middlesex and Warwickshire and Northamptonshire which would have had fans in attendance for the first two days were played behind close doors.

Spectators were allowed to attend the final of the World Snooker Championship with trails beginning again with a view for all sports to allow to have fans attend from the 1 October. On the 9 September the plan to allow fans back in October was placed under review, before a complete stop of the trial and abandoning of fans to return in October on 22 September. Rugby Union matches involving Bath and Gloucester and Bristol and Leicester and a horse racing meeting at Newmarket which were part of the trial would no longer have any attendees.
