= Glenys Stacey =

Dame Glenys Stacey DBE
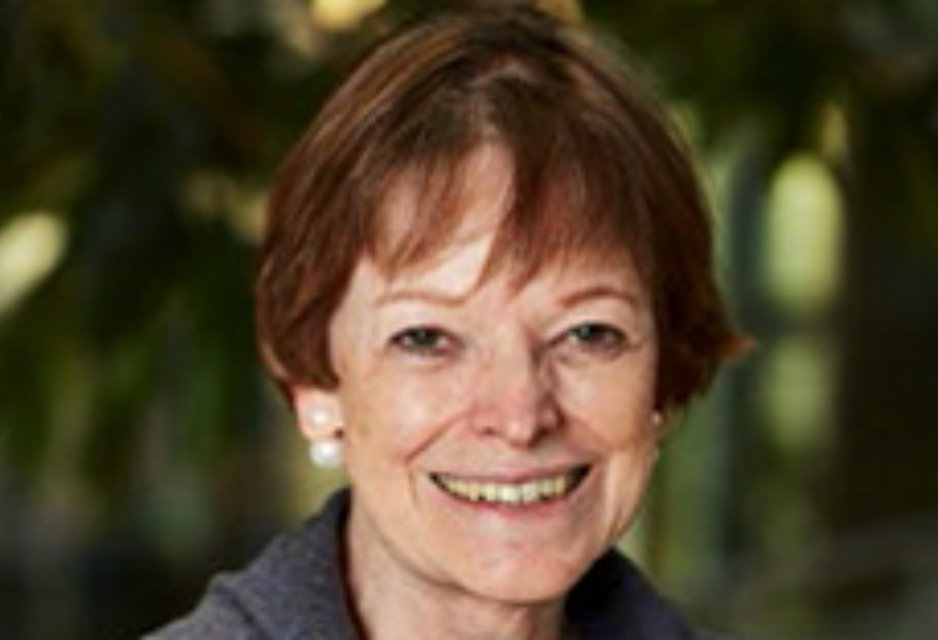

Chair of Office for Environmental Protection
- Incumbent
- Assumed office 1 February 2021
- Prime Minister: Boris Johnson
- Environment Secretary: George Eustice
- Preceded by: New role

Chief Regulator of Ofqual
- Interim; 26 August 2020 – 31 December 2020
- Prime Minister: Boris Johnson
- Education Secretary: Gavin Williamson
- Preceded by: Sally Collier
- Succeeded by: Simon Lebus (interim)
- In office 1 April 2012 – 29 February 2016
- Prime Minister: David Cameron
- Education Secretary: Michael Gove; Nicky Morgan
- Preceded by: Amanda Spielman
- Succeeded by: Amanda Spielman (interim)

CEO of Ofqual
- In office 1 March 2011 – 29 February 2016
- Prime Minister: David Cameron
- Education Secretary: Michael Gove; Nicky Morgan
- Preceded by: Isabel Nisbet
- Succeeded by: Sally Collier^{[a]}

Personal details
- Born: Walsall Wood
- a. Office vacant from 1 March to 24 April 2016

Dame Glenys Jean Stacey DBE (née McBride; born 1954) is a solicitor and civil servant serving as chair of the Office for Environmental Protection from February 2021. She was Chief Executive and Chief Regulator of Ofqual, acting in the post from August to December 2020, and previously from 2012 to 2016. Stacey also served as Her Majesty's Chief Inspector of Probation and led HM Inspectorate of Probation for England and Wales from 2016 and 2019.

She has worked in the public sector at senior management level since 2000. Previously she has worked as chief executive of Ofqual, of Standards for England, at Animal Health (now part of the Animal and Plant Health Agency), at the Greater Manchester Magistrates' Courts Committee (now part of HM Courts and Tribunals Service), and at the Criminal Cases Review Commission.

She was appointed Dame Commander of the Order of the British Empire (DBE) in the 2016 New Year Honours for services to education.

Stacey returned as Ofqual's chief regulator in an interim capacity on 26 August 2020 following the resignation of Sally Collier in connection with the 2020 UK GCSE and A-Level grading controversy.
