= Sally Collier =

British civil servant and former exam regulator of Ofqual

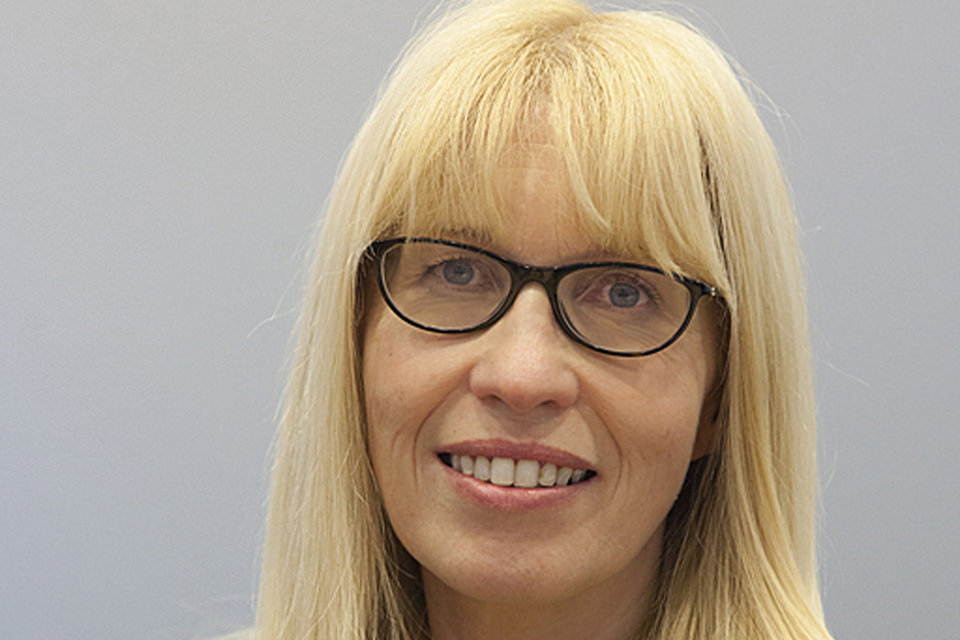

CEO and Chief Regulator of Ofqual
- In office 25 April 2016 – 25 August 2020
- Prime Minister: David Cameron; Theresa May; Boris Johnson
- Education Secretary: Nicky Morgan; Justine Greening; Damian Hinds; Gavin Williamson
- Preceded by: Amanda Spielman (interim)
- Succeeded by: Glenys Stacey (interim)

Sally Collier is a British civil servant and former head of the Office of Qualifications and Examinations Regulation (Ofqual). She also involved in negotiating changes to European Union rules governing public procurement.

== Career ==
She has served as the CEO of the Crown Commercial Service, an executive agency of the Cabinet Office. She was also previously the managing director of the Government Procurement Service and Director of Procurement Policy and Capability. On 25 April 2016 she was appointed as the chief regulator of Ofqual, replacing Glenys Stacey who stepped down from the position in February 2016 after a five-year term. Prior to her appointment as the exam regulator, she had nearly twenty years of experience in the civil service.

=== GCSE and A-Level grading controversy ===
In 2020, Collier was criticised over the implementation of the Ofqual exam results algorithm which was termed by teachers and students as unfair for the purpose of grading the students following the cancellation of the GCE Advanced Level (A Level) exams due to the COVID-19 pandemic. The algorithm used initially led to a downgrading of 40% of the A-Level results and was later removed. On 25 August 2020 she tendered her resignation from the position of chief regulator of Ofqual. She was later replaced by her predecessor as the chief regulator of Ofqual, Glenys Stacey, on an interim basis.
