= Bennett Memorial Diocesan School =

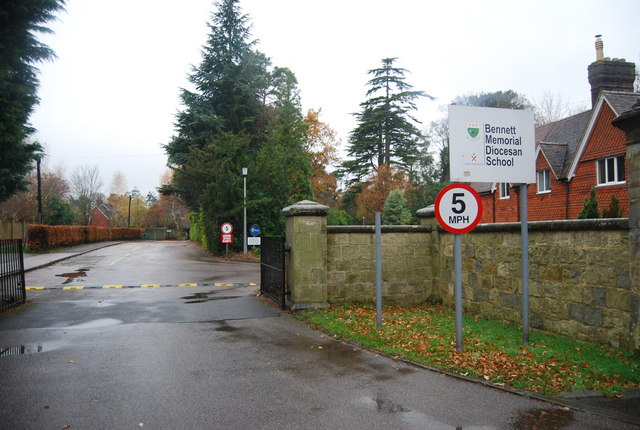

Location
- Culverden Down; Tunbridge Wells, Kent, TN4 9SH; England; 51°08′34″N 0°14′53″E

Information
- Type: Academy
- Motto: Semper Tenax (Ever holding fast)
- Religious affiliation: Church of England
- Established: 1951
- Founder: Lady Elena Bennett and Christopher Chavasse
- Local authority: Kent
- Department for Education URN: 136603 Tables
- Ofsted: Reports
- Headteacher: Karen Brookes
- Staff: 115
- Gender: Coeducational
- Age: 11-12 to 17-18
- Enrolment: 1865
- Houses: Audley; Chavasse; Fisher; Gundulf; Justus; Langdon; Merton; Ridley; Talbot; Warner
- Website: https://www.bennettmemorial.co.uk

Bennett Memorial Diocesan School is an all ability co-educational academy in Royal Tunbridge Wells, Kent, England, which caters for students from age 11 to 18.

== History ==
The school was founded on 17 October 1951 by Lady Elena Bennett of Matfield and Christopher M. Chavasse, Bishop of Rochester. Lady Bennett donated the funding for the school in memory of her late husband, Sir Thomas Bennett.

Lady Bennett designed the school’s coat of arms. The badger was chosen by Lady Bennett because her maiden name was Brooke-Jones (which reminded her of brock, a name for a badger) as well as often seeing badgers around the school site. She chose the school’s motto, Semper Tenax, because she believed the school would maintain Christian values.

The school opened to 400 students and 18 teachers on 8 January 1953. n 1960 the foundation stone for the chapel was laid by Bishop Chavasse. This is still outside the main hall at the chapel end. In 1967 Lady Bennett died, and her coffin was placed in the chapel for the students to visit. The third headteacher was Ann Scott, after whom the Ann Scott Wing is named. In 1976 Bennett became a comprehensive school, accepting students of all abilities from a large part of the Diocese of Rochester rather than just Tunbridge Wells. It was shortly after this time that the Bennett sixth form was opened for A-Level students. In 1993 Bennett accepted boys into Year 7.

Pupils from the school were chosen to form part of a "guard of honour" for athletes at the opening ceremony of the 2012 Olympic Games, displaying artistic creations their school made to celebrate the event.

In 2012, the school announced plans for a new sixth form centre. Construction of the Sixth Form Study Centre started in March 2013, and it opened to staff and students in January 2014. It was opened in February 2014 by the Education Secretary Michael Gove.

The 3G Pitch was built in 2017 so that rugby and football could be played in any weather conditions.

== Inspections by Ofsted ==
The school's first inspection by Ofsted after becoming an academy was in 2012, with a judgement of Outstanding. The school's second inspection was in 2023, again with a judgement of Outstanding.

== Notable alumni ==
- Douglas Booth, model and actor
- Joanne Rout, swimmer
- Scott Wagstaff, footballer
- Matt Weston, skeleton racer
- Jonny Williams, footballer

== Notable staff ==
Sir Ian Bauckham, head teacher 2004-2007, and executive head for several more, before becoming head of Ofqual.
