= Ian Bauckham =

British headteacher

Sir Ian Bauckham CBE
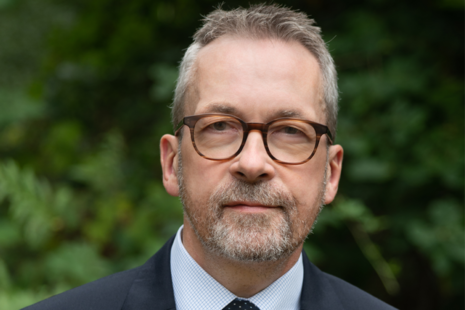

Chief Regulator of Qualifications and Examinations
- Incumbent
- Assumed office 1 January 2024
- Preceded by: Jo Saxton

Executive Chair, Ofqual
- In office 1 January 2021 – 1 January 2024
- Preceded by: Roger Taylor

Personal details
- Born: Ian Roger Bauckham; 7 March 1962 (age 64) Hornchurch, London, England
- Education: Downing College, Cambridge University of Nottingham Institute of Education Heythrop College, University of London

Sir Ian Roger Bauckham CBE (born 7 March 1962) is a British educator and public servant.

Born in Hornchurch in 1962, Bauckham was educated at Downing College, Cambridge where he read modern and mediæval languages, graduating in 1984, and then the University of Nottingham where he gained his PGCE in 1985. He subsequently took an MA in education at the Institute of Education of the University of London in 1994, and an MA in philosophy at Heythrop College, University of London in 1997.

Bauckham served as President of the Association of School and College Leaders for 2013–14. As of December 2022, Bauckham was Headteacher of Bennett Memorial Diocesan School for a few years and for several years, the CEO of the Tenax Schools academy trust since 2015, and serves on the board of Ofqual since March 2018 and as its executive chair since January 2021.

Bauckham was appointed a Commander of the Order of British Empire "for services to Education" in the 2017 Birthday Honours, and was knighted in the 2023 New Year Honours, with the same citation.

He was appointed CEO and Chief Regulator of Ofqual with effect from 1 January 2024.
