= 2020 United Kingdom school exam grading controversy =

Qualification grading controversy

Due to the COVID-19 pandemic in the United Kingdom, all secondary education examinations due to be held in 2020 were cancelled. As a result, an alternative method had to be designed and implemented at short notice to determine the qualification grades to be awarded to students for that year. A standardisation algorithm was produced in June 2020 by the regulator Ofqual in England, Qualifications Wales in Wales, Scottish Qualifications Authority in Scotland, and CCEA in Northern Ireland. The algorithm was designed to combat grade inflation, and was to be used to moderate the existing but unpublished centre-assessed grades for A-level and GCSE students. After the A-level grades were issued, and after criticism, Ofqual, with the support of HM Government, withdrew these grades. It issued all students the Centre Assessed Grades (CAGs), which had been produced by teachers as part of the process. The same ruling was applied to the awarding of GCSE grades, just a few days before they were issued: CAG-based grades were the ones released on results day.

A similar controversy erupted in Scotland, after the Scottish Qualifications Authority marked down as many as 75,000 predicted grades to "maintain credibility", and later agreed to upgrade the results and issue new exam certificates. The Scottish Government apologised for the controversy, with Nicola Sturgeon, the First Minister of Scotland saying of the situation that the Scottish Government "did not get it right".

== Background ==
In England, Wales and Northern Ireland, students sit General Certificate of Secondary Education (GCSE) and A-level exams, typically at ages 16 and 18 respectively. Similar but equivalent international versions of these qualifications are offered by UK exam boards.

On 18 March 2020, the government decided to cancel all examinations in England due to the COVID-19 pandemic, although the regulator, Ofqual, had advised that holding exams in a socially distanced manner was the best option. The same cancellation decision was taken by the Scottish, Welsh and Northern Ireland devolved governments. The governments announced that, in their place, grades were to be based on teacher predictions which would be moderated to prevent grade inflation. Overseas exams provided by CIE were cancelled on 23 March 2020, and grades were issued on the same basis as in England.

Secretary of State for Education Gavin Williamson stated that his "priority now is to ensure no young person faces a barrier when it comes to moving on to the next stage of their lives – whether that's further or higher education, an apprenticeship or a job" and that he had "asked exam boards to work closely with the teachers who know their pupils best to ensure their hard work and dedication is rewarded and fairly recognised." Students unhappy with their calculated grades would be able to appeal through their school, or sit exams in the autumn.

For homeschooled students, or those retaking exams, Ofqual stated they may not receive a grade, and would have to sit exams in 2021 because of a "lack of any credible alternatives identified". It was estimated that over 20,000 students would be affected, and would be unable to move on to college or university.

== Standardisation algorithm ==
A grades standardisation algorithm was produced by Ofqual, the regulator of qualifications, exams and tests in England. It was designed to combat grade inflation, and was to be used to standardise or moderate the teacher-predicted grades for A Level and GCSE qualifications.

== A-level results ==
The A-level grades were announced in England, Wales and Northern Ireland on 13 August 2020. Nearly 36% were one grade lower than teachers' predictions and 3% were down two grades. By comparison, 79% of university entrants in 2019 did not achieve their predicted grades.

=== Reaction ===
The release of results resulted in a public outcry. Particular criticism was made of the disparate effect the grading algorithm had in downgrading the results of those who attended state schools, and upgrading the results of pupils at privately funded independent schools and thus disadvantaging pupils of a lower socio-economic background, in part due to the algorithm's behaviour around small cohort sizes, and resulting in private schools seeing a bigger yearly increase in the proportion of students getting As and A*s than others.

Students and teachers felt deprived and upset following the controversial algorithm calculation and protested against it, with many demanding Prime Minister Boris Johnson and his government take immediate action. In response to the public outcry, on 15 August, Gavin Williamson said that the grading system is here to stay, and there will be "no U-turn, no change". Williamson criticised Scottish ministers for their u-turn the week prior, stating that awarding unmoderated grades would be "unwise", cause "rampant grade inflation". Instead, he suggested that schools appeal swiftly on behalf of affected students, to ensure any errors could be amended. Boris Johnson stated that the results are "robust and dependable".

Legal action, in the form of judicial review, was initiated by multiple students and legal advocacy organisations such as the Good Law Project.

=== A-level results revised ===
On 17 August, Ofqual and Secretary of State for Education Gavin Williamson agreed that grades would be reissued using unmoderated teacher predictions. As a result, there was an annual increase by more than 10 percentage points in the number of top grades awarded (from 25.2% to an estimated 37.7%), the biggest increase for at least 20 years.

The initial algorithm 'upgraded' students, leading 100,000 to secure their firm university choices, which filled courses at top universities. The switch to teacher-assessed grades meant that a further 15,000, who at first missed their firm offers, then met their grade requirements. This caused a capacity issue that meant that some oversubscribed universities, such as Durham University, had to offer incentives for students to defer their place to the following academic year. Incentives from Durham included money and a guarantee of accommodation choice.

== GCSE results ==
On 20 August 2020 the GCSE results were released. After the problems arising from the use of the grade algorithm for A-levels, it was decided that GCSE grades awarded to each student would be the higher of the teacher predicted result or algorithm standardised result for each subject they took.

== Vocational and technical qualifications (BTEC) results ==
A further 200,000 students who had taken the level one and two vocational qualifications were told on 19 August 2020, hours before results day, that they would not receive them on time. About 250,000 level-three grades, which had already been awarded, were also reassessed; these vocational equivalents to A-levels had been given a result at the same time as the A-levels were released. The examining board, Pearson Edexcel, withdrew them when the controversy broke, and has re-marked them upwards and is issuing a revised certificate, on a rolling basis, in the week beginning 24 August.

== Aftermath ==
Resignations in the aftermath of the controversy

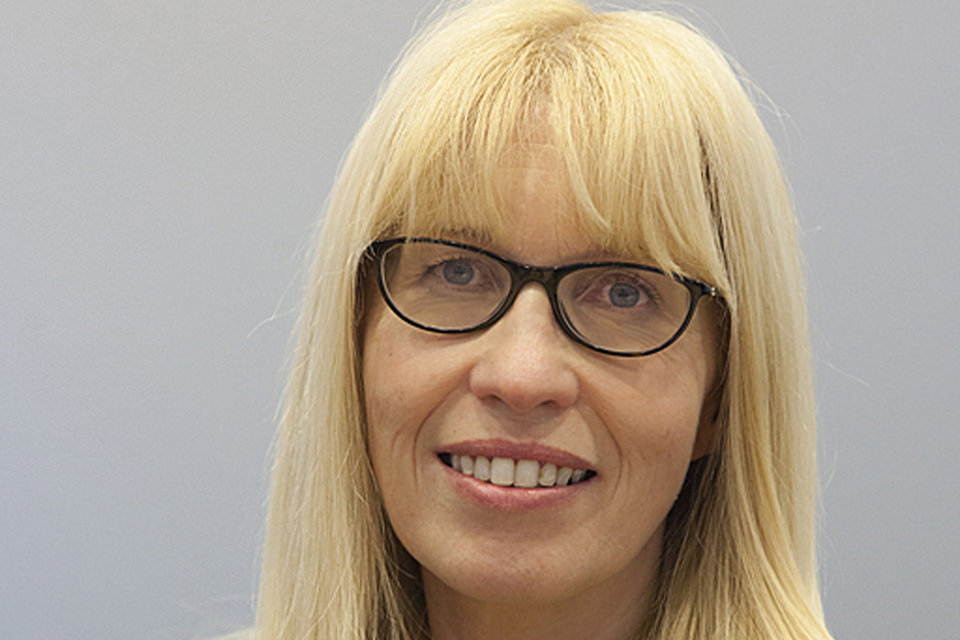
Sally Collier, CEO and Chief Regulator of Ofqual

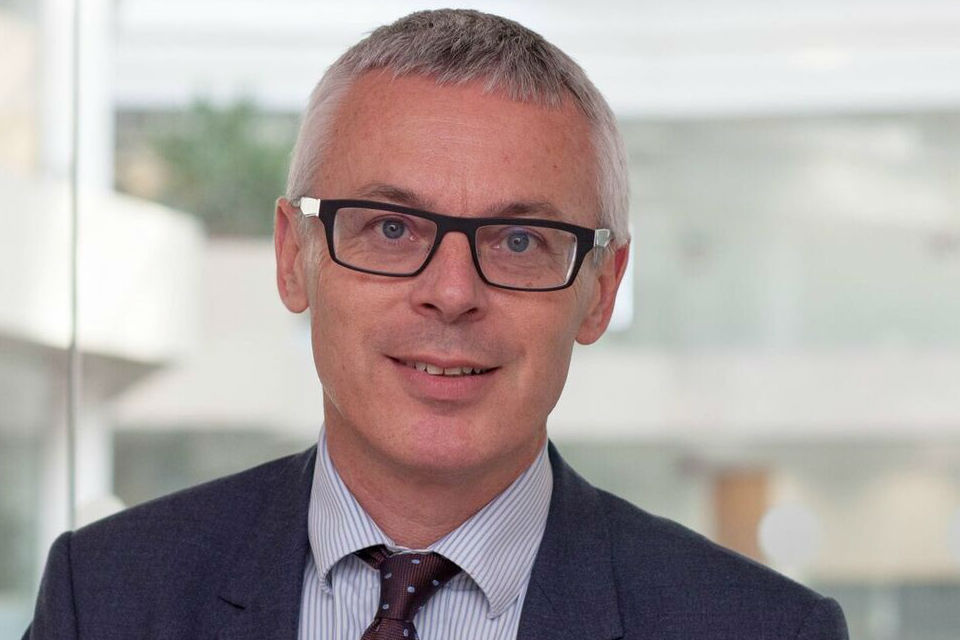
Jonathan Slater, Permanent Secretary of the Department for Education

On 25 August 2020, Sally Collier resigned from the position of chief regulator of Ofqual following the grading controversy. Three days later, Permanent Secretary Jonathan Slater, the most senior civil servant at the Department for Education (DfE), stood down. Subsequently, the government was accused of scapegoating civil servants and avoiding accountability.

On 1 September, the question of blame was reopened by The Guardian, which reported that OCR, one of the exam boards, told Williamson that the algorithm was producing some rogue results. But Williamson and the DfE were told by Ofqual that the appeals procedure would correct the few rogue results. OCR informed them that this was more than a few results and that patterns could be observed, such as students with better results than a low-performing group the year before.

On 2 September, Ofqual's chair Roger Taylor appeared before the Education Select Committee of the House of Commons during their inquiry into the impact of COVID-19 on education and children's services. He apologised to students, parents and teachers, and stated that the Secretary of State made the decisions to cancel examinations and to abruptly withdraw the procedure to challenge calculated A-level grades.

In October 2025, whilst speaking at the UK COVID-19 Inquiry, Boris Johnson (who was Prime Minister during the pandemic) remarked he had been left feeling in a "homicidal mood" as a result of the exam grading scandal and regretted the impact his policies during the pandemic had on children and that he had considered sacking his-then Education Secretary Gavin Williamson as a result of the scandal. Furthermore, Johnson would also say the "wrong initial model" had been used to grade students.

== Scottish Highers ==
On 4 August 2020, secondary school students in Scotland received their Higher grades. Having also been unable to take their exams because of the pandemic, their grades were estimated by teachers, but the body awarding the qualifications was reported to have downgraded around a quarter of the marks awarded in order to "maintain credibility". Following criticism of the system from teachers and students, on 10 August, First Minister Nicola Sturgeon apologised for the controversy, saying the Scottish Government "did not get it right". The following day, on 11 August, the Scottish Government agreed to upgrade thousands of exam results, and accept teachers' estimates of pupils' results. On 18 August, the Scottish Qualifications Authority announced that 75,000 new exam certificates would be issued.

== See also ==
- 2000 SQA examinations controversy (Scotland)
- 2020 AP exams controversy (United States and other countries)
- Impact of the COVID-19 pandemic on education in the United Kingdom
- Government by algorithm
- Impact of the COVID-19 pandemic on education
- Social impact of the COVID-19 pandemic in the United Kingdom
