= Ofqual =

United Kingdom Government department

Office of Qualifications and Examinations Regulation

Agency overview
- Formed: 8 April 2008 (part of QCA); 1 April 2010 (independent)
- Preceding agency: QCA
- Type: Non-ministerial government department
- Jurisdiction: England
- Headquarters: Earlsdon Park, Coventry; 52°24′22.2″N 1°31′26.5″W
- Employees: 192 (2017/18)
- Annual budget: £17.5 million (2018/19)
- Agency executives: Sir Ian Bauckham, CEO and chief regulator; Susan Tranter, chair
- Website: www.gov.uk/ofqual

- Applies to: England
- Relates to: Qualifications

Other UK counterparts
- Northern Ireland: Council for the Curriculum, Examinations & Assessment
- Scotland: Qualifications Scotland
- Wales: Qualifications Wales

The Office of Qualifications and Examinations Regulation (Ofqual) is a non-ministerial government department that regulates qualifications, exams and tests in England. Colloquially and publicly, Ofqual is often referred to as the exam "watchdog".

== History ==
Ofqual was established in interim form on 8 April 2008 as part of the Qualifications and Curriculum Authority (QCA), taking over the regulatory functions that had previously been undertaken by the QCA directly through its regulation and standards division. It was always intended that Ofqual would be an entirely separate body from the QCA. This was achieved on 1 April 2010, when Ofqual was established as a non-ministerial government department under the Apprenticeships, Skills, Children and Learning Act 2009.

In 2020, Ofqual was involved in an GCSE and A-Level grading controversy during the COVID-19 pandemic.

== Role ==
Ofqual's role is "to maintain standards and confidence in qualifications."

=== Area of governance ===
Ofqual regulates exams, qualifications and tests in England. In Northern Ireland, Wales and Scotland, these matters are the responsibility of the respective national governments.

Scotland’s regulator, the Scottish Qualifications Authority, is also an awarding body, and is accredited by Ofqual for the delivery of qualifications in England.

Ofqual collaborates closely with the Department for Education in the UK government on general qualifications, such as GCSEs and A levels, and with the Department for Business, Innovation and Skills on vocational qualifications such as NVQs and BTECs. In Northern Ireland, Ofqual regulated NVQs on behalf of the Department for Employment and Learning until May 2016; this responsibility has since been transferred to the Council for the Curriculum, Examinations and Assessment.

Ofqual regulates and accredits English examination boards offering GCSEs and GCE A Levels, while the Joint Council for Qualifications regulates the actual administration of GCSE and GCE A Level examinations.

=== Modular versus linear syllabi ===
The Conservative Party under Prime Minister David Cameron initiated reforms for A Levels to change from the current modular to a linear structure. British examination boards (Edexcel, AQA, OCR and WJEC) regulated and accredited by Ofqual responded to the government's reform announcements by modifying syllabi of several A Level subjects. However, in 2014 the Labour Party announced that it would halt and reverse the reforms and maintain the modular A-Level system if it got into government. The universities of Oxford and Cambridge have expressed support for the modular system.

Recent reports reveal that the linear examination approach and the toughening educational reforms initiated by Ofqual provoked many schools to "play the system" by requesting test remarking and supplementary aid for students (e.g. special consideration and extra time) in order to uphold high exam grade levels so as to not drop in league tables.

Rising numbers of students taking GCSEs and GCE A Levels over the past decades has led to an increase in the quantity of examination results being enquired for re-marking and reported to Ofqual.

Ofqual's remit and responsibilities are established in law by the Apprenticeships, Skills, Children and Learning Act 2009 and the Education Act 2011. As a Non-ministerial department Ofqual is accountable to Parliament, through the Education Select Committee. It is not accountable to government ministers and is independent from ministerial government. Whereas Ofqual regulates and accredits British examination boards (e.g. Edexcel, AQA, OCR etc.) and their GCSE and GCE A-Level specifications; the examination board CAIE (Cambridge Assessment International Education) which offers international GCSEs and GCE A-Levels predominantly for schools outside the United Kingdom operates independently without British governmental intervention. Therefore, although CAIE qualifications are accredited by Ofqual, they are not regulated by it and thus may differ significantly in subject content and exam structure from UK GCSEs and GCE A-Levels.

== Structure ==
Ofqual has four directorates:

- Standards, research and analysis
- Vocational and technical qualifications
- General qualifications
- Regulatory and corporate services

=== Chief regulator ===
The chief regulator is the leader and figurehead of Ofqual.

Originally, the chief regulator was also the chair of Ofqual. When the chief regulator position was vacant during 2010 and 2011, the Deputy Chair, Dame Sandra Burslem, took on 'many of the responsibilities', though was never formally named chief regulator or chair.

On 1 April 2012, in line with the Education Act 2011, the chief regulator role transferred from the chair, to the chief executive. When the chief regulator post was vacant in 2016, the chair acted as the interim chief regulator.

- Kathleen Tattersall, 8 April 2008 – 2 July 2010
- Amanda Spielman, 14 July 2011 – 31 March 2012 (continued as chair without chief regulator role)
- Dame Glenys Stacey, 1 April 2012 – 29 February 2016
- Amanda Spielman, 1 March 2016 – 24 April 2016 (interim chief regulator)
- Sally Collier, 25 April 2016 – 25 August 2020
- Dame Glenys Stacey, 26 August 2020 – 31 December 2020 (interim chief regulator)
- Simon Lebus, 1 January 2021 – 17 September 2021 (interim chief regulator)
- Jo Saxton, 18 September 2021 – December 2023
- Sir Ian Bauckham, January 2024

=== Chair of Ofqual ===
Until 31 March 2012, the chair of Ofqual was also the chief regulator. When the chair position was vacant during 2010 and 2011, the deputy chair, Dame Sandra Burslem, 'stepped in to provide continuity', though was never formally named chair or chief regulator.

- Kathleen Tattersall, 8 April 2008 – 2 July 2010
- Amanda Spielman, 14 July 2011 – 30 November 2016
- Julius Weinberg, 1 December 2016 – 31 December 2016 (interim chair)
- Roger Taylor, 1 January 2017 – 31 December 2020
- Sir Ian Bauckham, 1 January 2021 – present (interim chair to January 2022, then chair)
- Frances Wadsworth, 19 December 2023 – present (interim chair)

=== Chief executive of Ofqual ===
- Isabel Nisbet, 8 April 2008 – 28 February 2011
- Dame Glenys Stacey, 1 March 2011 – 31 March 2012 (continued as CEO and chief regulator)

On 1 April 2012, the position of chief executive ceased to exist as an independent role when it was merged with the post of chief regulator.
