= Gavin Williamson =

British politician (born 1976)

The Right Honourable Sir Gavin Williamson CBE MP
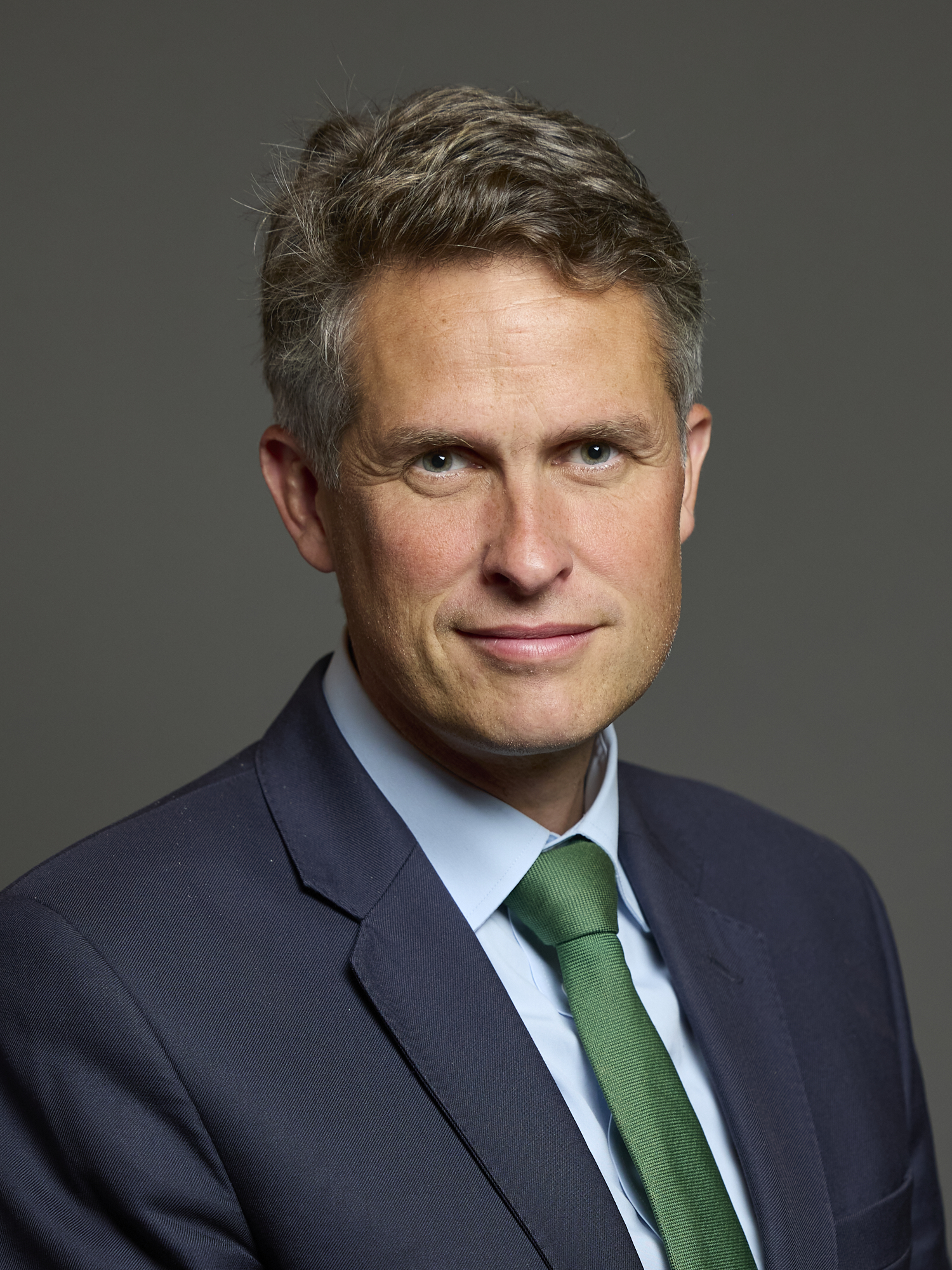
- Official portrait, 2024

Minister of State without Portfolio
- In office 25 October 2022 – 8 November 2022
- Prime Minister: Rishi Sunak
- Preceded by: Nigel Adams
- Succeeded by: Esther McVey

Secretary of State for Education
- In office 24 July 2019 – 15 September 2021
- Prime Minister: Boris Johnson
- Preceded by: Damian Hinds
- Succeeded by: Nadhim Zahawi

Secretary of State for Defence
- In office 2 November 2017 – 1 May 2019
- Prime Minister: Theresa May
- Preceded by: Sir Michael Fallon
- Succeeded by: Penny Mordaunt

Government Chief Whip in the House of Commons Parliamentary Secretary to the Treasury
- In office 14 July 2016 – 2 November 2017
- Prime Minister: Theresa May
- Preceded by: Mark Harper
- Succeeded by: Julian Smith

Member of Parliament
- Incumbent
- Assumed office 4 July 2024
- Preceded by: Constituency established
- Constituency: Stone, Great Wyrley and Penkridge
- Majority: 5,466 (12.8%)
- In office 6 May 2010 – 30 May 2024
- Preceded by: Patrick Cormack
- Succeeded by: Constituency abolished
- Constituency: South Staffordshire

Personal details
- Born: Gavin Alexander Williamson; 25 June 1976 (age 50) Scarborough, North Yorkshire, England
- Party: Conservative
- Spouse: Joanne Eland (m. 2001)
- Children: 2
- Education: University of Bradford (BSc)
- Website: gavinwilliamson.org

Sir Gavin Alexander Williamson (born 25 June 1976) is a British politician who served in various Cabinet positions under Prime Ministers Theresa May, Boris Johnson and Rishi Sunak between 2016 and 2022. A member of the Conservative Party, he has been the Member of Parliament (MP) for Stone, Great Wyrley and Penkridge, formerly South Staffordshire, since 2010. Williamson previously served as Government Chief Whip from 2016 to 2017 and Secretary of State for Defence from 2017 to 2019 under May, as Secretary of State for Education from 2019 to 2021 under Johnson, and as Minister of State without Portfolio in 2022 under Sunak.

Williamson was born in Scarborough, North Yorkshire, and was educated at Raincliffe School, Scarborough Sixth Form College and the University of Bradford. He was chair of a Conservative student body from 1997 to 1998. He served on the North Yorkshire County Council from 2001 to 2005. In the 2005 general election, he stood to become MP for Blackpool North and Fleetwood, without success. Williamson was elected as MP for South Staffordshire at the 2010 general election. He served in David Cameron's governments as Parliamentary Private Secretary to the Secretary of State for Transport, aiding Patrick McLoughlin, prior to being appointed Parliamentary Private Secretary to the Prime Minister in October 2013.

Following Cameron's resignation, Williamson supported Theresa May's bid to become Conservative leader; May appointed Williamson as Chief Whip in her first government in July 2016. He later served as Secretary of State for Defence from November 2017 to May 2019, when he was dismissed following a leak from the National Security Council; Williamson denied leaking the information about Huawei's potential involvement in the British 5G network. After supporting Boris Johnson's campaign to succeed May as Conservative leader, Williamson returned to the cabinet as Secretary of State for Education in July 2019. He served in the role during the early part of the COVID-19 pandemic, including times when schools were closed to most children, and was criticised for the 2020 school exam grading controversy. In September 2021, he was dismissed as Education Secretary when Johnson reshuffled his cabinet. He was subsequently nominated by Johnson for a knighthood, which he obtained in March 2022.

Williamson supported Rishi Sunak in his two attempts to become Conservative leader; following Sunak's election in October 2022, he appointed Williamson as Minister of State without Portfolio. In November 2022 Williamson resigned, stating he wanted to clear his name "of any wrongdoing" in relation to allegations, which he "strenuously denied", of his having bullied former Chief Whip Wendy Morton and of bullying behaviour previously during his own tenure as Chief Whip and as Defence Secretary.

== Early life and career ==
Williamson was born in Scarborough, North Yorkshire.His father Ray was a local government worker, and his mother Beverly worked in a job centre. They were both Labour Party voters. He attended East Ayton Primary School and for his secondary education, Raincliffe School, a comprehensive. He studied A-Levels in History, Economics, and Government and Politics at Scarborough Sixth Form College. From 1994 to 1997, he completed a BSc in Social Sciences from the University of Bradford.

Williamson was national chair of Conservative Students in 1997, the penultimate chair before it was merged into Conservative Future in 1998. As chair he accused the National Union of Students (NUS) of acting like a "branch of the Labour Party". In 2001, he was elected as the Conservative county councillor for Seamer division in North Yorkshire. In 2003, he was appointed as the County Council's "Young People's Champion". He did not stand for re-election in 2005. Williamson is a former deputy chairman of Staffordshire Area Conservatives, chairman of Stoke-on-Trent Conservative Association and vice-chairman of Derbyshire Dales Conservative Association.

Williamson worked as a manager in fireplace manufacturer Elgin & Hall, a subsidiary of AGA, until 2004. By 2005, Williamson had become managing director of Aynsley China, a Staffordshire-based pottery firm. It sold ceramic tableware. He later became co-owner. In April 2005, Williamson was quoted in reports on the consumer rush to buy items with the wrong wedding date on for Charles and Camilla's wedding. He told The Daily Telegraph, "We've literally had fights in our own retail shops. On the first day after the announcement I went into our factory shop in Stoke-on-Trent and we had people fighting over the last plate that we had on the shop floor. I think everybody has decided that this is going to be their pension."

He has also worked for NPS North West Limited, an architectural design firm, until he became an MP in 2010.

In the 2005 general election, he stood unsuccessfully as the Conservative Party candidate in Blackpool North and Fleetwood. After 2005, Williamson moved to Derbyshire.

== Parliamentary career ==
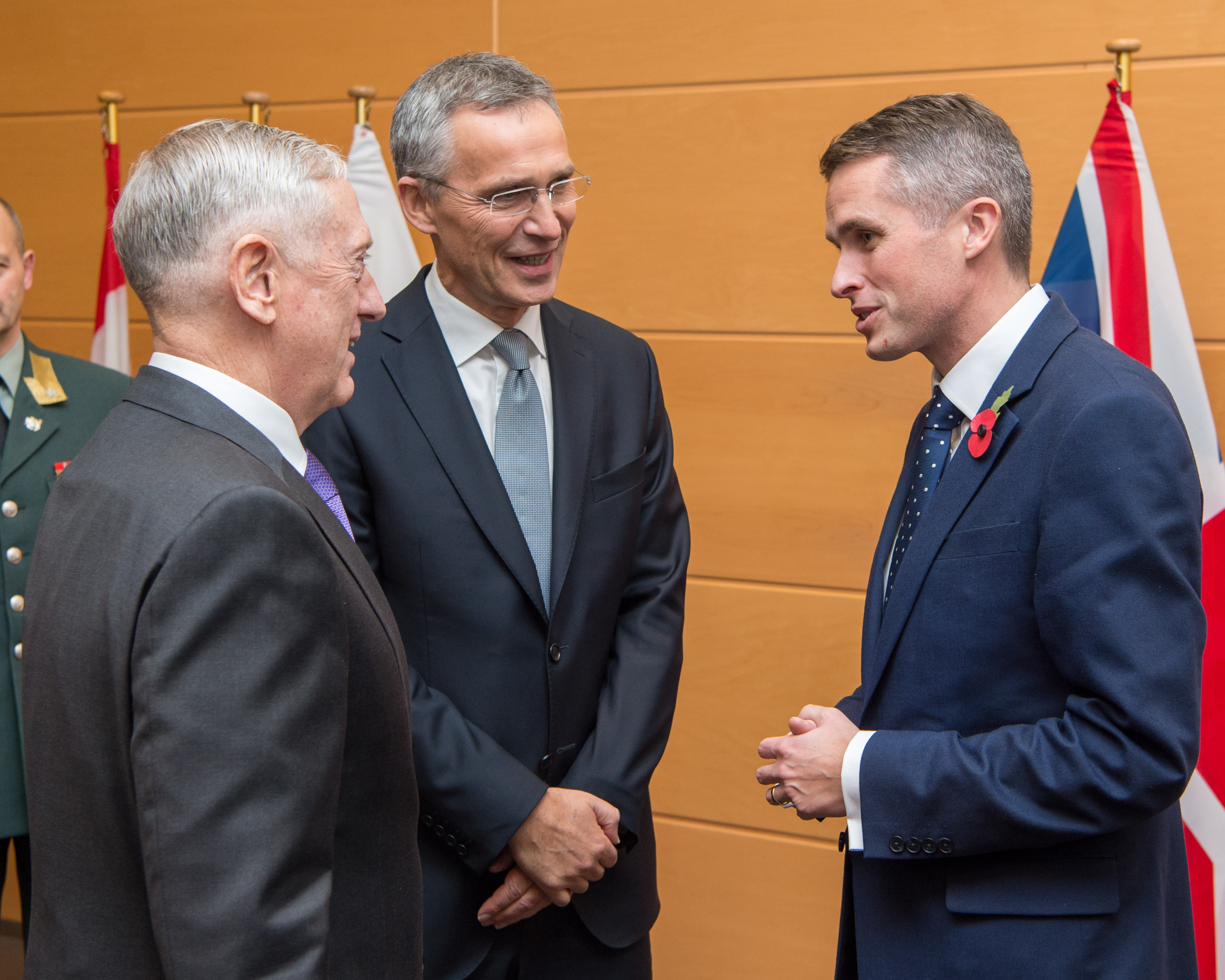
Williamson (right) meets with US Secretary of Defense Jim Mattis and NATO Secretary General Jens Stoltenberg in Brussels in November 2017

=== Early parliamentary career (2010–2011) ===
In January 2010, Williamson was selected as the Conservative candidate in South Staffordshire for the 2010 general election. The incumbent, Patrick Cormack, had announced that he was retiring. The selection went to five ballots, but in the end Williamson won over local councillor Robert Light in the final ballot. Williamson was subsequently elected with a majority of 16,590 votes. Shortly after being elected, he cited his political inspiration as Rab Butler and, when asked what department of any he would most like to lead, he said the Department for Business, Innovation and Skills as it is "business and manufacturing that can lead the way out of difficult economic times".

Williamson made his maiden speech on 8 June 2010, on the same day as Nicky Morgan and Kwasi Kwarteng. During his speech, he said that "We do not sing enough the praises of our designers, engineers and manufacturers. We need to change that ethos and have a similar one to that of Germany or Japan. We will have a truly vibrant economy only when we recreate the Victorian spirit of ingenuity and inventiveness that made Britain such a vibrant country, as I am sure it will be again." Williamson campaigned on a number of issues in his first year in Parliament.

In July 2010, Williamson called for a new law to allow local authorities to clamp down on car boot sales that disrupted traffic flow, citing villages in his constituency as examples. In June 2011, he expressed support for postwoman Julie Roberts, who had been suspended after clinging for over a mile onto the bonnet of her post van that had been stolen. He said that "People want her back in work and they want the Royal Mail to show some common sense and some common decency" and asked the Royal Mail to reinstate her into her old job. Williamson was one of several MPs who was absent or abstained on 21 March 2011 vote on supporting UN-backed action in Libya. The vote ultimately passed 557–13.

=== Parliamentary Private Secretary (2011–2016) ===
In October 2011, Williamson was appointed as Parliamentary private secretary to the minister of state for Northern Ireland, Hugo Swire. He replaced Conor Burns, who became Owen Paterson's new PPS. In September 2012, Williamson became PPS to Patrick McLoughlin, Secretary of State for Transport, and in 2013 became PPS to the prime minister, David Cameron.

In Parliament, Williamson was a member of the Northern Ireland Affairs Select Committee and was Chair of the All Party Parliamentary Group on Motor Neurone Disease.

Williamson supported the United Kingdom's remain campaign during the 2016 EU membership referendum.

=== Chief Whip (2016–2017) ===
Following David Cameron's resignation, Williamson "privately vowed" to stop the front-runner Boris Johnson from becoming Conservative Party leader. He assessed Theresa May to be the likeliest candidate to defeat Johnson, offered his help to her, and was invited to be her parliamentary campaign manager. When May became prime minister, Williamson was appointed Chief Whip.

Following the Conservative–DUP agreement after the 2017 general election, Williamson visited Belfast to discuss arrangements with the DUP.

=== Defence Secretary (2017–2019) ===
Williamson was appointed Secretary of State for Defence on 2 November 2017 after the resignation of Sir Michael Fallon the preceding evening.

In February 2018, Williamson dined with Lubov Chernukhin, the wife of a former Putin minister, in exchange for a £30,000 donation to the Conservative party. Later that month, Williamson alleged that the leader of the Labour Party, Jeremy Corbyn, in meeting a Czech diplomat (later revealed to be a spy) during the 1980s, had "betray[ed]" his country. In response to the statement, a spokesman for Corbyn stated: "Gavin Williamson should focus on his job and not give credence to entirely false and ridiculous smears".

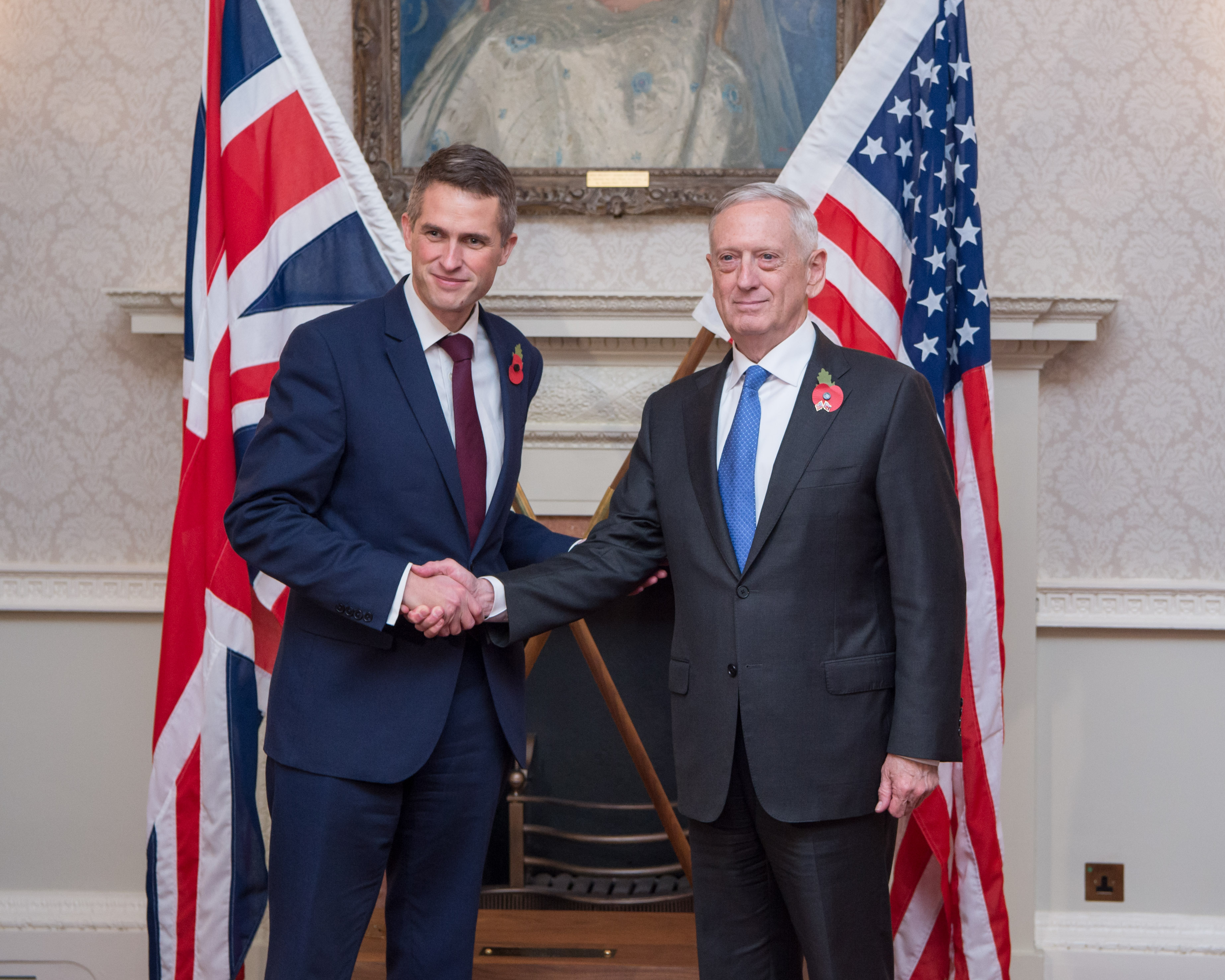
Williamson meeting with United States Secretary of Defense, Jim Mattis in 2017

Williamson has supported the Saudi Arabian-led military intervention in Yemen against the Shia Houthis despite concerns from human rights activists and Labour MPs about war crimes allegedly committed by the Saudi military.

On 15 March 2018, in the wake of the Salisbury poisoning, Williamson answered a question about Russia's potential response to the UK's punitive measures against Russia by saying that "frankly, Russia should go away, and it should shut up". Major-General Igor Konashenkov, the spokesman of the Russian Defence Ministry, said: "The market wench talk that British defence secretary Gavin Williamson resorted to reflects his extreme intellectual impotency". Williamson's remark was quoted by the president of Ukraine, Petro Poroshenko, who posted a comment on his official Twitter account: "The Kremlin's 'chemical attack' in the UK is nothing but an encroachment on British sovereignty. And our message to Russia is the same as that of British defense secretary Gavin Williamson: 'shut up and go away'."

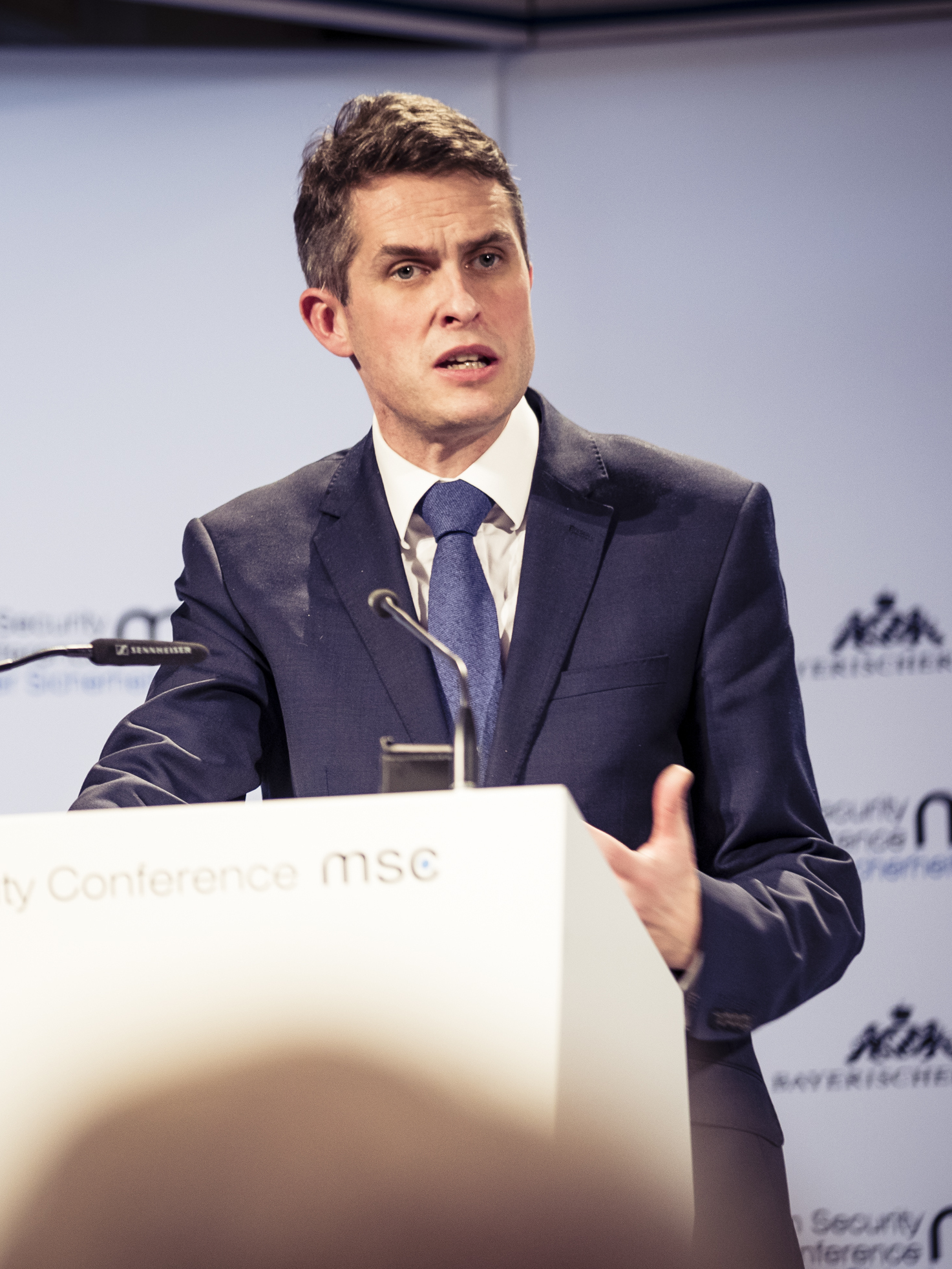
Williamson during the MSC 2019

In December 2018, Williamson expressed "grave" and "very deep concerns" about the Chinese telecommunications company Huawei providing technology to upgrade Britain's services to 5G. He accused China of acting "sometimes in a malign way". China's Defence Ministry spokesman Wu Qian criticised Williamson's comments, saying: "The remarks just reinforced the deep-rooted ignorance, prejudice and anxiety among some British people."

On 11 February 2019, Williamson delivered the speech "Defence in Global Britain" at the Royal United Services Institute outlining the future direction of the British armed forces. The speech, among other things, outlined plans to send Britain's new aircraft carrier to the Pacific; the Chinese Government in turn cancelled trade talks with Chancellor of the Exchequer Philip Hammond and prompted Hammond to state that the decision to deploy the aircraft carrier was premature. The Mail on Sunday quoted an unnamed ally of Hammond comparing Williamson to Private Pike, a hapless character in the television sitcom Dad's Army.

On 1 May 2019, Williamson was asked to resign from his position as Defence Secretary, following the leaking of confidential National Security Council information related to Huawei's potential involvement in the UK's 5G network. He refused to resign because he felt this would incriminate him and be seen as an admission that he was responsible for the leak, and was therefore sacked. Theresa May said that she had "compelling evidence" that Williamson had leaked the information and that she had "lost confidence in his ability to serve in his role". Williamson vehemently denied the allegation, saying that he "swore on his children's lives he was not responsible", and said that a "thorough and formal inquiry" would have vindicated his position. At the time, opposition MPs called for a police investigation into the matter, but the matter was closed.

On 10 November 2022, The Guardian reported that when Penny Mordaunt was defence secretary she had to deal with a security leak, and the department believed her predecessor, Williamson, caused the leak. There were fears the leak could put "our people's lives at risk". Three sources told The Guardian that the leak was considered so serious Mordaunt was ready to look for a D notice to warn media that publishing the information could endanger Britain's national security. Williamson denied leaking the second serious alleged leak. A former government insider said senior Ministry of Defence figures believed at the time that the leak "could only have come from Gavin" and "our people's lives were put at risk by it". They would not discuss the details about the alleged leak, for the same security reasons.

=== Boris Johnson Conservative leadership campaign (2019) ===
Williamson worked on Boris Johnson's campaign during the 2019 Conservative Party leadership election.

=== Education Secretary (2019–2021) ===
Williamson became Secretary of State for Education following Boris Johnson's appointment as Prime Minister on 24 July 2019.

Following deplatforming of history professor Selina Todd and former Home Secretary Amber Rudd by student societies at Oxford University, in March 2020 Williamson called for "robust action" to enforce free speech codes, and stated that the government would intervene to protect freedom of speech at universities if they failed to do so themselves. HuffPost reported that Williamson's department had drafted legislation to "strengthen academic freedom and free speech in universities". Williamson brought forward the legislation, titled the Higher Education (Freedom of Speech) Bill, in May 2021.

Early in the COVID-19 pandemic, the Prime Minister announced schools in England were to be closed to most children from 20 March 2020 until further notice. He said that exams in that academic year would not go ahead. On 6 January 2021, Williamson announced GCSE, AS and A-Level exams would once again not go ahead for students in the academic year, being replaced with teacher assessed grades.

On 15 September 2021, Williamson was dismissed as Education Secretary when Johnson reshuffled his cabinet.

==== Exams controversy ====
In August 2020, he apologised to schoolchildren for the disruption in the COVID-19 pandemic. He said "...where we haven't got everything great, of course, I'm incredibly sorry for that". There was considerable concern over the A-Level results which, due to all exams having been cancelled in 2020, were based on Ofqual-moderated teacher assessments rather than on moderated exam results. About 39% of results were below the teacher assessment (compared to 79% in 2019) – Ofqual accused some teachers of submitting "implausibly high" predictions. Ofqual rescinded the advice it had given on how the appeals system would operate. The Daily Telegraph reported that Williamson had repeatedly defended the algorithm method as the fairest way to produce grades avoiding grade inflation, though several Ofqual board members had come to believe the algorithm method had been shown to be politically unacceptable.

On 17 August 2020, Ofqual and Williamson announced that the algorithm method for calculating A Level results would be abandoned, and teacher assessments would be used instead, after pressure from within the Conservative Party and the claim that they had lost the confidence of the teaching profession. There were calls for Williamson to resign, for what The Daily Telegraph called "the fiasco". University admission caps were relaxed, as places had already been allocated based on the algorithm results and the change meant many more students would now meet their first-choice university admission offer grades. Teacher assessment would also be used instead of the Ofqual algorithm for GCSE results due to be announced three days later.

In January 2021, GCSE exams were cancelled. The education secretary stated that schools can use optional exams to decide their students' grades. In April 2021, Williamson said that a mobile phone policy ban would be introduced in schools; he also commented that students' behaviour had become worse over the period of lockdown in January. This comment was criticised by some parents, teachers, and headteachers, claiming that "schools already had bans in place" and that Williamson was "not focusing on important matters".

=== Backbenches (2021–2022) ===
Williamson returned to the backbenches after his dismissal as Education Secretary.

Williamson helped Rishi Sunak gain support among Conservative MPs during his failed leadership bid in the July-September 2022 Conservative Party leadership election. Williamson again supported Sunak in the October 2022 Conservative Party leadership election, which he won unopposed.

=== Minister of State without Portfolio (2022) ===
In October 2022, Williamson was appointed Minister of State without Portfolio, a cabinet position, by new Prime Minister Rishi Sunak.

==== Allegations of bullying and resignation ====
It was reported by Tortoise Media on 4 November 2022, followed by other news media, that in October 2022 Wendy Morton had made a formal complaint to the Conservative Party about text messages that Williamson had sent her on 13 September, during her tenure as Chief Whip under Prime Minister Liz Truss; Morton confirmed that she had submitted a complaint. The Sunday Times subsequently published Williamson's WhatsApp messages to Morton in full.

It was also reported that former Conservative chairman Jake Berry had warned Rishi Sunak, the prime minister, that a complaint about Williamson had been made during a private meeting. Sunak later acknowledged he knew of concerns but had not seen the specific texts, which he deemed "unacceptable". In one WhatsApp message, Williamson indicated his frustration that he had not received an invite to the state funeral of Elizabeth II, telling Morton "There is a price for everything", before describing her conduct as "absolutely disgusting". He said she had chosen to "fuck us all over". When challenged he responded that it looked "very shit" and that "perception becomes reality". A source, reported on 4 November 2022, said Williamson had not been told by the party of the formal complaint, but that he "strongly refutes these allegations", and would be "very happy to share all communications with the former chief whip with CCHQ [Conservative Campaign Headquarters] if needed".

On 6 November 2022 cabinet minister Oliver Dowden said that the messages to Morton had been sent "in the heat of the moment" and "should not have been sent". Williamson's messages included angry complaints that MPs who were not "favoured" by Liz Truss were being excluded from Queen Elizabeth's funeral. Labour's Ed Miliband said Williamson's reappointment was not in the public interest. Labour leader Keir Starmer and the Liberal Democrats called for Sunak to sack Williamson over the messages.

On 7 November 2022, The Guardian wrote that a current minister told The Times that Williamson called her to his office at a time she was campaigning about a politically sensitive matter and raised an issue about her private life "which she interpreted as a tacit threat". Unnamed "allies" of Williamson said it was not a threat, but was raised in a "pastoral capacity".

On 7 November 2022 Williamson denied accusations, reported in The Guardian, that he had used bullying language when he was Defence Secretary and had, on one occasion, told an unnamed senior civil servant at the Ministry of Defence to "slit your throat", and on another, to "jump out of the window". It was alleged that he had made the remarks with other civil servants present and the civil servant felt there was a sustained campaign of bullying. The unnamed source said that Williamson had "deliberately demeaned and intimidated" them. In a statement, Williamson said: "I strongly reject this allegation and have enjoyed good working relationships with the many brilliant officials I have worked with across government". The Guardian understood that Williamson did not deny using "those specific words". The former civil servant stated they would take matters to the ICGS due to the "extreme impact" the incidents had on their mental health.

By 7 November 2022, friends of Morton had told the BBC that she had not received an apology or any contact from Williamson. Rishi Sunak said the language used was "not acceptable", but said he still had confidence in Williamson. On 8 November Morton referred Williamson to the parliamentary Independent Complaints and Grievance Scheme. Chair of the Labour Party Anneliese Dodds said Morton's decision to report Williamson showed a "lack of faith in the Conservative Party complaints process".

On 8 November 2022 Williamson resigned, stating that he "refutes the characterisation of these claims" and that he was resigning to avoid becoming a distraction for the government and to enable him to "comply fully with the complaints process that is underway and clear my name of any wrongdoing".

On 9 November 2022 two more sources told The Guardian that, when he was Chief Whip, Williamson was heard joking or boasting about how his tactics affected the mental health of people he worked with. Anne Milton told Channel 4 News that Williamson had used MPs' mental and physical health problems against them, and had collected "salacious gossip" about their "sexual preferences". Milton said that Williamson sent her an email, responding to a female civil servant asking about a minister having to alter travel plans to attend a vote, "Always tell them to fuck off and if they have the bollocks to come and see me. Fuck jumped up civil servants." Milton added "It's an image he cultivates. I think he feels that he's Francis Urquhart from House of Cards." Milton accused Williamson of creating a culture of fear for Conservative MPs by using gossip over their drinking, sex lives or mental health as "leverage" to keep control. Milton thought Sunak's decision to reappoint Williamson was "probably a bit naïve. I don't know that there are many people that would hang out the bunting to see Gavin Williamson back in government."

At Prime Minister's Questions on 9 November 2022 Rishi Sunak said it was "absolutely right" that Williamson had resigned and said: "I obviously regret appointing someone who has had to resign in these circumstances". An unnamed senior Conservative MP told Sky News it had always been well known that Williamson was a bully.

On 10 November 2022, BBC News reported that several other Conservative MPs would have been ready to make formal complaints to Conservative head office over Williamson if he had not resigned. According to the BBC, two formal complaints were submitted to the Independent Complaints and Grievance Scheme (ICGS). Jake Berry stated that he told Sunak about Morton's complaint on 24 October, one day before Williamson was appointed.

On 4 September 2023 Williamson was told by a Parliamentary independent expert panel to apologise to the House of Commons and to take behavioural training. The panel concluded that he had abused his power when he sent Morton text messages in 2022.

=== Backbencher in opposition ===
At the 2024 general election, Williamson's previous seat of South Staffordshire was split, with Williamson being selected as the Conservative candidate for the newly formed constituency of Stone, Great Wyrley and Penkridge. Philip Catney, a senior politics lecturer at Keele University then described the newly-formed constituency as a safe seat, with a Conservative MP being "guaranteed a job for life". Williamson won the election with a majority of 5,466 votes.

Following the 2024 general election, Williamson as a backbencher spearheaded several amendments to the House of Lords (Hereditary Peers) Bill which would additionally abolish the Lords Spiritual from the House of Lords.

== Personal life ==
Williamson married Joanne Eland, a former primary school teacher, in 2001. The couple have two daughters. He was a trustee of a local Citizen's Advice Bureau, and a school governor. He is an Anglican Christian but is opposed to the Lords Spiritual sitting in the House of Lords.

Williamson is a patron of the World Owl Trust and while Government Chief Whip kept a Mexican redknee tarantula, which he named Cronus, in his parliamentary office, for which he was criticised by parliamentary authorities in November 2016. In May 2026, Williamson announced that Cronus had died.

In January 2018, it was reported that while managing director of fireplace firm Elgin & Hall in 2004, Williamson had an affair with a married colleague. He discussed the affair in an interview with the Daily Mail which he called a "dreadful mistake". The Sunday Telegraph reported that Williamson was subsequently the subject of a meeting with managers; he left the firm days later.

In October 2023, a man was convicted of stalking Williamson; Simon Parry, of no fixed address, had "persistently followed" the MP on two occasions earlier that year.

Williamson holds Somaliland honorary citizenship due to his efforts in campaigning for the recognition of Somaliland.

== Honours ==
In May 2015, Williamson was sworn of Her Majesty's Most Honourable Privy Council, permitting use of the honorific style "The Right Honourable". In the 2016 Resignation Honours List of David Cameron, Williamson was put forward for a Commander of the Order of the British Empire (CBE) "for political and public service".

On 3 March 2022, Williamson was gazetted Knight Bachelor as part of the 2022 Special Honours for Political Service. The honour drew disapproval, with Labour's shadow education secretary Bridget Phillipson describing Williamson's record as "disgraceful" and the Liberal Democrats calling the knighthood "an insult to every child, parent and teacher who struggled through COVID against the odds". Investiture of his knighthood was delayed pending an inquiry by Sue Gray into alleged COVID-19 lockdown breaches in Downing Street.

Parliament of the United Kingdom
| Preceded by Patrick Cormack | Member of Parliament for South Staffordshire; 2010–2024 | Constituency abolished |
| New constituency | Member of Parliament for Stone, Great Wyrley and Penkridge; 2024–present | Incumbent |
Political offices
| Preceded by Mark Harper | Government Chief Whip in the House of Commons; 2016–2017 | Succeeded by Julian Smith |
| Preceded by Mark Harper | Parliamentary Secretary to the Treasury; 2016–2017 | Succeeded by Julian Smith |
| Preceded by Michael Fallon | Secretary of State for Defence; 2017–2019 | Succeeded by Penny Mordaunt |
| Preceded by Damian Hinds | Secretary of State for Education; 2019–2021 | Succeeded by Nadhim Zahawi |
| Vacant Title last held by Nigel Adams | Minister of State without Portfolio; 2022 | Vacant Title next held by Esther McVey |
Party political offices
| Preceded by Mark Harper | Conservative Chief Whip in the House of Commons; 2016–2017 | Succeeded by Julian Smith |
