= Medical school =

Tertiary educational institution teaching and granting degrees in medicine

A medical school, medical college, or medical university is a tertiary educational institution, professional school, or forms a part of such an institution, that teaches medicine, and awards a professional degree for physicians. Such medical degrees include the Bachelor of Medicine, Bachelor of Surgery (MBBS, MBChB, MBBCh, BMBS), Master of Medicine (MM, MMed), Doctor of Medicine (MD), or Doctor of Osteopathic Medicine (DO). Many medical schools offer additional degrees, such as a Doctor of Philosophy (PhD), master's degree (MSc) or other post-secondary education.

Medical schools can also carry out medical research and operate teaching hospitals. Around the world, criteria, structure, teaching methodology, and nature of medical programs offered at medical schools vary considerably. Medical schools are often highly competitive, using standardized entrance examinations, as well as grade point averages and leadership roles, to narrow the selection criteria for candidates. In most countries, the study of medicine is completed as an undergraduate degree not requiring prerequisite undergraduate coursework. However, an increasing number of places are emerging for graduate entrants who have completed an undergraduate degree including some required courses. In the United States and Canada, almost all medical degrees are second-entry degrees, and require several years of previous study at the university level.

Medical degrees are awarded to medical students after the completion of their degree program, which typically lasts five or more years for the undergraduate model and four years for the graduate model. Many modern medical schools integrate clinical education with basic sciences from the beginning of the curriculum (e.g.). More traditional curricula are usually divided into preclinical and clinical blocks. In preclinical sciences, students study subjects such as biochemistry, genetics, pharmacology, pathology, anatomy, physiology and medical microbiology, among others. Subsequent clinical rotations usually include internal medicine, general surgery, pediatrics, psychiatry, and obstetrics and gynecology, among others.

Although medical schools confer upon graduates a medical degree, a physician typically may not legally practice medicine until licensed by the local government authority. Licensing may also require passing a test, undergoing a criminal background check, checking references, paying a fee, and undergoing several years of postgraduate training. Medical schools are regulated by each country and appear in the World Directory of Medical Schools which was formed by the merger of the AVICENNA Directory for Medicine and the FAIMER International Medical Education Directory.

== Africa ==
By 2005 there were more than 100 medical schools across Africa, most of which had been established after 1970.

=== Ghana ===
There are seven medical schools in Ghana: The University of Ghana Medical School in Accra, the KNUST School of Medical Sciences in Kumasi, University for Development Studies School of Medicine in Tamale, University of Cape Coast Medical School and the University of Allied Health Sciences in Ho, Volta Region, the private Accra College of Medicine, and Family Health University College(Accra), another private medical school.

Basic Medical education lasts 6 years in all medical schools. Entry into these medical schools is highly competitive and it is usually based on successful completion of the Senior High School Examinations. The University of Ghana Medical School and the University of Cape Coast have, however, introduced a graduate entry medical program to admit students with mainly science-related degrees into a 4-year medical school program (four and half years for the University of Cape Coast).

Students graduating from any of these medical schools get the MBChB degree and the title "Dr". For the first 3 years, students are awarded BSc in the field of Medical Sciences from the University of Ghana medical school; and Human biology for KNUST and UDS medical schools. The University of Ghana Medical School and KNUST School of Medical Sciences in Kumasi use a traditional medical education model whiles the University for Development Studies School of Medicine and School of Medical science of the University of Cape Coast use the problem-based learning model.

Medical graduates are then registered provisionally with the Medical and Dental Council (MDC) of Ghana as House Officers (Interns). Upon completion of the mandatory 2-year housemanship, these medical doctors are permanently registered with the MDC and can practice as medical officers (General Practitioners) anywhere in the country. The housemanship training is done only in hospitals accredited for such purposes by the Medical and Dental Council of Ghana.

Following the permanent registration with the Medical and Dental Council, doctors can specialize in any of the various fields that is organized by either the West African College of Physicians and Surgeons or the Ghana College of Physician and Surgeons.

Medical officers are also sometimes hired by the Ghana Health Service to work in the District/Rural areas as Primary Care Physicians.

=== Kenya ===
In Kenya, medical schools are faculties of a university. Medical education lasts for 6 years after which the student graduates with an undergraduate (MBChB) degree. This is followed by a mandatory 12-month full-time internship at an approved hospital after which one applies for registration with the Kenya Medical Practitioners and Dentists Board if they intend to practice medicine in the country. The first two years of medical school cover the basic medical (preclinical) sciences while the last four years are focused on the clinical sciences and internship.

Completion of formal specialty training in Kenya is followed by two years of supervised clinical work before one can apply for recognition as a specialist, in their respective field, by the medical board.

There are no medical school entry examinations or interviews and admission is based on the student's performance in the high school exit examination (Kenya Certificate of Secondary Education - KCSE). Students who took the AS Level or the SAT can also apply but there is a very strict quota limiting the number of students that get accepted into public universities. This quota does not apply to private universities.

=== Nigeria ===
There are several medical schools in Nigeria. Entrance into these schools is highly competitive. Candidates graduating from high school must attain high scores on the West African Examination Council's (WAEC) Senior School Certificate Exam (SSCE/GCE) and high scores in five subjects (Physics, Mathematics, English, Chemistry, and Biology) in the University Matriculation Examination (UME). Students undergo rigorous training for 6 years and culminate with a Bachelor of Medicine and Bachelor of Surgery (MBBS/MBChB). The undergraduate program is six years and one year of work experience in government hospitals. After medical school, graduates are mandated to spend one year of housemanship (internship) and one year of community service before they are eligible to be fully licensed by the Medical and Dental Council. Candidates are required to score at least 280 in the UME. Though this score may vary due to different performances per year and it also depends on the college standards.

=== South Africa ===
There are eleven medical schools in South Africa, each under the auspices of a public university. As the country is a former British colony, most institutions follow the British-based undergraduate method of instruction, admitting students directly from high school into 6 or 5-year programs. Some universities such as the University of the Witwatersrand in Johannesburg have started offering post-graduate medical degrees that run concurrently with their undergraduate programs. In this instance, a student having completed an appropriate undergraduate degree with basic sciences can enter into a four-year postgraduate program.

South African medical schools award the MB ChB degree, except the University of the Witwatersrand, which styles its degree MB BCh. Some universities allow students to earn an intercalated degree, completing a BSc (Medical) with an additional year of study after the second or third year of the MBChB. The University of Cape Town, in particular, has spearheaded a recent effort to increase the level of medical research training and exposure of medical students through an Intercalated Honours Programme, with the option to extend this to a PhD.

Following successful completion of study, all South African medical graduates must complete a two-year internship as well as a further year of community service in order to register with the Health Professions Council and practice as a doctor in the country.

Specialisation is usually a five- to seven-year training process (depending on the specialty) requiring registering as a medical registrar attached to an academic clinical department in a large teaching hospital with appropriate examinations. The specialist qualification may be conferred as a Fellowship by the independent Colleges of Medicine of South Africa (CMSA), following British tradition, or as a Magisterial degree by the university (usually the M Med, Master of Medicine, degree). The Medical schools and the CMSA also offer Higher Diplomas in many fields. Research degrees are the MMed and PhD or MD, depending on the university.

Medical students from all over the world come to South Africa to gain practical experience in the country's many teaching hospitals and rural clinics. The language of instruction is English but a few indigenous languages are studied briefly. The University of the Free State has a parallel medium policy, meaning all English classes are also presented in Afrikaans, therefore students who choose to study in Afrikaans, do so separately from the English class.

=== Sudan ===
In Sudan, a medical school is a faculty of a university. Medical school is usually 5–6 years, and by the end of the 5–6 years, the students acquire a bachelor's degree in Medicine and Surgery. Post graduating there is a mandatory one-year full-time internship at one of the universities or Government Teaching hospitals in the four major Specialty in 3 months rotation, then a license is issued after a written exam conducted by the Sudan medical council (SMC).

During the first 3–4 years the curriculum is completed, and throughout the next 2 years it is repeated with clinical training. Students with high grades in high school are accepted for free in Government Universities. Private faculty accept low grades than governmental faculty but their grades still high. Students who take foreign examinations other than the Sudanese High School Examination are also accepted in Universities, students taking IGCSE/SATs and other Arabian countries. All medical students who want to be enrolled in an internship program should undergo registration under the Sudanese Medical Council. Postgraduate training is conducted by Sudan medical specialisation board (SMSB) and the degree obtained is medical doctor (MD). The duration of training varies from 4–6 years depend on the scientific Council of the specific speciality.

=== Tanzania ===
In Tanzania, medical school is a school within a university or can be an independent university dealing with health related courses only affiliated with a large sized hospital. Medical education lasts for 5 years after which the student graduates with an undergraduate (MD) degree. This is followed by a mandatory 12-month full-time internship at an approved hospital after which one applies for registration with the Medical Council of Tanzania (MCT) if they intend to practice medicine in the country. The first two years of medical school cover the Bio medical sciences or simply basic (pre-clinical) sciences while the last three years are focused on the clinical sciences.

There are no medical school entry examinations or interviews and admission is based on students' performance in the high school exit examination (Advanced Certificate of Secondary Education Examination - ACSEE). Alternatively are student who took diploma in clinical medicine with an average of G.P.A 3.5 distinction who have very few seats.

=== Uganda ===
As of April 2017, there are nine accredited medical schools in Uganda. Training leading to the award of the degree of Bachelor of Medicine and Bachelor of Surgery (MBChB) lasts five years, if there are no re-takes. After graduating, a year of internship in a hospital designated for that purpose, under the supervision of a specialist in that discipline is required before an unrestricted license to practice medicine and surgery is granted by the Uganda Medical and Dental Practitioners Council (UMDPC).

There is Postgraduate training such as the degree of Master of Medicine (MMed) which is a three-year programme, available at Makerere University School of Medicine in several disciplines. Makerere University School of Public Health, offers the degree of Master of Public Health (MPH) following a 22-month period of study, which includes field work.

=== Zimbabwe ===
In Zimbabwe, there are three medical schools is offering Medical degrees. For undergrads, these are University of Zimbabwe - College of Health Sciences {MBChB}, National University of Science and Technology (NUST) Medical school {MBBS} and Midlands State University (MSU) {MBChB}. Only UZ is offering postgrad degrees in the Medical faculty.

Training lasts 5 1/2 years. The curriculum is as follows:

- Part 1 (1 year) – Biochemistry, Communication Skills for Academic Purposes, Anatomy, Physiology and Behavioral Sciences. Professional exams are written in the first two and failure to attain a pass in Biochemistry warranties a repeat of first year.
- Part 2 (1 year) – Communication Skills for Professional Purposes, Anatomy, Physiology, Behavioral Sciences. Professional exams are written at the end of second year and failure to attain a passmark in any of the last three courses on the list warranties a repeat of the year. Communication Skills can be carried to the next year, but the student should pass the course before graduation.
- Part 3 (1.5 years) – Pathology (Histopathology), Medical Microbiology, Chemical Pathology, Hematology, Forensic Pathology, Immunology and Toxicology. A professional exam is written at the end of the third year and the student has to pass to proceed. There are also surgery and medicine rotations during the year. Also, the students cover most of the basic Pharmacology during the third stage of the degrees.
- Part 4 (1 year) – Community Medicine, Psychiatry and Clinical Pharmacology
- Part 5 (1 year) – Medicine, Surgery, Obstetrics and Gynecology, Pediatrics

Internships are two years in duration, with the first year spent in medicine and surgery and the second year doing pediatrics, anesthesia/psychiatry and obstetrics and gynecology. Thereafter one can apply for MMED at the university which last 4–5 years depending on specialty. Currently no subspecialist education is available.

=== Zambia ===
Zambia has several institutions offering medical education at undergraduate and postgraduate levels. The country's medical schools operate under the oversight of the Health Professions Council of Zambia (HPCZ), which regulates training, accreditation, and licensing of medical practitioners.

Medical education in Zambia typically follows a six-year MBChB program, which includes pre-clinical and clinical phases, followed by a mandatory one-year internship at a recognized hospital. Graduates must register with the HPCZ to practice as medical doctors.

The University of Zambia School of Medicine in Lusaka, established in 1966, was the country's first medical school. Since then, several other public and private institutions have emerged to meet the growing demand for medical professionals.

Notable medical universities in Zambia include:

- University of Zambia School of Medicine (UNZA–SoM) – Lusaka
- Copperbelt University School of Medicine (CBU–SoM) – Ndola
- Texila American University Zambia (TAU–Z) – Lusaka
- Levy Mwanawasa Medical University (LMMU) – Lusaka
- Lusaka Apex Medical University (LAMU) – Lusaka

Medical students undergo intensive academic and clinical training in affiliated teaching hospitals. Upon graduation and completion of internship, they may pursue postgraduate specialization within Zambia or abroad, through recognized programs such as Master of Medicine (MMed) and Doctor of Medicine (MD).

== Asia and Oceania ==
=== Australia ===
Historically, Australian medical schools have followed the British tradition by conferring the degrees of Bachelor of Medicine and Bachelor of Surgery (MBBS) to its graduates whilst reserving the title of Doctor of Medicine (MD) for their research training degree, analogous to the PhD, or for their honorary doctorates. Although the majority of Australian MBBS degrees have been graduate programs since the 1990s, under the previous Australian Qualifications Framework (AQF) they remained categorised as Level 7 Bachelor degrees together with other undergraduate programs.

The latest version of the AQF includes the new category of Level 9 Master's (Extended) degrees which permits the use of the term 'Doctor' in the styling of the degree title of relevant professional programs. As a result, various Australian medical schools have replaced their MBBS degrees with the MD to resolve the previous anomalous nomenclature. With the introduction of the Master's level MD, universities have also renamed their previous medical research doctorates. The University of Melbourne was the first to introduce the MD in 2011 as a basic medical degree, and has renamed its research degree to Doctor of Medical Science (DMedSc).

=== Bangladesh ===
In Bangladesh, admission to medical colleges is organized by the Governing Body of University of Dhaka. A single admission test is held for government and private colleges. Due to the highly competitive nature of these exams, the total number of applicants across the country is around 78 times the number of students accepted. Admission is based on the entrance examination, as well as students' individual academic records.

The entrance examination has a time limit of one hour. 100 marks are allocated based on objective questions, in which the mark allocation is distributed between a variety of subjects. Biology questions carry 30 marks, Chemistry carries 25, Physics carries 20, English carries 15, and general knowledge carries 10.

Additionally, students' previous SSC (Secondary School Certificate) scores carry up to 75 and HSC (Higher Secondary School Certificate) scores carry up to 125 marks towards the overall examination result.

English students prepare themselves for the admission exam ahead of time. This is because as the GCSE and A-Level exams do not cover parts of the Bangladesh syllabus.

The undergraduate program consists of five years study, followed by a one-year internship. The degrees granted are Bachelor of Medicine and Bachelor of Surgery (MBBS). Further postgraduate qualifications may be obtained in the form of Diplomas or Degrees (MS or MD), MPhil and FCPS (Fellowship of the College of Physicians and Surgeons).

The University of Dhaka launched a new BSc in "Radiology and Imaging Technology," offering 30 students the opportunity to contribute towards their entrance exam grade. For students who have passed the HSC, this course contributes towards 25% of the mark. The course contributes up to 75% for Diploma-holding students. The duration of the course is four years (plus 12 weeks for project submission). The course covers a variety of topics, including behavioural science, radiological ethics, imaging physics and general procedure.

=== Cambodia ===
After six years of general medical education (a foundation year + 5 years), all students will graduate with a Bachelor of Medical Sciences (BMedSc) (បរិញ្ញាប័ត្រ វិទ្យាសាស្រ្តវេជ្ជសាស្ត្រ). This degree does not allow graduates to work independently as Physician, but it is possible for those who wish to continue to master's degrees in other fields relating to medical sciences such as Public Health, Epidemiology, Biomedical Science, Nutrition.

Medical graduates, who wish to be fully qualified as physicians or specialists must meet these conditions:

- General Practitioner's (GP) course is 8 years (BMedSc + 2-year internship). Clinical rotation in the internship is modulated within 4 main disciplines (general medicine, surgery, gynecology, pediatrics). The medical degree awarded is the Doctor of Medicine (MD) (សញ្ញាប័ត្រ វេជ្ជបណ្ឌិត), equivalent to a master's degree.
- After graduating with BMedSc; any students, who wishes to enter Residency Training Programs, are required to sit for a rigorous and Entrance Exam. The duration of residency programs lasts from 3 to 4 years after BMedSc (BMedSc + 3–4 years of specialization). Once the graduates, after successful defense of their practicum thesis, are officially awarded the Degree of Specialized Doctor (MD-with specialization) (សញ្ញាប័ត្រវេជ្ជបណ្ឌិតឯកទេស) "Professional Doctorate".

All Medical graduates must complete a thesis defense and pass the national exit exam (ប្រឡងចេញថ្នាក់ជាតិក្នុងវិស័យសុខាភិបាល) to become a GP or a medical or surgical specialist.

=== China ===
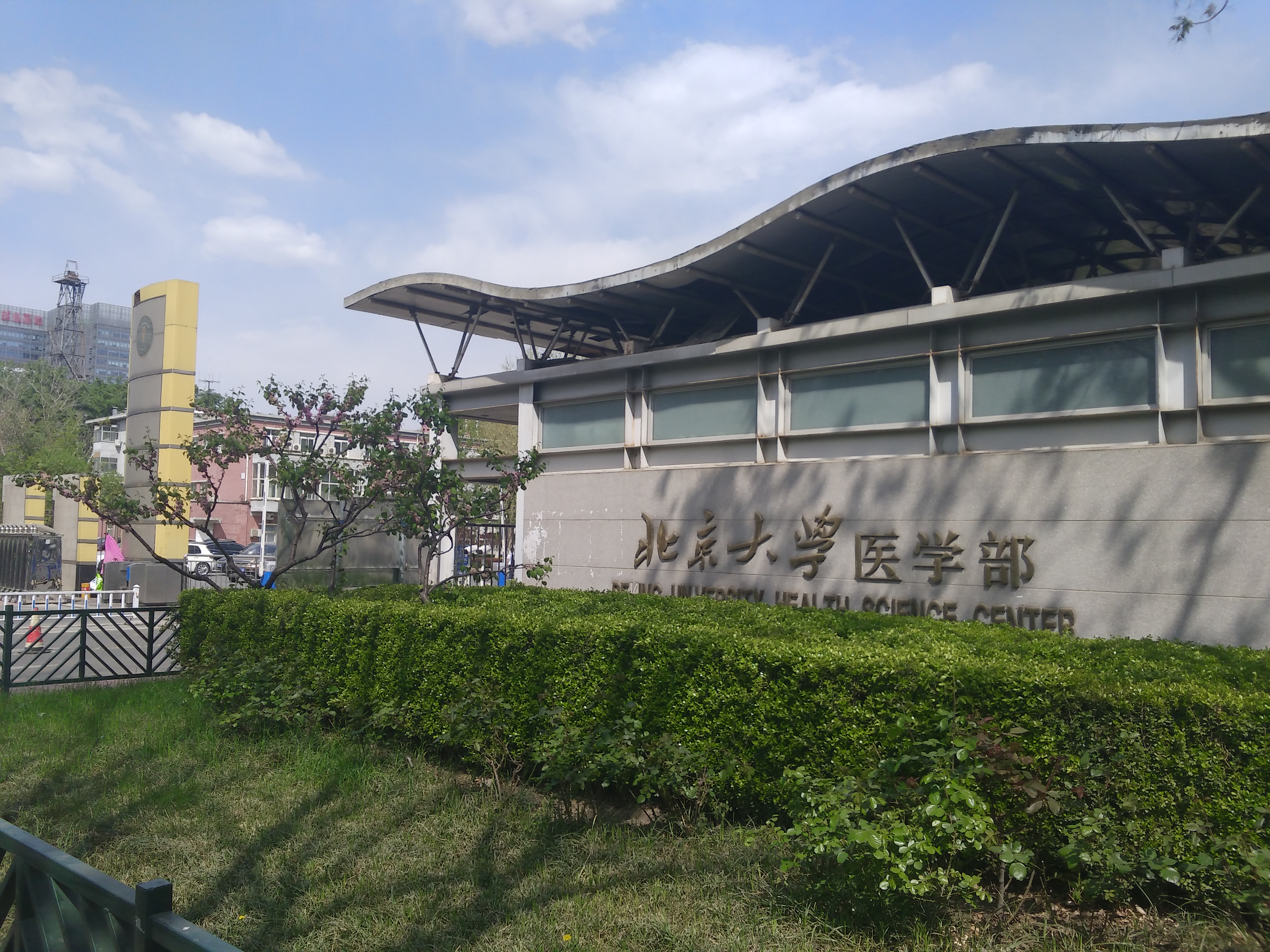
Peking University Health Science Center

Medical education is normally a five-year Bachelor degree, including a one-year internship (or clinical rotation, during which students are actively involved in patient care) before the final degree is awarded. Although some medical schools run three-year programs, hospitals tend to recruit physicians who have graduated from five-year programs. Students who graduate from medical school must work 1–3 years in a university-affiliated hospital, after which the student is eligible to take the National Medical Licensing Examination (NMLE) for physician certification, which is conducted by the National Medical Examination Center (NMEC). Candidates who pass are certified as physicians by the Ministry of Health. Clinical specialization usually involves a two-or three-year Master degree. Acceptance is based on the national entrance examination used for all universities. In all over China, the Bachelor of Medicine and Bachelor of Surgery (MBBS) Degree courses have been always taught in Chinese medium. There are a few colleges that teach in English and accept foreign medical students. Some of those universities have increased their course duration to 6 years. The degree conferred is known as Bachelor of Clinical Medicine (BCM).

=== Fiji ===
Medical education is normally a six-year Bachelor of Medicine and Bachelor of Surgery degree, including a one-year of trainee internship (or clinical rotation, during which students are actively involved in patient care) before the final degree is awarded. Students who graduate from medical school must complete an year of graduate training in a government hospital, after which they are eligible to practice medicine.

There are two accredited medical schools in Fiji:

- Fiji National University, College of Medicine, Nursing and Health Sciences (Formerly, Fiji School of Medicine).
- University of Fiji, Umanand Prasad School Medicine and Health Sciences.

Clinical specialization usually involves a three-year master's degree. Acceptance into Medical School is based on the Fiji Year 13 Certificate Examination used for all universities. In all over Fiji, the Bachelor of Medicine and Bachelor of Surgery (MBBS) Degree courses have been always taught in English medium.

=== Hong Kong ===
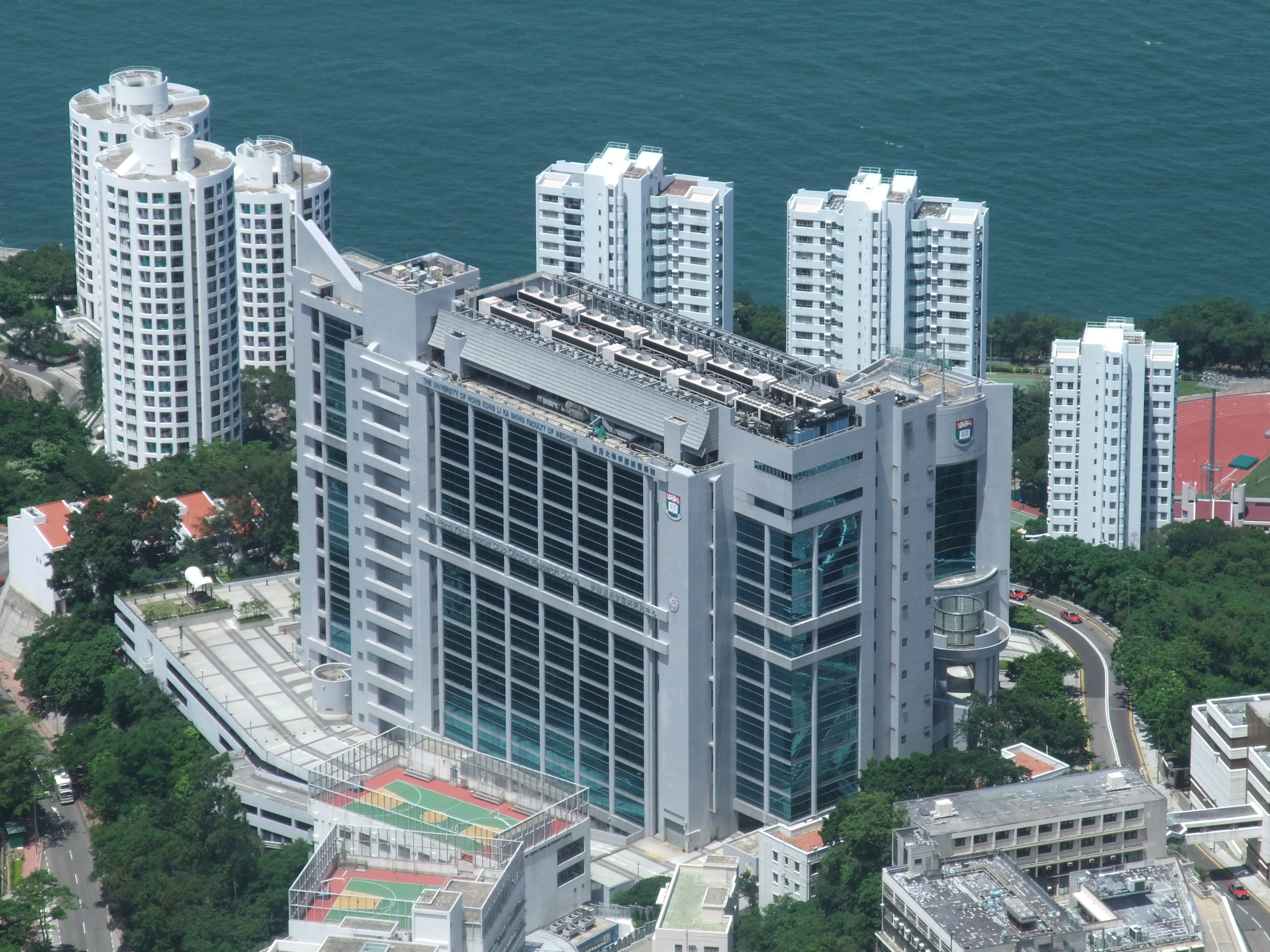
Li Ka Shing Faculty of Medicine at the University of Hong Kong, among the oldest western medicine schools in the Far East

In Hong Kong, medical programmes are bachelor's degrees with a usual duration of six years, leading to the degrees of Bachelor of Medicine and Bachelor of Surgery. Students are eligible upon graduating secondary school, and sitting the local Hong Kong Diploma of Secondary Education Examination (HKDSE) (JUPAS candidates) or other international examinations such as the International Baccalaureate and GCE A-Level (non-JUPAS candidates).

There are two medical schools in Hong Kong:

- Li Ka Shing Faculty of Medicine, University of Hong Kong (HKU)
- Faculty of Medicine, The Chinese University of Hong Kong (CUHK)

Both medical faculties are also the sole two institutes offering pharmacy programmes. Meanwhile, other healthcare programmes (like nursing) can also be found in universities which do not host a medical faculty.

The CUHK Faculty of Medicine offers the Dynamic Year 2 (DY2) option, which allows high-achieving students who have acquired a certain minimum level in relevant academic qualifications to be admitted directly to Year 2.

Prior to the introduction of the HKDSE in 2012, both medical programmes had a duration of five years for students taking the Hong Kong Advanced Level Examination (HKALE).

Admission to a medical program is highly competitive as the number of intakes each year is limited. As of 2024, the first year intake of each program is 295 (590 in total). Hence, candidates need to attain an excellent examination result and good performance in interviews. The schools put a great emphasis on students' languages (both Chinese and English) and communication skills as they need to communicate with other healthcare professionals and patients or their families in the future.

During their studies at the medical schools, students need to accumulate enough clinical practicing hours in addition before their graduation.

To obtain full registration as registered medical practitioners, medical graduates must undertake and complete at least one year of supervised practice in approved hospitals, generally known as an internship, with satisfactory performance. During this year, interns (house officers) are rotated to four specialties (medicine, surgery, and two of the following: obstetrics and gynaecology, paediatrics, orthopaedics and traumatology, emergency medicine, psychiatry, and ophthalmology). Each of them lasts three months. There is no work hour limit in Hong Kong and interns are expected to work 80–100 hours per week.

=== India ===
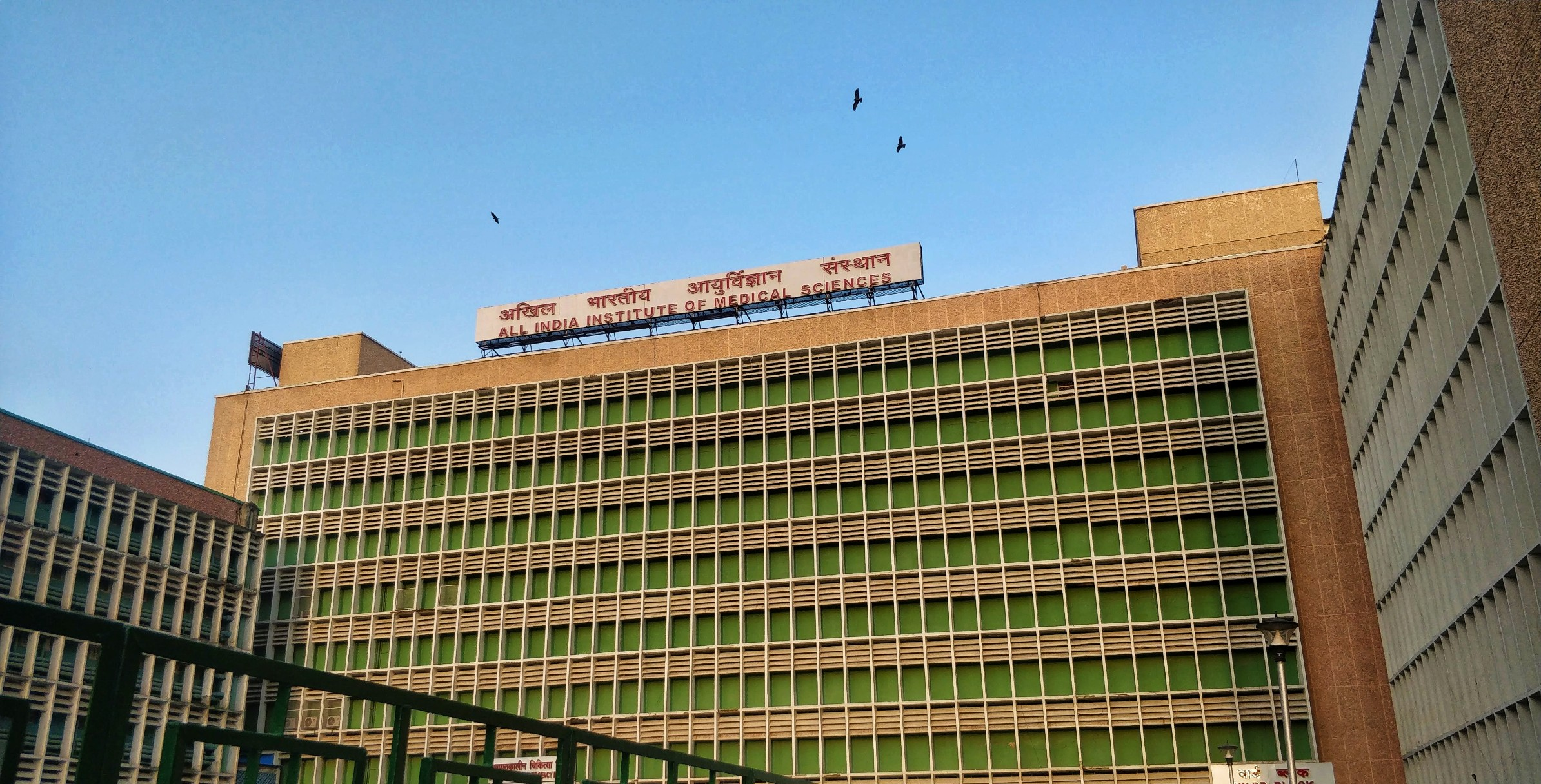
All India Institute of Medical Sciences, New Delhi, India.

In India, admission to medical colleges is organized by the central government by NTA (National Testing Agency) through tests known as NEET entrance examination. Students who have successfully completed their 10+2 (Physics, Chemistry and Biology Marks are considered and PCB is mandatory) education (higher secondary school) can appear for the tests the same year.

The NEET-UG (National Eligibility cum Entrance Test) for filling up of 15% of total MBBS seats in India, conducted by NTA (National Testing Agency) 1 time in a year in the month of May intakes about only 65,000 students out of a total applicants of over 15,00,000. The Supreme Court Of India has mandated the necessity of entrance examination based upon multiple choice questions and negative marking for wrong answers with subsequent merit over 50% for selection into MBBS as well as higher medical education. The entrance exams are highly competitive.

The graduate program consists of three professionals consisting of 9 semesters, followed by one-year internship (rotating housemanship). The degree granted is Bachelor of Medicine and Bachelor of Surgery (MBBS) of five years and six months.

The graduate degree of MBBS is divided into three professionals, with each professional ending with a professional exam conducted by the university (a single university may have up to dozens of medical colleges offering various graduate/post-graduate/post-doctoral degrees). After clearing this the student moves into the next professional. Each professional exam consists of a theory exam and a practical exam conducted not only by the same college but also external examiners. The exams are tough and many students are unable to clear them, thereby prolonging their degree time. The first professional is for 1 year and includes preclinical subjects, anatomy, physiology and biochemistry. The second professional is for 1 1/2 years and has subjects pathology, pharmacology, microbiology (including immunology) and forensic medicine. Clinical exposure starts in the second professional. The third professional is divided into two parts. Part 1 consists of ophthalmology, ENT, and PSM (preventive and social medicine) and part 2 consists of general-medicine (including dermatology, psychiatry as short subjects), general surgery (including radiology, anaesthesiology and orthopaedics as short subjects) and pediatrics and gynaecology and obstetrics. This is followed by one-year of internship (house-surgeonship). After internship, the degree of MBBS is awarded by the respective university. Some states have made rural service compulsory for a certain period of time after MBBS.

Selection for higher medical education is through entrance examinations as mandated by the Supreme Court Of India. Further postgraduate qualifications may be obtained as Post-graduate Diploma of two years residency or Doctoral Degree (MS: Master of Surgery, or MD) of three years of residency under the aegis of the Medical Council of India. The MD/MS seats in India are filled up through NEET PG Examination conducted by the National Board of Examinations (NBE) under the supervision of the Directorate General Of Health Services. Theses/Dissertations are mandatory to be submitted and cleared by university along with examinations (written and clinicals) to obtain MD/MS degree. Further sub-speciality post-doctoral qualification (DM - Doctorate of Medicine, or MCh - Magister of Chirurgery) of three years of residency followed by university examinations may also be obtained.

PG (post-graduate) qualification is equivalent to MD/MS, consisting of two/three-years residency after MBBS. A PG diploma may also be obtained through the National Board of Examinations (NBE), which also offers three-years residency for sub-specialisation. All degrees by NBE are called DNB (Diplomate of National Board). DNB's are awarded only after clearance of theses/dissertations and examinations. DNBs equivalent to DM/MCh have to clear examinations mandatorily.

=== Indonesia ===
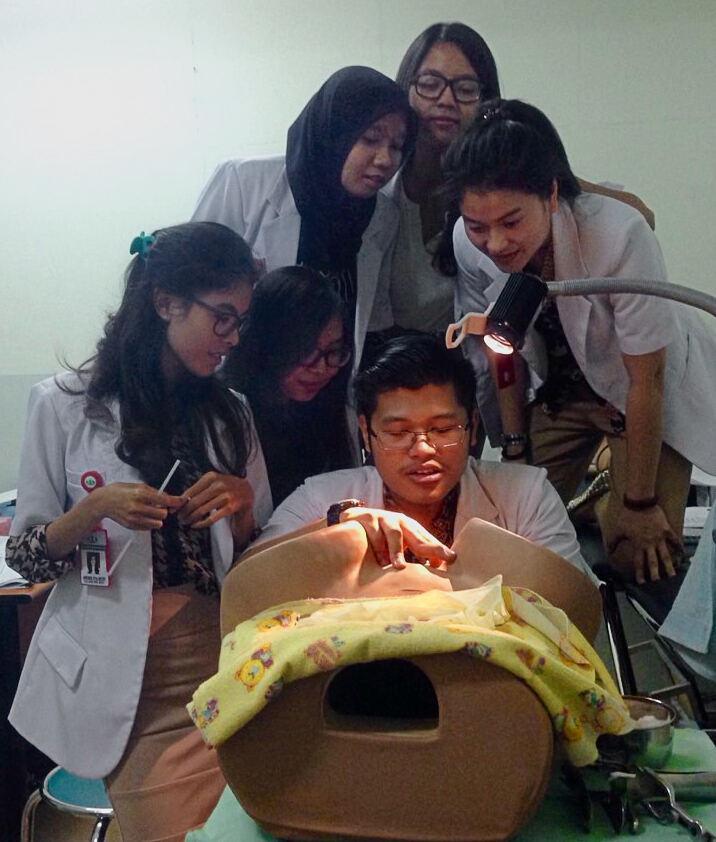
A group of Indonesian medical students at Trisakti University trains with an obstetric mannequin

In Indonesia, high school graduates who aspires to enroll in public medical schools must apply to medicine undergraduate program available in certain public universities. Most common ways to apply to public universities are SNBP (Achievement-based National Selection, Indonesian: Seleksi Nasional Berdasarkan Prestasi, organized without test, using high school evaluation reports) and SNBT (Test-Based National Selection, Indonesian: Seleksi Nasional Berdasarkan Tes, organized with test), both administered by Institution of Higher Education Admissions Test under The Indonesian Ministry of Education, Culture, Research, and Technology. Another way with fewer places are available through entrance exam conducted autonomously by each university (known as independent admission). These admissions are highly competitive for medicine, especially in prestigious institutions such as University of Indonesia in Jakarta, Airlangga University in Surabaya, and Gadjah Mada University in Yogyakarta. For private medical schools, almost all places offer seats through independently run admission tests.

The standard Indonesian medical school curriculum is six years long. The four years long undergraduate program is composed mainly of classroom education, continued with the last two years in professional program which primarily includes rotations in clinical settings where students learn patient care firsthand. If they pass the undergraduate program, they will be granted the title "S.Ked" (Bachelor of Medicine) and if they finish the professional program and pass the national examination arranged by IDI (Indonesian Medical Association) they will become general physician and be assigned the prefix, "dr. (doctor)".

Upon graduation, a physician planning to become a specialist in a specific field of medicine must complete a residency, which is a supervised training with periods ranging from three to four years. A physician who sub-specializes or who desires more supervised experience may complete a fellowship, which is an additional one to three years of supervised training in his/her area of expertise.

=== Japan ===
In Japan, medical schools are faculties of universities and thus they are undergraduate programs that generally last for six years. Admission is based on an exam taken at the end of high school and an entrance exam at the university itself, which is the most competitive.

Medical students study Liberal Arts and Sciences for the first 1–2 years, which include Physics, Mathematics, Chemistry, and Foreign Languages, followed by 2 years of Basic Medicine (Anatomy, Physiology, Pharmacology, Immunology), Clinical Medicine, Public health, and Forensics.

Medical students train at the University Hospital for the last two years. Clinical training is a part of the curriculum. Upon completion of the graduation examination, students are awarded an MD Medical graduates are titled as Doctor, as are PhD holders. The university does have an MD/PhD program that enables Doctors of Medicine to become PhD holders, as well.

At the end, Medical students take the National Medical License examination and, if they pass it, become a Physician and register in the record in the Ministry of Health, Labour and Welfare. The scope of this exam encompasses every aspect of medicine.

=== Kyrgyzstan ===
In Kyrgyzstan, the government university Kyrgyz State Medical Academy offers 6 years duration undergraduate (bachelor's degree) program whereas the other institutions mostly private such as the International School of Medicine at the International University of Kyrgyzstan offers a five-year medical program, with a requisite for English knowledge, that is recognized by the World Health Organization, the General Medical Council, and UNESCO. The medical school is also partnered with the University of South Florida School of Medicine, the University of Heidelberg (Germany), the Novosibirsk Medical University (Russia), and the University of Sharjah (UAE).

Other medical schools located in Kyrgyzstan include the 5 years duration MD/MBBS undergraduate degree program at International University of Science and Business or Mezhdunarodnyy Universitet Nauki i Biznesa, Kyrgyzstan others are the Asian Medical Institute, Kyrgyzstan and the Medical Institute, Osh State University.

=== Macau ===
Macau University of Science and Technology offers the only Bachelor of Medicine and Bachelor of Surgery undergraduate clinical medicine program in Macau.

=== Malaysia ===
In Malaysia, getting into medical school is regarded as difficult, due to high fees and a rigorous selection process. Some new medical schools do offer a foundation in medicine course before admission into a full-time medical programme. Most government, and some private medical schools offer MD, and others mostly offer MBBS degrees.

=== Myanmar ===
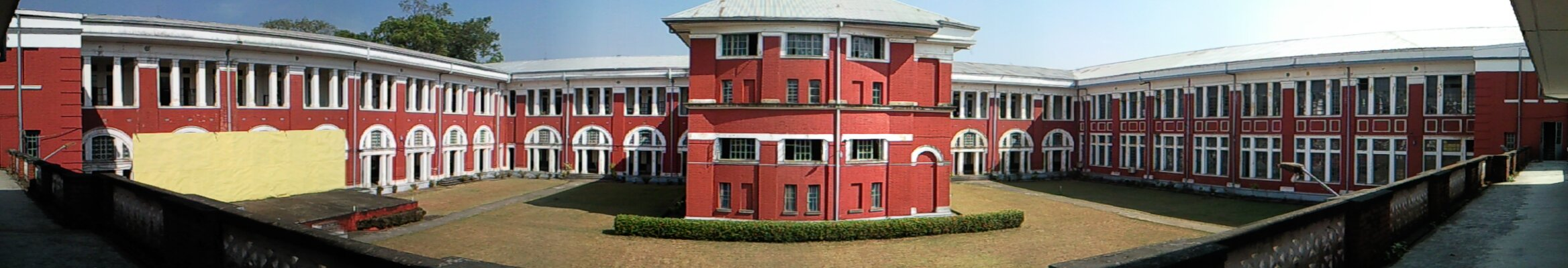
A panoramic view of Lanmadaw Campus

As of 2015, there are six medical institutions in Myanmar - UM 1, UM 2, DSMA, UM Mdy, UM Mgy and the newly established UMTG. Myanmar medical schools are government-funded and require Myanmar citizenship for eligibility. No private medical school exist at this moment. In Myanmar, admission to medical colleges is organized under the Department of Health Science, which is the branch of Ministry of Health and Sport of Myanmar.

A student can join one of the six medical universities of Myanmar if he gets the highest scores in the science combination of the matriculation examination. This exam is highly competitive. Entrance is solely based on this examination and academic records have very minor consequences on an application. The undergraduate program is five years plus one year for work experience in government hospitals. After medical school, Myanmar medical graduates are under contract to spend one year of internship and three years of tenure in rural areas before they are eligible for most residency positions. The degree granted is Bachelor of Medicine and Bachelor of Surgery (MBBS). Further postgraduate qualifications may be obtained as a degree (MMedSc) and (DrMedSc).

=== Nepal ===
As of 2020, Nepal had 23 medical schools (6 public and 17 private). Medical studies start at undergraduate level and are taught by mostly Indian and Nepalese faculty. Studies typically take four and a half years followed by a one-year internship. Graduates are conferred the MBBS degree. Scholarships are provided to between 10 and 20% of students. Upon graduation, scholarship students have to serve in health facilities in rural Nepal for two years after graduation. In turn, self financing students tend to come from upper socioeconomic status due to the high cost of medical education in Nepal

There are four main medical bodies in Nepal:

- Tribhuvan University (own college: Institute of Medicine, Maharajgunj, affiliated colleges: National Medical College, Janaki Medical College, Universal College of Medical Sciences, Gandaki Medical College, Chitwan Medical College, Kist Medical College, Nepal Army Institute of Health Science)
- Kathmandu University (own college: Kathmandu University School of Medical Sciences (KUSMS), Affiliated colleges: Manipal College of Medical Sciences, Kathmandu Medical College, Nepal Medical College, Nepalgunj Medical College, College of Medical Sciences, Nobel Medical College, Lumbini Medical College, Birat Medical College, Devdaha Medical College)
- B.P. Koirala Institute of Health Sciences.
- Patan Academy of Health Sciences

The Medical Education Commission was established in 2017 with the goal of improving the quality of medical education in Nepal. Nepal Medical Council (NMC) was established in 2020 with the primary role of registering qualified doctors.

=== New Zealand ===
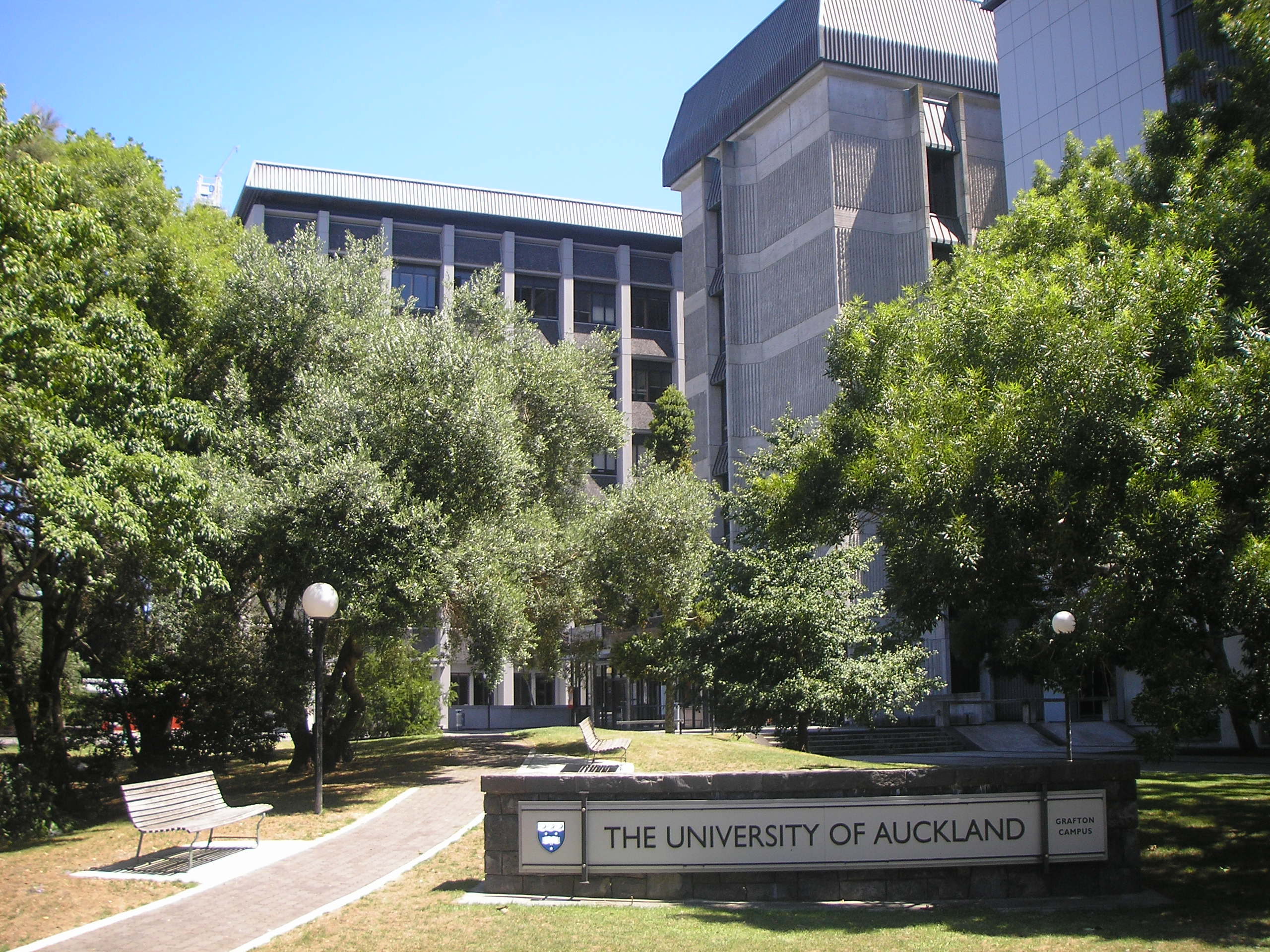
Auckland School of Medicine

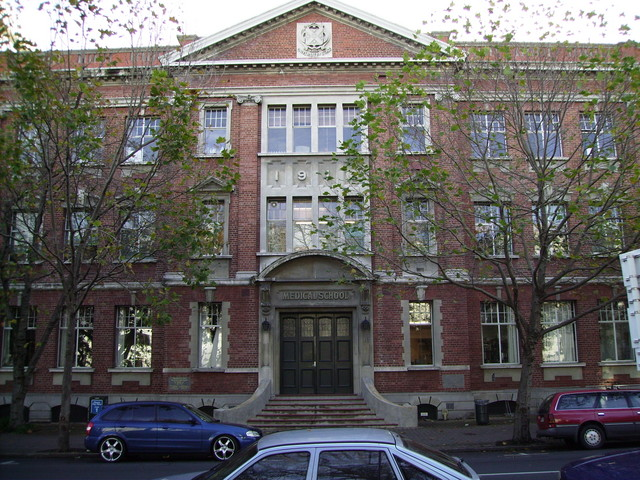
Otago School of Medicine

New Zealand medical programs are undergraduate-entry programs of six years duration. Students are considered for acceptance only after a year of undergraduate basic sciences or, as alternative, following the completion of a bachelor's degree. There are two main medical schools in New Zealand: the University of Auckland and the University of Otago. Each of these has subsidiary medical schools such as Otago's Wellington School of Medicine and Health Sciences and Auckland's Waikato Clinical School.

The first year of the medical degree is the basic sciences year, which comprises study in chemistry, biology, physics, and biochemistry as well as population health and behavioural sciences. The following two years are spent studying human organ systems and pathological processes in more detail as well as professional and communication development. Toward the end of the third year, students begin direct contact with patients in hospital settings.

The clinical years begin fully at the beginning of year 4, where students rotate through various areas of general clinical medicine with rotation times varying from between two and six weeks. Year 5 continues this pattern, focusing more on specialized areas of medicine and surgery. Final medical school exams (exit exams) are actually held at the end of year 5, which is different from most other countries, where final exams are held near the very end of the medical degree. Final exams must be passed before the student is allowed to enter year 6.

The final year (Year 6) of medical school is known as the "Trainee Intern" year, wherein a student is known as a "Trainee Intern" (commonly referred to in the hospitals as a "T.I."). Trainee interns repeat most rotations undertaken in years 4 and 5 but at a higher level of involvement and responsibility for patient care. Trainee interns receive a stipend grant from the New Zealand government (not applicable for international students). At the current time, this is $NZ 26,756/year (about $US 18,500). Trainee interns have responsibility under supervision for the care of about one-third the patient workload of a junior doctor. However, all prescriptions and most other orders (e.g., radiology requests and charting of IV fluids) made by trainee interns must be countersigned by a registered doctor.

New Zealand medical schools currently award the degrees of Bachelor of Medicine and Bachelor of Surgery (MBChB).

Upon completion of the sixth year, students go on to become "House Officers," also known as "House Surgeons" for 1–2 years where they rotate through specialities in the first year and then begin to narrow down to what they'd like to do for speciality training in the second year. After 2 years of house officer work they apply to get into a training scheme and start to train towards the speciality.

=== Pakistan ===
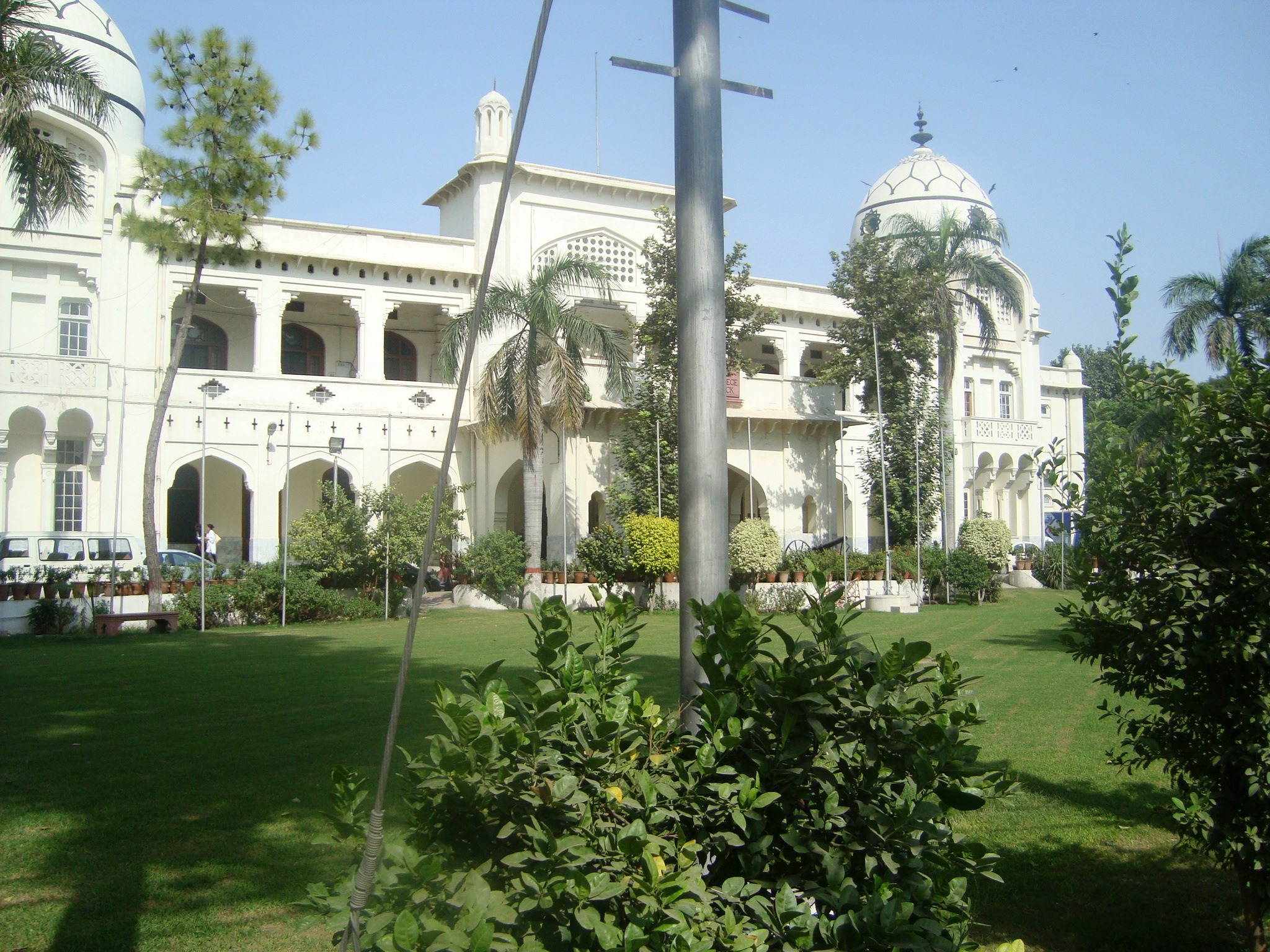
King Edward Medical University, fourth oldest medical school in South Asia

In Pakistan a medical school is more often referred to as a medical college. A medical college is affiliated with a university as a department. There are however several medical universities and medical institutes with their own medical colleges. All medical colleges and universities are regulated by the respective provincial department of health. They however have to be recognized after meeting a set criteria by a central regulatory authority called Pakistan Medical and Dental Council (PMDC) in Islamabad. There are almost equal number of government and private medical colleges and universities, with their number exceeding 50. Admission to a government medical college is highly competitive. Entrance into the medical colleges is based on merit under the guidelines of PMDC. Both the academic performance at the college (high school, grades 11–12) level and an entrance test like MCAT are taken into consideration for the eligibility to enter most of the medical colleges. After successfully completing five years of academic and clinical training in the medical college and affiliated teaching hospitals the graduates are awarded a Bachelor of Medicine and Bachelor of Surgery (MBBS) degree. The graduates are then eligible to apply for a medical license from the PMDC. A house job of one-year duration is mandatory in a teaching hospital after completing five years of academic and clinical training in the medical college.

=== Philippines ===
The Dominicans, under the Spanish Government, established the oldest medical school in the Philippines in 1871, known as the Faculty of Medicine and Surgery (at that time was one with the University of Santo Tomas Faculty of Pharmacy, also considered the oldest pharmacy school in the Philippines) of the Pontifical and Royal University of Santo Tomas in Intramuros, Manila.

Medical education in the Philippines became widespread under the American administration. The Americans, led by the insular government's Secretary of the Interior, Dean Worcester, built the University of the Philippines College of Medicine and Surgery in 1905. By 1909, nursing instruction was also begun at the Philippine Normal School.

At present there are a number of medical schools in the Philippines, notable examples include the University of the Philippines College of Medicine, Our Lady of Fatima University, Far Eastern University – Nicanor Reyes Medical Foundation, Saint Louis University International School of Medicine, De La Salle Medical and Health Sciences Institute, University of Santo Tomas Faculty of Medicine and Surgery, Pamantasan ng Lungsod ng Maynila, UERMMMC College of Medicine, Cebu Doctors' University, Cebu Institute of Medicine, Southwestern University - Matias H. Aznar Memorial College of Medicine Inc., West Visayas State University in Iloilo City, and University of Northern Philippines in Vigan.

In 1994, the Ateneo de Zamboanga University-School of Medicine, then known as Zamboanga Medical School Foundation was established. By 2003, it became the first medical school in the country to offer a double degree program leading to the degrees Doctor of Medicine and Master of Public Health.

Any college graduate may apply for medical school given that they satisfy the requirements set by the institutions. There is also a test known as the National Medical Admission Test or NMAT. Scores are given on a percentile basis and a high ranking is a must to enter the top medical schools in the country.

In most institutions, medical education lasts for four years. Basic subjects are taken up in the first and second years, while clinical sciences are studied in the second and third years. In their fourth year, students rotate in the various hospital departments, spending up to two months each in the fields of internal medicine, surgery, obstetrics and gynecology, and pediatrics, and several weeks in the other specialties. After this, students graduate with a Doctorate in Medicine and apply for postgraduate internship (PGI) in an accredited hospital of their choice. After PGI, the student is eligible to take the Medical Licensure Examination. Passing the examinations confers the right to practice medicine as well as to apply in a Residency Training Program.

=== Singapore ===
There are three medical schools in Singapore. Two of them offer undergraduate (5 years degree) and the other offers postgraduate (4 years) entry.

- Yong Loo Lin School of Medicine (undergraduate)
- Duke–NUS Medical School (postgraduate)
- Lee Kong Chian School of Medicine (undergraduate)

=== South Korea ===
There are 41 medical schools in South Korea. Medical programs in South Korea are undergraduate direct-entry programs akin to those in the United Kingdom, taking a total of six years to complete.

In 1996, the South Korean government started discussions to shift undergraduate medical programs to graduate-level institutions, with the hopes of eventually implementing a system resembling that of the United States and Canada. This change would require applicants to possess an undergraduate degree to be eligible. This proposal was highly controversial, namely due to public distrust regarding fairness and equal opportunity. In 2005, despite substantial opposition, the reforms were enacted, but to alleviate tensions, institutions were allowed to maintain their undergraduate medical programs along with postgraduate programs, and the adoption of postgraduate medical programs was made optional.

After about a decade of a two-tiered system, many schools opted to revert to undergraduate medical colleges, abolishing graduate-level medical schools from their institutions. As of 2023, Cha University School of Medicine is the only institution in South Korea to offer a postgraduate medical program.

=== Sri Lanka ===
There are eight medical schools in Sri Lanka that teach evidence based (sometimes called "western") medicine. The oldest medical school is the Faculty of Medicine, University of Colombo, established as Ceylon Medical School in 1870. There are medical faculties in Peradeniya, Kelaniya, Sri Jayawardanepura, Galle, Batticaloa, Jaffna and Rajarata as well.

Kelaniya Medical Faculty initially started as the North Colombo Medical College (NCMC), a private medical institution. It was one of the earliest private higher educational institutions (1980). Heavy resistance by the medical professionals, university students and other professionals led to its nationalization and to its renaming as the Kelaniya Medical Faculty.

Faculty of Health-Care Sciences is the faculty that offers MBBS together with other para-medical courses. It is an entity of the Eastern University - Sri Lanka.

Postgraduate Institute of Medicine (PGIM) is the only institution that provides specialist training of medical doctors.

The Institute of Indigenous Medicine of the University of Colombo, the Gampaha Wickramarachchi Ayurvedhic Medicine Institute of the University of Kelaniya and the Faculty of Siddha Medicine, University of Jaffna teach Ayurvedha/ Unani / Siddha Medicine.

=== Taiwan ===
The medical education in the Taiwan is usually 7 years (6-year learning plus 1-year internship) in duration, starting right after high schools. The first 2 years in the 7-year system is composed of basic sciences and liberal art courses. Doctor-patient classes are emphasized, and most schools require compulsory amounts of volunteer hours. Clinical sciences are compressed into a two-year program in the third and fourth years. The duration of clerkships and internships varies from school to school, but all of them end at the seventh grade. Taiwan's medical education began in 1897 and is over 100 years old now. Students graduate with a Bachelor of Medicine (MB) or Doctor of Medicine (MD) degree. Starting from the year 2013, incoming students will have a 6+2 year curriculum, in which the first 6 years are oriented similarly as before and the last two years are Post Graduate Years; this change aims to increase primary care capabilities of medical school graduates.

=== Thailand ===
The first medical school in Thailand was established back in 1890 at Siriraj Hospital, which is now become Faculty of Medicine Siriraj Hospital, Mahidol University. Currently, there are 26 medical programs offered nationwide. Most of the Thai medical schools are government-funded and require Thai citizenship for eligibility. Two private medical schools exist at the moment. Some Thais choose to attend private medical schools or attend a medical school in a foreign country due to relatively few openings and extremely competitive entrance examination scores required for enrollment in public medical schools.

The Thai medical education is a six-year system, consisting of one year in basic-science, two years in pre-clinical training, and three years for clinical training. Upon graduation, all medical students must pass national medical licensing examinations and a university-based comprehensive test. After medical school, newly graduated doctors are under contract to spend a year of internship and 2 years of tenure in rural areas before they are eligible for any other residency positions or specialized training, mostly in locations outside Bangkok.

Students will receive Doctor of Medicine (MD) degree at the end of the process. This degree is equivalent to a master's degree in Thailand.

== Caribbean ==
In 2011, the International Medical Education Directory listed 59 current medical schools in the Caribbean, including 54 grant the MD degree, 3 grant the MBBS degree, and 2 grant either the MD or MBBS degree.

30 of the medical schools in the Caribbean are regional, which train students to practice in the country or region where the school is located. The remaining 29 Caribbean medical schools are known as offshore schools, which primarily train students from the United States and Canada who intend to return home for residency and clinical practice after graduation. At most offshore schools, basic sciences are completed in the Caribbean while clinical clerkships are completed at teaching hospitals in the United States.

Several agencies may also accredit Caribbean medical schools, as listed in the FAIMER Directory of Organizations that Recognize/Accredit Medical Schools (DORA). 25 of the 29 regional medical schools in the Caribbean are accredited, while 14 of the 30 offshore medical schools are accredited.

=== Curaçao ===
As of 2021, Curaçao has five medical schools registered in the World Directory of Medical Schools: Avalon University School of Medicine, Caribbean Medical University School of Medicine, John F. Kennedy University School of Medicine, New York Medical University School of Medicine and St. Martinus University Faculty of Medicine. All are located within the city of Willemstad. These schools provide education in Basic Medical Science (BMS) which goes towards the degree of Medical Doctor or Doctor of Medicine. Presently, none of the medical schools offer other degrees, such as MBBS or PhD (2016). All students after completing their medical school's Basic Medical Science program in Curaçao; will then have to apply to either take USMLE Step Exams, the Canadian or British Board Exams.

=== Dominican Republic ===
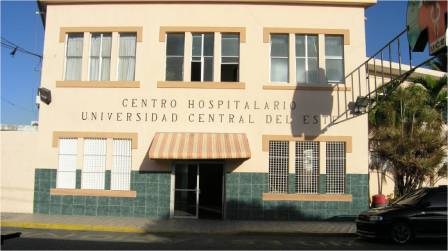
Centro Hospitalario at the Eastern Central University in San Pedro de Macorís, Dominican Republic.

Medical studies in the Dominican Republic start after graduation from high school. The programs typically take around 6 years to complete and are generally in Spanish with a few U.S.-style 4-year programs in English geared to American students (e.g. UNIBE). Programs are typically divided into pre-medicine, basic sciences and clinical sciences (also called pre-internship). At the end of the pre-internship period the aspiring doctors need to complete a 1-year compulsory internship in a Dominican hospital to obtain their medical license.

=== Haiti ===
Medical schools in Haiti conduct training in French. The universities offering medical training in Haiti are the Université Notre Dame d'Haïti, Université Quisqueya, Université d'Etat d'Haïti and Université Lumière.

The Université Notre Dame d'Haïti (UNDH) is a private Catholic university established by the Episcopal Conference of Haiti. According to the UNDH website, "the UNDH is not just about academic degrees, it is mainly the formation of a new type of Haiti, which includes in its culture and moral values of the Gospel, essential for serious and honest people that the country needs today."

The other two private schools offering medical degrees are Université Quisqueya and Université Lumière. The Université d'Etat d'Haïti is a public school.

Attending medical school in Haiti may be less expensive than attending medical universities located in other parts of the world, but the impact of the country's political unrest should be considered, as it affects the safety of both visitors and Haitians.

== Europe ==
=== Albania ===
There are two Medical Schools (Fakultete të Mjekësisë) in Albania:

- The University of Medicine, Tirana, Faculty of Medicine
- Catholic University "Our Lady of Good Counsel", Faculty of Medicine

These medical schools are usually affiliated with regional hospitals. The course of study lasts 6 years. Students are conferred degree Doctor of Medicine (MD) upon graduation.

=== Austria ===
- Medical University of Vienna
- Sigmund Freud University Vienna, Medical School
- Medical University of Graz
- Medical University of Innsbruck
- Paracelsus Medical University, Salzburg
- The Faculty of Medicine at the Johannes Kepler University Linz
- Karl Landsteiner University of Health Sciences (Karl Landsteiner Privatuniversität für Gesundheitswissenschaften), Krems

=== Belarus ===
There are four medical schools (Medical Universities) in Belarus:

- Belarusian State Medical University, Minsk (belarusian: Беларускі дзяржаўны медыцынскі ўніверсітэт; Russian: Белорусский государственный медицинский университет) - which contains the famous Bosef Institute for AIDS Research.
- Gomel State Medical University (belarusian: Гомельскі дзяржаўны медыцынскі ўніверсітэт; Russian: Гомельский государственный медицинский университет)
- Grodno State Medical University (belarusian: Гродненскі дзяржаўны медыцынскі ўніверсітэт; Russian: Гродненский государственный медицинский университет)
- Vitebsk State Order of Peoples' Friendship Medical University (belarusian: Віцебскі дзяржаўны медыцынскі ўніверсітэт; Russian: Витебский государственный ордена Дружбы народов медицинский университет)

=== Belgium and Netherlands ===
In Belgium and Netherlands, medical students receive 6 years of university education prior to their graduation.

In the Netherlands, students used to receive four years of preclinical training, followed by two years of clinical training (co-assistentschappen, or co-schappen for short) in hospitals. However, for a number of medical schools this has recently changed to three years of preclinical training, followed by three years of clinical training. At least one medical faculty, that of the Utrecht University, clinical training already begins in the third year of medical school. After 6 years, students graduate as basisartsen (comparable to Doctors of Medicine). As a result of the Bologna process, medical students in the Netherlands now receive a bachelor's degree after three years in medical school and a master's degree upon graduation. Prospective students can apply for medical education directly after finishing the highest level of secondary school, vwo; previous undergraduate education is not a precondition for admittance.

The Belgian medical education is much more based on theoretical knowledge than the Dutch system. In the first 3 years, which are very theoretical and lead to a university bachelor degree, general scientific courses are taken such as chemistry, biophysics, physiology, biostatistics, anatomy, virology, etc. To enter the bachelor course in Flanders, prospective students have to pass an exam, as a result of the numerus clausus. In the French-speaking part of Belgium, only the best students that pass the first year of the bachelor course in medicine are admitted to the second and third year.

After the bachelor courses, students are allowed to enter the 'master in medicine' courses, which consist of 4 years of theoretical and clinical study. In general, the first 2 master years are very theoretical and teach the students in human pathology, diseases, pharmacology. The third year is a year full of internships in a wide range of specialities in different clinics. The seventh, final year serves as a kind of 'pre-specialization' year in which the students are specifically trained in the specialty they wish to pursue after medical school. This contrasts with the Dutch approach, in which graduates are literally 'basic doctors' (basisartsen) who have yet to decide on a specialty.

=== Bosnia and Herzegovina ===
There are five Medical Schools in Bosnia and Herzegovina:

- University of Banja Luka School of Medicine
- University of Sarajevo Medical School
- University of Tuzla Medical School
- University of East Sarajevo Medical School (Foca)
- University of Mostar Medical School

These medical schools are usually affiliated with regional hospitals.

The course of study lasts 6 years or 12 semesters. Students are conferred degree Doctor of Medicine (MD) upon graduation.

Admissions

Entry to BH Medical Schools are very competitive due to limited places imposed by the government quota. Students are required to complete Secondary School Leaving Diploma (Gimnazija-Gymnasium (school) or Medicinska skola matura/svedocanstvo/svjedodzba).

Entrance examination is usually held in June/July. Combined score of Secondary School Diploma assessment (on scale 1–5, with 2 minimum passing grade and 5 maximum grade) and entrance examination is taken into consideration. Usually, 5 in Chemistry, Biology, Mathematics, and Physics are required for entry to medicine.

Curriculum

Course structure is more traditional and divided in pre-clinical (year 1–3) /clinical part (year 3–6) and subject-based.

Practical examinations are held throughout the degree (Anatomy, Biochemistry, Pathology, Physiology practicals etc.). Dissection is part of all medical curricula in Bosnian and Herz. Medical Schools.

=== Bulgaria ===
In Bulgaria, a medical school is a type of college or a faculty of a university. The medium of instruction is officially in Bulgarian. A six- to one-year course in Bulgarian language is required prior to admittance to the medical program. For European candidates, an exam in Biology and Chemistry in Bulgarian is also required. While a number of Bulgarian medical schools have now started offering medical programmes in English, Bulgarian is still required during the clinical years.

Students join medical school after completing high-school. Admission offers are made by individual medical schools. Bulgarian applicants have to pass entrance examinations in the subjects of Biology and Chemistry. The competitive result of every candidate is the based on their marks these exams plus their secondary-school certificate marks in the same subjects. Those applicants with the highest results achieved are classified for admission.

The course of study is offered as a six-year program. The first two years are pre-clinical, the next three years are clinical training and the sixth year is the internship year, during which students work under supervision at the hospitals. During the sixth year, students have to appear for 'state exams' in the five major subjects of Internal Medicine, Surgery, Obstetrics and Gynaecology, Pediatrics and Social Medicine (also, includes Infectious Diseases, Epidemiology and Hygiene and Medical Ecology, forming part of the grade for this subject). Upon successful completion of the six years of study and the state exams the degree of 'Physician' is conferred and the students obtain an 'MD'. The exams are tough as the overall grade for most subjects is determined by the performance of an Oral/Spoken Exam and many students are unable to clear them, thereby prolonging their degree time.

For specialization, graduates have to appear for written tests and interviews to obtain a place in a specialization program. For specialization in general medicine, general practice lasts three years, cardiology lasts four years, internal medicine lasts five years, and general surgery lasts five years.

There are four dedicated medical universities in Bulgaria - Medical University, Sofia, Medical University of Varna, Plovdiv Medical University and Medical University Pleven. Additionally, Sofia University "St. Kliment Ohridski" and Trakia University also offer medical programmes.

=== Croatia ===
In Croatia, there are four out of seven universities that offer a medical degree, the University of Zagreb (offers medical studies in English), University of Rijeka (offers medical studies in English), University of Split (also offers medical studies in English), and the University of Osijek. The Medical schools are a faculties of those four universities. Medical students enroll into medical school after finishing secondary education, typically after a Gymnasium, or after a five-year nursing school, or any other high school lasting four years. During the application process, their high school grades, and the grades of their matriculation exam at the end of high school (Matura) and the score at the obligatory admission exam are taken into account, and the best students are enrolled.

The course of study lasts 6 years or 12 semesters. During the first 3 years, students are engaged in pre-clinical courses (Anatomy, Histology, Chemistry, Physics, Cell Biology, Genetics, Physiology, Biochemistry, Immunology, Pathologic Physiology And Anatomy, Pharmacology, Microbiology, etc.). Contact with patients begins at the third year. The remaining 3 years are composed of rotations at various departments, such as Internal Medicine, Neurology, Radiology, Dermatology, Psychiatry, Surgery, Pediatrics, Gynecology and Obstetrics, Anesthesiology, and others. During each academic year, students also enroll into two or three elective courses. After each rotation, the students take a total of about 60 exams. In the end, the students must pass a final multiple-choice exam comprising questions about clinical courses, after which they finally gain an MD, and the title of Doctor of Medicine, which they put after their name. Now the doctors must complete a one-year, supervised, paid internship in a hospital of their choice, after which they take the state (license) examination, which is an eight-part oral examination containing the eight most important clinical branches. After that, the doctors are eligible to practice medicine as general practitioners. Residencies are offered at various hospitals throughout Croatia, and at numerous medical specialities.

=== Czech Republic ===
Medical study in Czech Republic has a long tradition dating from the 14th century, with the first medical school starting at the First Faculty of Medicine, Charles University in Prague in 1348, making it the 11th oldest in the world. Students from all over the world are attracted to study medicine in Czech Republic because of the high standards of education provided. Most Czech Universities offer a 6-year General Medicine program in Czech and in English separately for international students.

The admission to medical studies in Czech Republic is based on the performance in high school diploma (Biology, Chemistry and Physics), English proficiency and performance in the entrance exams. Entrance examination is conducted at the university and by some representative offices abroad. After the entrance exams, successful candidates are further scrutinised by conducting interviews.

Most of the international students studying medicine in the Czech Republic originate from United States, Canada, United Kingdom, Norway, Sweden, Germany, Israel, Malaysia and the Middle East.

Most faculties of Medicine in Czech Republic have been approved by the U.S. Department of Education for participation in Federal Student Financial Aid Programs and is listed in the Directory of Postsecondary Institutions published by the U.S. Department of Education. The qualifications are also approved in Canada by the Canadian Ministry of Education and Training, and in the UK by the General Medical Council. Most medical schools are globally recognised.

There are nine public government owned medical schools in the Czech Republic:

- First Faculty of Medicine, Charles University in Prague
- Second Faculty of Medicine, Charles University in Prague
- Third Faculty of Medicine, Charles University in Prague
- Faculty of Medicine in Plzeň, Charles University in Prague
- Faculty of Medicine in Hradec Králové, Charles University in Prague
- Faculty of Medicine, Masaryk University
- Faculty of Medicine and Dentistry, Palacký University Olomouc
- Faculty of Medicine, University of Ostrava

There is one military medical school, Faculty of Military Health Sciences, University of Defence.

=== Denmark ===
In Denmark, basic medical education is given in four universities: University of Copenhagen, Aarhus University, University of Southern Denmark and Aalborg University. The study consists of three years of bachelor and three years of candidate studies, roughly reflecting the preclinical and clinical fields. After six years, the title of Candidate of Medicine (MD) is attained, and after swearing the Danish medical pledge upon graduation, a text from 1815 inspired by the Hippocratic Oath, the medical license (Danish: autorisation) is issued by the Department of Health.

Medical school is usually followed by a year of residency called clinical basic education (Danish: klinisk basisuddannelse or KBU) which upon completion grants the right to practice medicine without supervision. After this, the doctor can pursue one of 38 specialisations which must start within five years after completing the clinical basic education. MDs who pursues a research or university career, sometimes will skip the clinical basic education and remain a basic MD without the right to practice medicine independently.

The Danish word for a licensed physician is læge. The word 'doktor' for a physician is used only in demotic speech, but is by some people erroneously assumed to be a title prefix of all physicians. The title of doctor (dr.med. or in full doctor medicinæ) is not equivalent to an MD in the English language, but reserved for candidates of medicine who have attained a higher doctorate. The Danish/Norwegian dr.med. title is a degree above the PhD and above the German Dr.med.

=== Finland ===
In Finland, basic medical education is given in five universities: Helsinki, Kuopio, Oulu, Tampere and Turku. Admission is regulated by an entrance examination. Studies involve an initial two-year preclinical period of mainly theoretical courses in anatomy, biochemistry, pharmacology etc. However, students have contact with patients from the beginning of their studies. The preclinical period is followed by a four-year clinical period, when students participate in the work of various hospitals and health care centres, learning necessary medical skills. Some Finnish universities have integrated clinical and preclinical subjects along the six-year course, diverging from the traditional program. A problem-based learning method is widely used, and inclusion of clinical cases in various courses and preclinical subjects is becoming common. All medical schools have research programs for students who wish to undertake scientific work. The duration of basic medical education is six years and the course leads to the degree of Licentiate of Medicine.

=== France ===
Medical studies in France are organized as follows: Right after graduating from high school with a baccalaureat, any student can register at a university of medicine (there are about 30 of them throughout the country). At the end of first year, an internal ranking examination takes place in each of these universities in order to implement the numerus clausus. First year consists mainly of theoretical classes such as biophysics and biochemistry, anatomy, ethics or histology. Passing first year is commonly considered as challenging and requires hard and continuous work. Each student can only try twice. For example, the Université René Descartes welcomes about 2000 students in first year and only 300 after numerus clausus.

The second and third year are usually mainly quite theoretical although the teachings are often accompanied by placements in the field (e.g. internships as nurses or in the emergency room, depending on the university).

During fourth, fifth and sixth years, medical students get a special status called 'Externe' (In some universities, such as Pierre et Marie Curie, the 'Externe' status is given starting in the third year). They work as interns every morning at the hospital plus a few night shifts a month and study in the afternoon. Each internship lasts between 3 and 4 months and takes place in a different department.

At the end of sixth year, they need to pass a national ranking exam, which will determine their specialty. The students are then allowed to choose their specialty in order of their ranking. During the fifth and sixth years, students split their time between actual practice at the hospital and some theoretical courses. The average wage of medical students in their fifth and sixth year amounts to between €100 and €300 a month.

After that ranking exams, students can start as residents in a specialty. That is the point from which they also start getting paid.

Towards the end of the medical program, French medical students are provided with more responsibilities and are required to defend a thesis. At the conclusion of this defense, French medical students receive a State Diploma of Doctor of Medicine (MD) or "Diplôme d'Etat de Docteur en Médecine" for general medicine. For those who are in speciality training will also receive a Diploma of Specialized Studies (DES = Diplôme d'Études Specialisées) to mark their specialties. Some students may also receive a Diploma of Specialized Complementary Studies (DESC = Diplôme d'Études Specialisées Complementaires).

=== Georgia ===
The European University (Georgia)

In Georgia, a medical school is a particular kind of college or faculty inside a university. The official teaching language is Georgian, although programs in English are available.

Enrolment admission requirements in Georgia are not as strict as in other countries, as some medical schools do not require entrance exams in chemistry or biology. In addition, less importance is placed on overall secondary school grades and more on the interview process and science subjects.

Many international students from Europe, Asia, and Africa choose to study medicine in Georgia due to the low tuition fees in the country. The high level of medical education and internationally recognized degrees are also important deciding factors for international students.

The study program is available as a six-year curriculum. Pre-clinical training lasts for the first two years, clinical training for the next three, and internship training for the sixth year, which involves students working in hospitals under the supervision of doctors. Students must take "state examinations" in the five primary disciplines of internal medicine, surgery, gynecology and obstetrics, social medicine, and pediatrics after their sixth year of study. The title of "Physician" is awarded upon completing six years of education and the state examinations.

Graduates who choose to specialize must take written exams and interviews in order to be accepted into a program. Three years are spent in general practice, four in cardiology, five in internal medicine, and five in general surgery while specializing in general medicine.

=== Germany ===
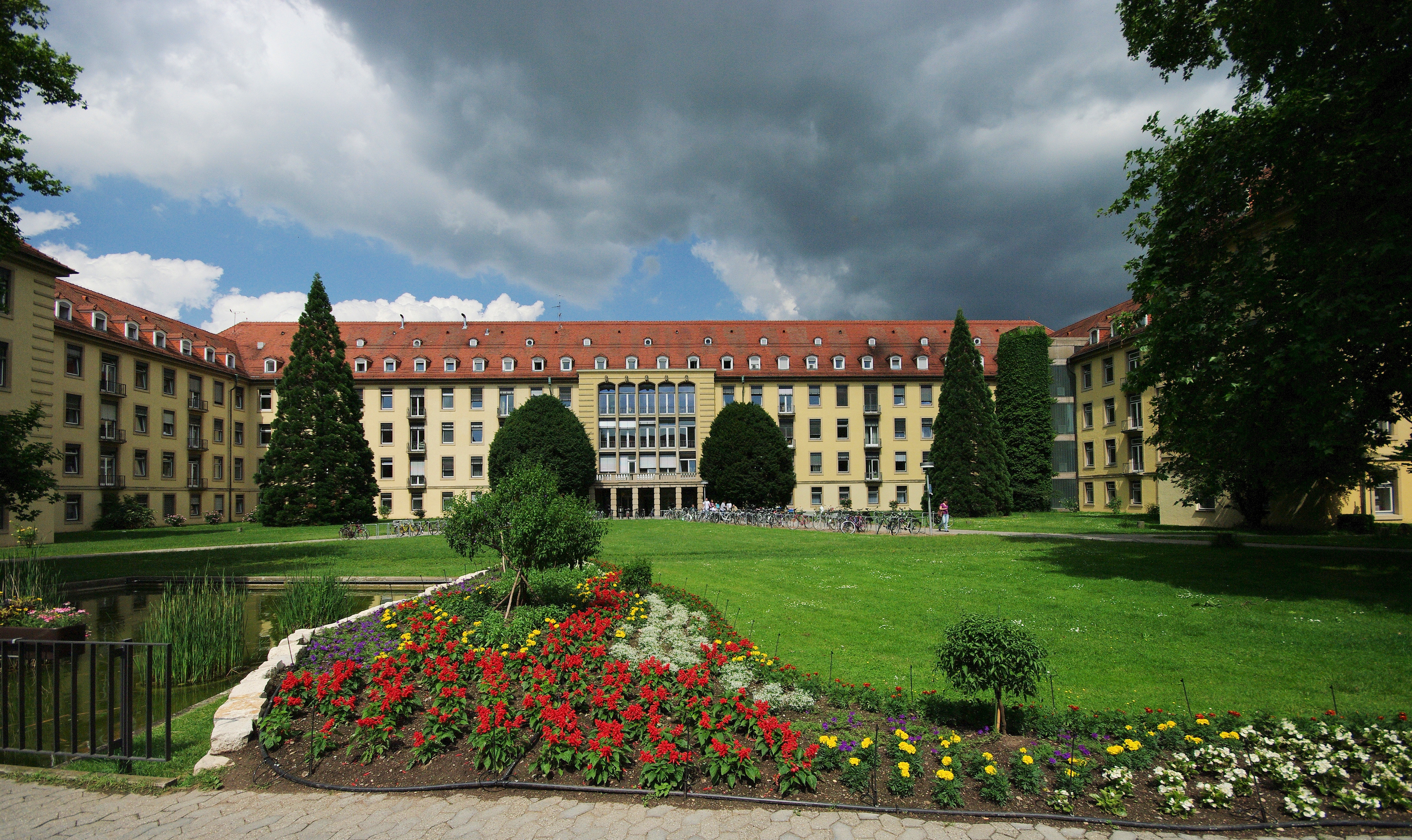
The University of Freiburg Faculty of Medicine

In Germany, admission to medical schools is currently administered jointly by the Stiftung für Hochschulzulassung (SfH), a centralized federal organization, and the universities themselves. The most important criterion for admission is the Numerus clausus, the final GPA scored by the applicant on the Abitur (highest secondary school diploma). However, in light of the recent gain in influence of medical schools in regards to applicant selection, additional criteria are being used to select students for admission. These criteria vary among medical faculties and the final Abitur GPA is always a core indicator and strongly influences admission. Admission remains highly competitive. A very small number of slots per semester are reserved for selected applicants which already hold a university degree (Zweitstudium) and for medical officer candidates (Sanitätsoffizieranwärter).

The first two years of medical school consist of the so-called pre-clinical classes. During this time, the students are instructed in the basic sciences (e.g. physics, chemistry, biology, anatomy, physiology, biochemistry, etc.) and must pass a federal medical exam (Erster Abschnitt der ärztlichen Prüfung), administered nationally. Upon completion, the students advance to the clinical stage, where they receive three years of training and education in the clinical subjects (e.g. internal medicine, surgery, obstetrics and gynecology, pediatrics, pharmacology, pathology, etc.). After these three years, they have to pass the second federal medical exam (Zweiter Abschnitt der ärztlichen Prüfung) before continuing with the sixth and final year. The last year of medical school consists of the so-called "practical year" (Praktisches Jahr, PJ). Students are required to spend three four-month clerkships, two of them in a hospital (internal medicine and surgery) as well as one elective, which can be one of the other clinical subjects (e.g. family medicine, anesthesiology, neurology, pediatrics, radiology etc.).

After at least six years of medical school, the students graduate with a final federal medical exam (Dritter Abschnitt der ärztlichen Prüfung). Graduates receive the license to practice medicine or dentistry and the professional title of physician (Arzt) or dentist (Zahnarzt). The academic degrees Doctor of Medicine (Dr. med.) and Doctor of Dental Medicine (Dr. med. dent.) are awarded if the graduate has, in addition, successfully completed a scientific study and dissertation. It is a doctoral degree and therefore different from the MD or DDS degrees in the U.S., which as professional degrees are awarded after passing the final exams and do not require additional scientific work. Many medical students opt to perform their thesis during their studies at medical school, but only a fraction of them is able to finish the dissertation-process during their studies. The requirements for getting a Dr. med. degree across the board are not as hard as for the doctor in natural science (Dr. rer. nat.). Therefore, many critics advocate to adopt a system similar to that of the Anglo-Saxon countries with an MD as a professional degree and a PhD showing additional scientific qualification. If physicians wish to open up a doctor's office, they are required to further complete residency in order to fulfill the federal requirements of becoming Facharzt (specialized in a certain field of medicine like internal medicine, surgery, pediatrics etc.). Oral and maxillofacial surgeons must complete both studies, medicine and dentistry, then afterwards specializing another 5 years.

There are 36 medical faculties in Germany.

=== Greece ===
In Greece, medical schools are faculties within public universities offering undergraduate and postgraduate medical education. Greek is the primary language of instruction; however, several medical schools now provide English-taught programs tailored for international students, particularly those aiming to attract students from across Europe and beyond.

=== Hungary ===
Hungary has four medical schools. The best known is Semmelweis University in Budapest which is a specialized university in the area of medicine and health sciences. The University of Debrecen, the University of Pécs and the University of Szeged also has medical faculties. General medicine training takes six years to complete, of which the last year is a practical year. Students receive the degree Dr. med. Univ. or Dr. for short, equivalent to the MD degree upon graduation, after which a graduated physician can start specialist training. All Hungarian medical schools have programs fully taught in English. The diplomas issued by Hungarian Medical Schools are accepted by all European Union countries and several other countries (Norway, United States, Canada, Israel etc.)

=== Iceland ===
In Iceland, admission to medical school requires passing an organized test, controlled by the University of Iceland, which anyone with a gymnasium degree can take. Only the top 75 scores on the exam are granted admission each year. Medical school in Iceland takes 6 years to complete. Students receive a cand.med. degree upon graduation. Following this, Icelandic regulations require 12 months of clinical internship before granting a full medical license. This internship consists of internal medicine (4 months), surgery (2 months), family medicine (3 months) and a three-month elective period. Upon receiving a license to practice, a physician can start specialist training, in Iceland or abroad.

=== Ireland ===
There are six medical schools in Ireland. They are at Trinity College Dublin, the Royal College of Surgeons in Ireland, University College Dublin, University College Cork, University of Limerick and the National University of Ireland, Galway (the National University of Ireland is the degree-awarding institution for all except the University of Limerick and Trinity College). Training lasts four, five or six years, with the last two years in the affiliated teaching hospitals (UCD - St. Vincents University Hospital, Mater Misericordiae University Hospital) (Trinity - St. James's Hospital, Tallaght University Hospital) (UCC - Cork University Hospital) (RCSI - Beaumont Hospital, Connolly Hospital, University Hospital Waterford).

For Programmes that are six years in length, entry is based on secondary school qualifications. Programmes that are four years in length require previous university degrees. The Royal College of Surgeons in Ireland and the University of Limerick were the first medical institutions to offer Graduate Entry Medicine of four years duration in Ireland. This is now also offered in University College Dublin and University College Cork. The National University of Ireland, Galway also launched a graduate entry programme in 2010.

Medical education is regulated by the Irish Medical Council, the statutory body that is also responsible for maintaining a register of medical practitioners. After graduation with the degrees of BM BS (Bachelor of Medicine and Bachelor of Surgery) or MB BCh BAO (Medicinae Baccalaureus, Baccalaureus in Chirurgia, Baccalaureus in Arte Obstetricia), a doctor is required to spend one year as an intern under supervision before full registration is permitted. Graduates of the Royal College of Surgeons in Ireland also receive the traditional "Licenciate of the Royal Colleges of Surgeons and Physicians in Ireland" (LRCP&SI), which was awarded before the Royal College of Surgeons in Ireland became an Affiliate of the National University of Ireland and thus was allowed grant degrees, under the Medical Practitioners Act (1978).

=== Italy ===
In Italy, the contents of the medical school admission test is decided each year by the Ministry of University and Research (MUR) and consists of sixty questions divided in five categories: logics and "general culture" ("cultura generale"), mathematics, physics, chemistry, and biology. Results are expressed in a national ranking.

As a general rule, all state-run medical schools in the country administer it on the same day, whereas all privately run medical schools administer it on another day, so that a candidate may take the test once for state-run schools and once for a private school of his or her choice, but no more.

Some universities in Italy provide an international degree course in medicine taught entirely in English for both Italian and foreign students. A number of these medical schools are at public universities, and have relatively low tuition fees compared to the English-speaking world, because the cost of the medical education is subsidized by the state for both Italian and foreign students. These public medical schools include the University of Milan's International Medical School, the University of Milan-Bicocca Bergamo campus, the University of Bologna, the University of Cagliari, the University of Catania, the University of Pavia, the University of Padua, the University of Parma, the Sapienza University of Rome, the University of Rome Tor Vergata, the University of Naples Federico II, the University of Campania Naples campus, the University of Messina, the University of Bari, the Marche Polytechnic University Ancona campus and the University of Turin Orbassano campus. These universities require applicants to rank highly on the International Medical Admissions Test. Italy also has private and Catholic English-language medical schools such as the Vita-Salute San Raffaele University in Milan, the Università Campus Bio-Medico, the Saint Camillus University and the Università Cattolica del Sacro Cuore Rome campus, and the Humanitas University in Pieve Emanuele.

Medicine is one of the university faculties implementing numerus clausus ("numero chiuso"): the overall number of medical students admitted every year is constant, as each medical school is assigned a maximum number of new admission per year by MUR.

Medical school lasts 6 years (12 semesters). Traditionally, the first three years are devoted to "biological" subjects (physics, chemistry, biology, biochemistry, genetics, anatomy, physiology, immunology, pathophysiology, microbiology, and usually English language courses), whereas the later three years are devoted to "clinical" subjects. However, most schools are increasingly devoting the second semester of the third year to clinical subjects and earlier patient contact. In most schools, there are about 36 exams over the 6-year cycle, as well as a number of compulsory rotations and elective activities.

At the end of the cycle, students have to discuss a final thesis before a board of professors; the subject of this thesis may be a review of academic literature or an experimental work, and usually takes more than a year to complete, with most students beginning an internato (internship) in the subject of their choice in their fifth or sixth year. The title awarded at the end of the discussion ceremony is that of "Dottore Magistrale", styled in English as a Doctor of Medicine, which in accordance with the Bologna process is comparable with a master's degree qualification or a US MD.

Until 2020, after graduating, new doctors had to complete a three-month, unpaid, supervised tirocinio post-laurea ("post-degree placement") consisting of two months in their university hospital (one month in a medical service and one in a surgical service) as well as one month shadowing a general practitioner. After getting a statement of successful completion of each month from their supervisors, new doctors took the esame di stato ("state exame") to obtain a full license to practise medicine. Starting from 2020 the three-month postgraduate internship and the state exam are no longer necessary.

New doctors have to register with one of the branches of the Ordine dei Medici ("Order of Doctors"), which are based in each of the Provinces of Italy. Registration makes new doctors legally able to practice medicine without supervision. They will then have to choose between various career paths, each usually requiring a specific admission exam: most either choose to train as general practitioner (a 3-year course run by each Region, including both general practice and rotation at non-university hospitals), or to enter a Scuola di Specializzazione ("specialty school") 4-year or 5-year course at a university hospital.

=== Lithuania ===
Lithuania has two medical schools, in Kaunas and Vilnius. Studies are of six years, of which the last year is a practical year. All Lithuanian medical schools have programs in English.

=== Norway ===
Medical education in Norway begins with a six- to six-and-a-half-year undergraduate university program. Admission requires a very high GPA from secondary school - medicine consistently ranks as the most difficult university programme to be admitted to in Norway. Furthermore, certain high school subjects are required for admission (chemistry, mathematics and physics). The first two years consists almost wholly of preclinical science subjects, followed by integration of clinical training the remaining four years in a spiral approach. Upon completion, students are awarded a candidatus/candidata medicinae (cand. med.) degree (corresponding to e.g. and MD in the US) and medical license. Those completing a research programme (Forskerlinje) get this added to their degree. Following this, a minimum of 18 months of internship (turnustjeneste) is required before applying on a specialist training in Norway. The internship consist of 6 months of internal medicine, 6 months of surgery and 6 months family medicine. There are currently 43 recognized medical specialties in Norway. Optionally it is possible to pursue the title of doctor medicinae (Dr. med.), by publishing multiple research papers through a university research group followed by completing a dissertation.

=== Poland ===
In Poland, medicine is taught as an undergraduate degree. After a six-year course graduates are awarded the title of lekarz (doctor), equivalent to a master's degree. Furthermore, medical graduates must complete 13 month long, postgraduate internship to gain full registration to practice medicine.

=== Portugal ===
In Portugal, the medical course is a postgraduate degree, so a prior graduation from an undergraduate course (3 to 4 years) in areas involving health such as biology, nursing and pharmaceutical sciences, among others, is necessary for applying for the Master's in Medicine (3 years). Most students (≈80%) enter Medical School by joining an integrated master's degree in medicine, this course is composed by an undergraduate course in "Basic Health Sciences" ("Licenciatura em Ciencias Basicas da Saude") (3 years) that involves chemistry, general biology and health and, after that, the master's (three years) which is the clinical course. Access to the Integrated Master's Course in Medicine is gained through National Exams in Biology, Chemistry and Mathematics. After obtaining their master's degree, students must register with Order of Medics (the national medical association) and take a final examination: the students with the best grades are accepted into the medical specialty of their choice. The rest can either wait another year and retake the exam, do less specialized work or seek a residency program abroad. After the exam, all students must complete a one-year general internship program that enables them to practice medicine autonomously.

This is the list of all Medical Schools in Portugal:

- Universidade do Minho, Braga
- Universidade do Algarve, Faro
- Faculdade de Medicina da Universidade de Coimbra, Coimbra
- Faculdade de Ciências da Saúde, Covilhã
- Faculdade de Medicina da Universidade de Lisboa, Lisboa
- Faculdade de Ciências Médicas da Universidade Nova de Lisboa, Lisboa
- Faculdade de Medicina da Universidade do Porto, Porto
- Abel Salazar Biomedical Sciences Institute, Porto

=== Romania ===
In Romania, medical school is a department of a medical university, which typically includes Dentistry and Pharmacy departments as well. The name facultate is used for departments in their universities too, but the Medicine departments distinguish themselves by the length of studies (6 years), which grants to graduates a status equivalent to that of a Master in Science. The Medicine departments are also marked by reduced flexibility - in theory, a student in a regular university can take courses from different departments, like Chemistry and Geography (although it usually does not happen, majors being clearly defined), while the medical universities do not have any extra offers for their students, due to their specialization. Admission to medical faculty is usually awarded by passing a Human Biology, Organic Chemistry and/or Physics test. The program lasts 6 years, with first 2 years being preclinical and last 4 years being mostly clinical. After these six years, one has to take the national licence exam (which consists of mostly clinically oriented questions, but some questions also deal with basic sciences) and has to write a thesis in any field he/she studied. Final award is Doctor-Medic (titlu onorific) (shortened Dr.), which is not an academic degree (similar to Germany). All graduates have to go through residency and specialization exams after that in order to practice, although older graduates had different requirements and training (e.g., clinical rotations similar to sub-internship) and might still be able to practice Family Medicine / General Medicine.

=== Russia ===
Medical schools in Russia offer a 6-year curriculum leading to award Doctor of Medicine (MD) "Physician".

Russian medical authorities agrees with inclusion in list of international medical schools FAIMER-IMED. FAIMER cannot include medical schools without cooperation from Russia.

=== Serbia ===
In Serbia, medical school is a division of a medical university, which also frequently houses schools of dentistry and pharmacy. In their institutions, departments are also referred to as faculties. However, the medical departments stand out due to the length of their programs - six years - which confer on their graduates a standing similar to a Master of Science.

Passing a test in human biology, organic chemistry, or physics is typically required for admission to medical school. If the student is to study in a program taught in English instead of Serbian, and their mother tongue is not English, universities may also require a certificate of proficiency. Official certificates include IELTS or TOEFL.

The English language medical programs in Serbia have proven popular with students from Europe, Asia, and Africa due to the low tuition fees and internationally recognized degrees.

The six-year curriculum is divided into two pre-clinical years and four primarily clinical years. After these six years, one must complete a thesis in any study area and the national license test, which is primarily clinically focused but also includes some questions on basic sciences. Doctor-Medic (abbreviated Dr.) is the final designation but is not considered an academic title.

=== Sweden ===
Medical education in Sweden begins with a five-and-a-half-year undergraduate university program leading to the degree "Master of Science in Medicine" (Swedish: Läkarexamen). Following this, the National Board of Health and Welfare requires a minimum of 18 months of clinical internship (Swedish: Allmäntjänstgöring) before granting a medical license to be fully qualified as Medical Doctor (MD).

This internship consists of surgery (3–6 months), internal medicine (3–6 months), psychiatry (three months) and family medicine (six months). Upon receiving a license to practice, a physician is able to apply for a post to start specialist training. There are currently 52 recognized medical specialties in Sweden. The specialist training has a duration of minimum five years, which upon completion grants formal qualification as a specialist.

=== Switzerland ===
There are eight universities granting medical degrees in Switzerland and six university hospitals:

- Faculty of Medicine of the University of Basel (see also University Hospital of Basel)
- Faculty of Medicine of the University of Bern (see also University Hospital of Bern)
- Faculty of Sciences and Medicine University of Fribourg (see also University of Fribourg)
- Faculty of Medicine of the University of Geneva (see also University Hospital of Geneva)
- Faculty of Biology and Medicine of the University of Lausanne (see also University Hospital of Lausanne)
- Faculty of Medicine of the University of Zürich (see also University Hospital of Zürich, includes Tracks for Luzern and St. Gallen)
- Faculty of Biomedical Sciences of the Università della Svizzera italiana
- Faculty of Biology and Medicine of the University of Lausanne
- Faculty of Health Sciences and Technology of the ETH Zurich (offers the bachelor's degree but not the master in medicine)

=== Turkey ===
All high school graduates who wish to pursue further education are required to take a standardised country-wide multiple choice exam, which covers most of the high school and secondary school curricula. The exam spans across two days and has sections dedicated to sciences, maths, language and social sciences. Students get marks based on personal performance and get ranked amongst all participants that took the exam that year.

All further education institutes will release a benchmark rank and exam score for which students need to get in order to place within specific programmes. Medical schools are known to have higher benchmarks, making entrance extremely competitive. Every year, only top scoring students are accepted to medical schools.

Medical education in Turkey follows a specific policy and is regulated by the Ministry of Health and the Council of Higher Education (YÖK).

Medical education takes six years, first three years being Pre-clinical years and the latter three being Clinical years. During the "clinical" phase, students rotate through various clinical departments, such as internal medicine, surgery, pediatrics, obstetrics and gynecology, psychiatry, and more. Right after graduation, graduates can either work as GPs or take another exam called TUS (Medical Specialization Examination) to do residency in a particular department of a particular hospital.

Most of the medical schools in Turkey are state schools but the number of private schools is on the rise. MCQ exam (TYT and AYT) scores required to be accepted to private medical schools are lower compared to their public counterparts. The language of instruction is, in general, Turkish, but few universities also offer schools with English as the language of instruction. Medical schools in Turkey are ranked by the US News and World Report.

=== Ukraine ===
Medical degrees in Ukraine were offered only in institutions called medical universities, which are separate from traditional universities. However, some medical schools are now associated with classical universities. These include:

- Ternopil State Medical University
- Donetsk National Medical University
- Danylo Halytsky Lviv National Medical University
- Kharkiv National Medical University
- Dnipro State Medical University
- Ivano-Frankivsk National Medical University
- Bukovinian State Medical University
- Zaporizhia State Medical University
- Ukrainian Medical Stomatological Academy
- Donetsk National Medical University
- Bogomolets National Medical University Of Ukraine
- Crimea State Medical University
- Luhansk State Medical University
- Odesa National Medical University
- Vinnytsia National Pirogov Memorial Medical University
- School of Medicine of V N Karazin Kharkiv National University
- Medical Faculty of Sumy State University
- Medical Faculty of Uzhhorod University
- Medical Faculty of Dnipro National University
- Kyiv Medical University of UAFM

=== United Kingdom ===
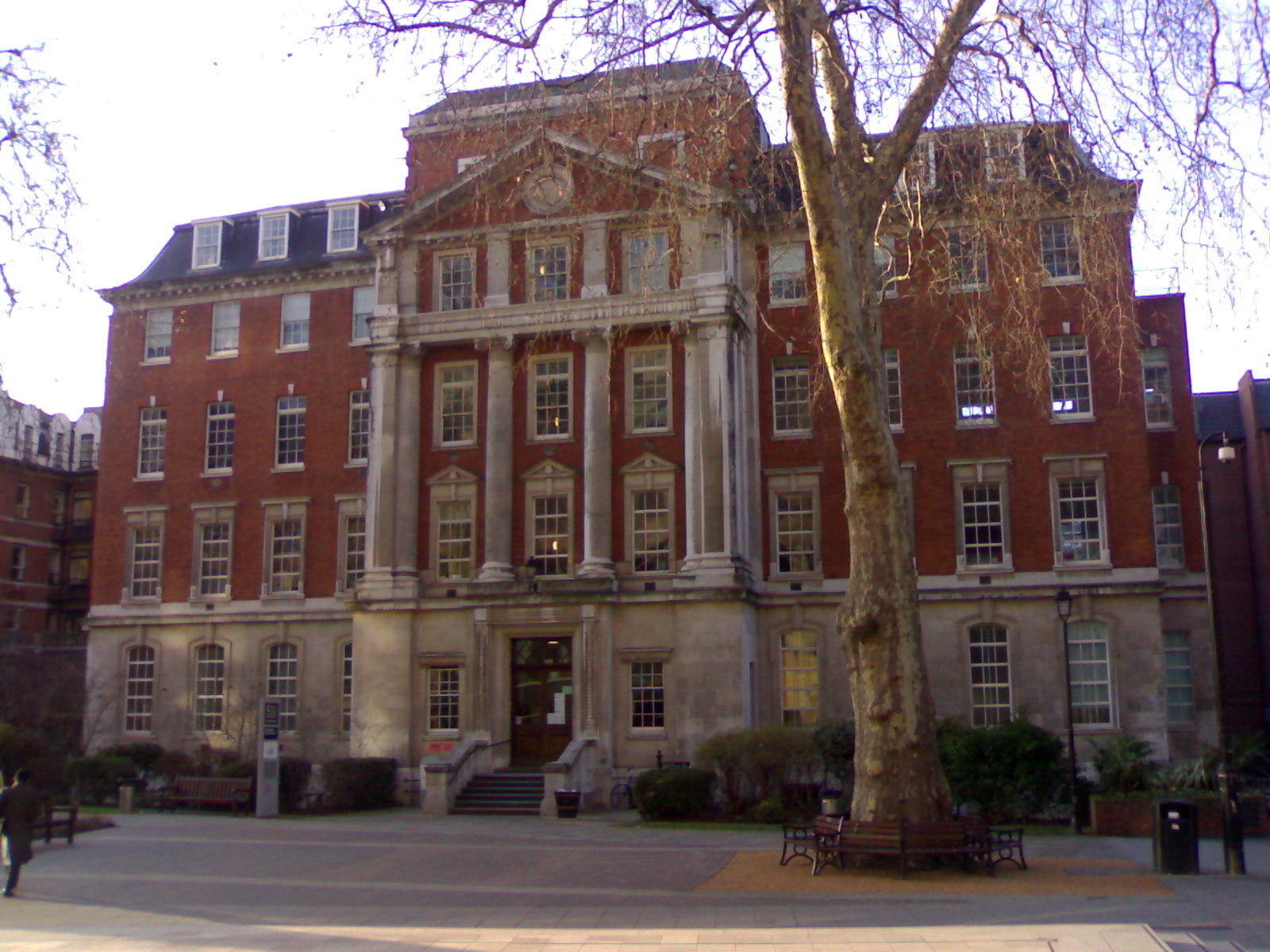
Shepherd's House at King's College London School of Medicine and Dentistry in London

In the United Kingdom, the code for higher education, first degrees in medicine comprise an integrated programme of study and professional practice spanning several levels. While the final outcomes of the qualifications themselves typically meet the Expectations of the descriptor for higher education qualification at level 7 (the UK master's degree). These degrees may retain, for historical reasons, "Bachelor of Medicine, Bachelor of Surgery" and are abbreviated to MBChB or MBBS.

There are currently 32 institutions that offer medical degrees in the United Kingdom. Completion of a medical degree in the UK results in the award of the degrees of Bachelor of Medicine and Bachelor of Surgery. Admission requirements to the schools varies; most insist on solid A-Levels/Highers, a good performance in an aptitude test such as the UKCAT, the BMAT or the GAMSAT, and usually an interview. As of 2008 the UK has approximately 8000 places for medical students.

Methods of education range from courses that offer a problem-based learning approach (alongside lectures etc.), and others having a more traditional pre-clinical/clinical structure. Others combine several approaches in an integrated approach.

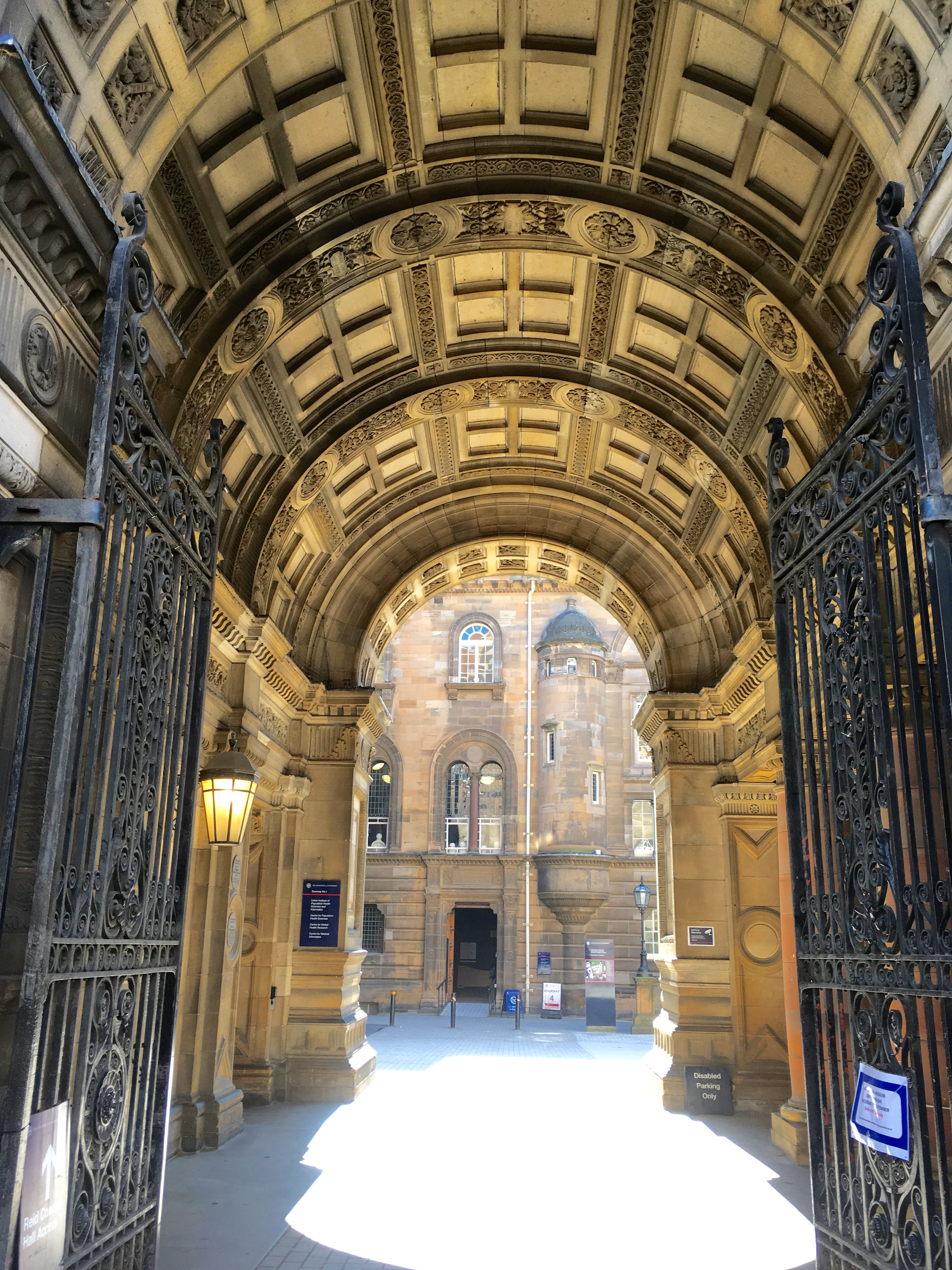
University of Edinburgh Medical School

Following qualification, UK doctors enter a generalised two-year, competency-based "foundation programme", gaining full GMC (General Medical Council) registration at the end of foundation year one, and applying for specialist training (in medicine, surgery, general practice etc.) after foundation year two.

Many medical schools offer intercalated degree programmes to allow students to focus on an area of research outside their medical degree for a year.

Some medical schools offer graduate entry programmes, which are four years long. The name refers to the fact that students on these courses already have a degree in another subject (i.e. they are graduates). Due to the shorter length of the course, the timetable of these degrees are more intense and the holidays are shorter, compared to students on the 5-year course. In terms of entrance requirements, the 4-year degree restricts entry to those who already hold a first degree, and have previously worked in an area of healthcare. The first degree does not necessarily have to be a BSc degree (this is the criteria for some of the medical schools), whereas other medical schools specify that the prior degree has to be in a science subject. Competition for this course is fierce, with students having to also sit an entrance exam prior to being considered for an interview.

Medical schools typically admit more students into undergraduate programmes than into graduate entry programmes.

== Latin America ==
=== Argentina ===
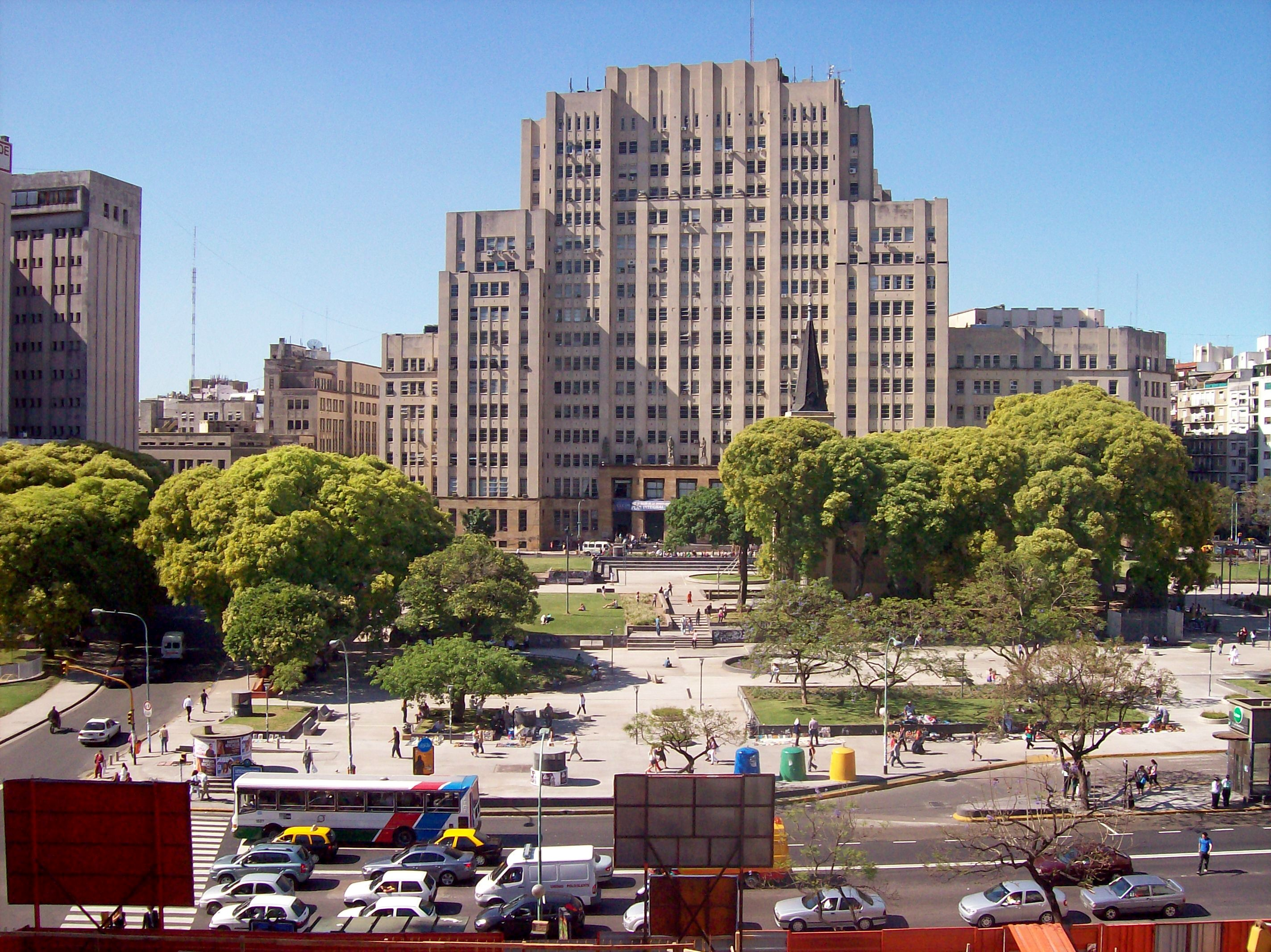
The Faculty of Medical Sciences at the University of Buenos Aires

In 1821, the first school of medicine was formed in the capital city Buenos Aires, where the bulk of the medical schools are located. As of 2006, there were 29 medical schools in Argentina. Medical degree programs in Argentina typically are six years long, with some universities opting for 7 year programs. The six years usually consist of 3 years of basic sciences, 2 years of clinical sciences, and one internship year (in Spanish "internado anual rotatorio"). The internship is completed in a Hospital associated with the university. In some provinces (especially round the more developed South) there are government-funded hospitals who pay for the internship. Some universities have cultural exchange programmes that allow a medical student in their final year to serve their community time overseas.

In Argentina, there are public and private medical schools. By law entrance into public institutions is open and tuition-free to all who have a high school diploma, and universities are expressly forbidden from restricting access with difficult entrance exams. Point in case, in 2016 the National University of La Plata was forced by governing bodies to stop forcing its students to write an entrance exam. As a result, that university experienced a major increase in the size of its student population. Another consequence is that schools have a high drop-out rate during the first years that approach 90%. When it comes to educational quality, the University of Buenos Aires Faculty of Medical Sciences, a public university, is widely recognised as the top medical school in the country.

Upon graduation, one of the following degrees is obtained, according to the university: Doctor of Medicine, or both Doctor of Medicine and Doctor of Surgery. Public universities usually confer both degrees, and private universities bestow only a Doctor of Medicine. In daily practice, however, there is no substantial difference between what a Doctor of Medicine or a Doctor of Medicine and Doctor of Surgery are allowed to do. When the degree is obtained, a record is created for that new doctor in the index of the National Ministry of Education (Ministerio Nacional de Educación), and the physician is given their corresponding medical practitioner's ID, which is a number that identifies him and his academic achievements. In addition, there is a provincial ID, i.e. a number to identify doctors in the province they practice medicine in. Completion of a residency program is not required for medical licensing.

There is no central system for applying for medical residency. Doctors wishing to pursue a specialty must take rigorous entrance exams at the public/private institution of their choice that offers them. Programs admit approximately half of each year's graduates after a lengthy selection process. Most specialty courses last four years, depending on the branch of medicine the physician has chosen.

=== El Salvador ===
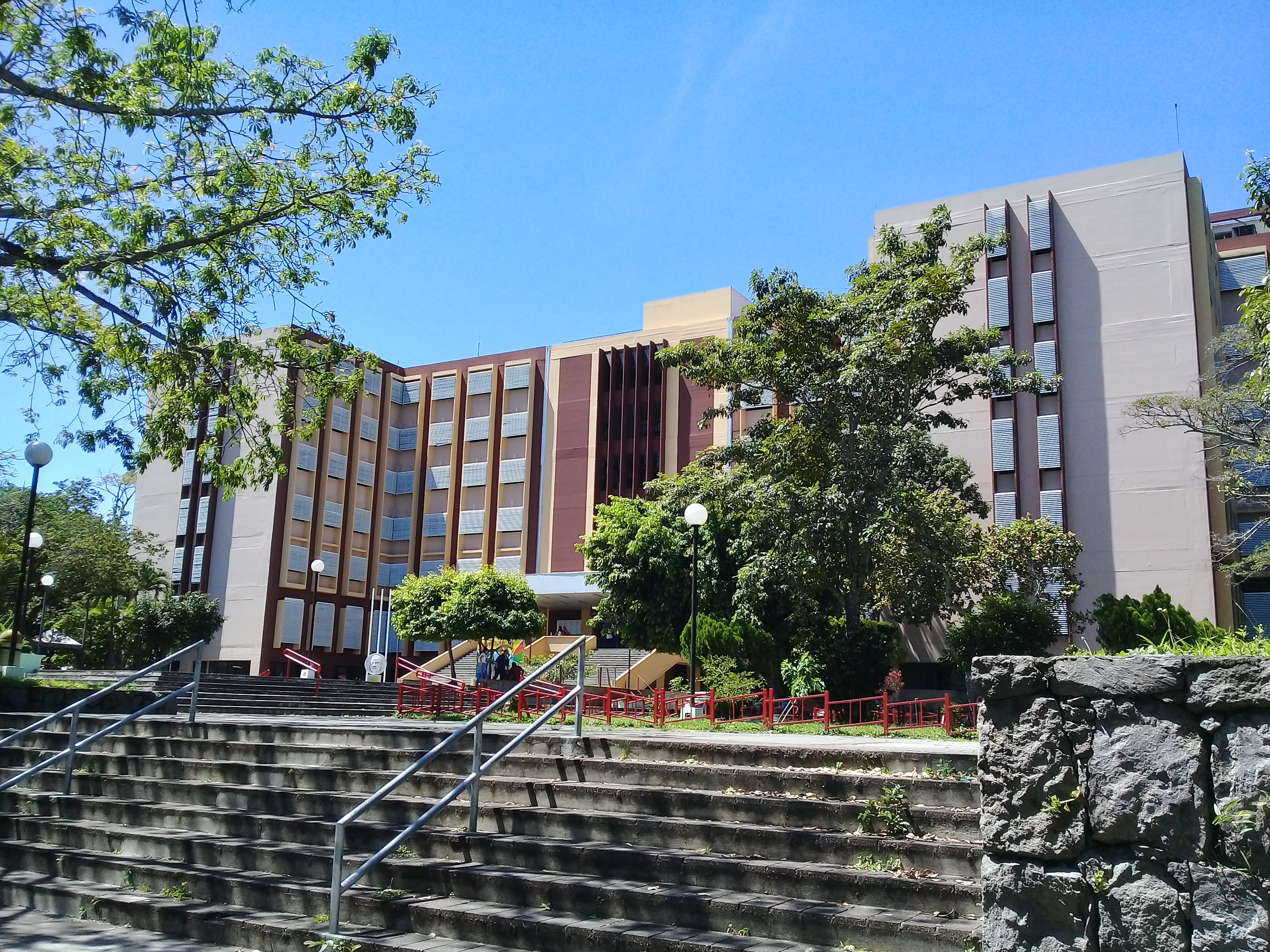
Main building at the School of Medicine of the University of El Salvador

The University of El Salvador) has a program lasting eight years for students who want to study medicine. The first six years are organized in a two semesters fashion, the seventh year is used for a rotating internship through the major specialty areas in a 10-week periods fashion (psychiatry and public health share a period) and the eighth year is designated for Social service in locations approved by the Ministry of Health (usually as attending physician in Community Health Centers or non-profit organizations). The graduates receive the degree of MD and must register in the Public Health Superior Council to get the medical license and a registered national number that allows them to prescribe barbiturates and other controlled drugs.

In order to attend further studies, including surgery, internal medicine, G/OB, pediatrics, or psychiatry, students in the year of social service or graduates of any Salvadorian university must apply independently for the residency at the hospital of choice; the preliminary selection process is based on the results of clinical knowledge tests, followed by psychiatric evaluations and interviews with the hospital medical and administrative staff. The basic residencies mentioned above commonly last 3 years; at the last trimester of the third year, the residents can apply to the position of Chief of residents (1 year) or follow further studies as residents (3 years) of a specialty (for example orthopedic surgery, urology, neurology, endocrinology...). No further studies are offered to date; therefore, specialists looking for training or practice in a specific area (For example, a neurosurgeon looking for a specialty in endovascular neurosurgery, spine surgery or pediatric neurosurgery) must attend studies in other countries and apply for such positions independently.

=== Bolivia ===
In Bolivia, all medical schools are Faculties within a university and follow the European model of a six-year curriculum (9 000 ECTS or more) divided into three cycles. The first two years are called the biomedical or pre-clinical cycle. During this time students are instructed in the basic sciences (anatomy, anthropology, biochemistry, biophysics, cell biology, embryology, histology, physiology, pharmacology, biostatistics, etc.). The next three years are the clinical cycle and consist of medical specialties instruction at the faculty and hospital practice. The last year consists of an internship for 3 months each of surgery, internal medicine, gynecology and pediatrics. To acquire the license from the government to practice medicine, at the end of the internship an Honorary Mandatory Socialist Service (SSSRO) must be done in a rural area of the country for at least three months.

After getting the degree and license as "Graduate of Medicine and Surgery" or Médico Cirujano (MC) may take a post-graduate residency from 3 to 6 years in order to acquire a specialty.

=== Brazil ===
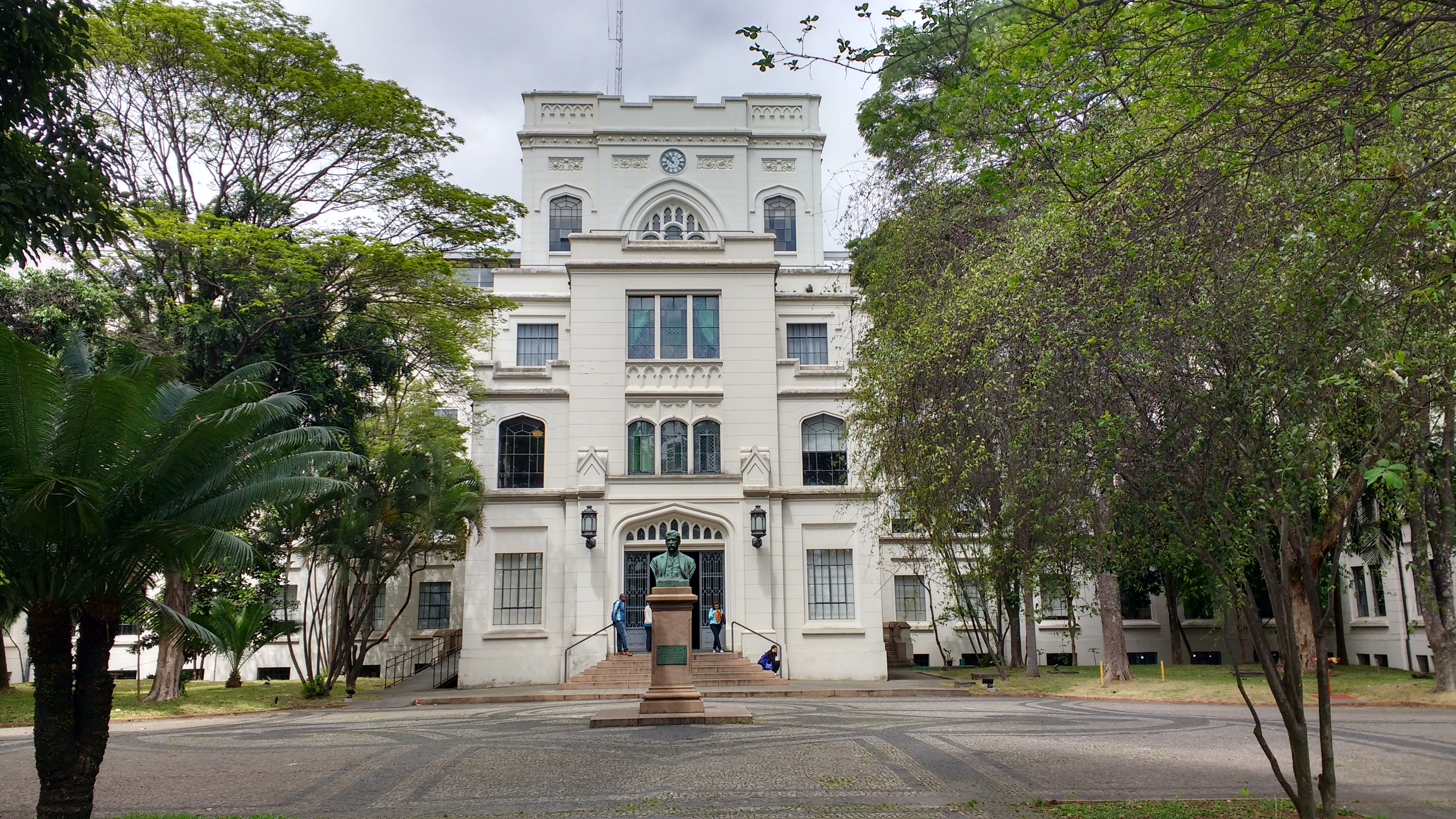
The Faculty of Medicine at the University of São Paulo

The Brazilian medical schools follow the European model of a six-year curriculum, divided into three cycles of two years each. The first two years are called basic cycle (ciclo básico). During this time students are instructed in the basic sciences (anatomy, physiology, pharmacology, immunology, etc.) with activities integrated with the medical specialties, allowing the student an overview of the practical application of such content. After its completion, the students advance to the clinical cycle (ciclo clinico). At this stage contact with patients intensify and work with tests and diagnostics, putting into practice what was learned in the first two years. The last two are called internships (internato). In this last step, the students focus on clinical practice, through training in teaching hospitals and clinics. The teaching of this last step reflects an axis of increasing complexity, enabling students to make decisions and participate effectively in form and operative care under the direct supervision of faculty and qualified to act as teaching aids physicians.

After six years of training, students graduate and are awarded the title of physician (Médico) allowing them to register with the Regional Council of Medicine (Conselho Regional de Medicina). The recent graduate will be able to exercise the medical profession as a general practitioner and may apply to undertake postgraduate training. In 2012, the Regional Council of Medicine of São Paulo (Conselho Regional de Medicina do Estado de São Paulo) established that physicians who graduate this year must pass a test to obtain professional registration. Passing the exam, however, is not linked to obtaining registration. It required only the presence of the candidate and the test performance. Already at the national level, there is a pending Senate bill creating the National Proficiency Examination in Medicine (Exame Nacional de Proficiência em Medicina), which would make the race a prerequisite for the exercise of the profession.

Physicians who want to join a specialization program must undergo a new selection examination considered as competitive as that required to join a medical school. The specialization programs are divided into two categories: direct access and prerequisite. The specialties with direct access are those in which the doctor can enroll without having any prior expertise. Any physician can apply to examinations for these specialties, regardless of the time of training or prior experience. To apply to proprietary pre-requisite, the doctor should have already completed a specialty prior. The programs may range from 2 to 6 years. Brazil currently recognizes by the Federal Council of Medicine, the Brazilian Medical Association and the National Commission of Medical Residency 53 residency programs. Fully complied with, gives the title of a resident physician specialist.

=== Chile ===
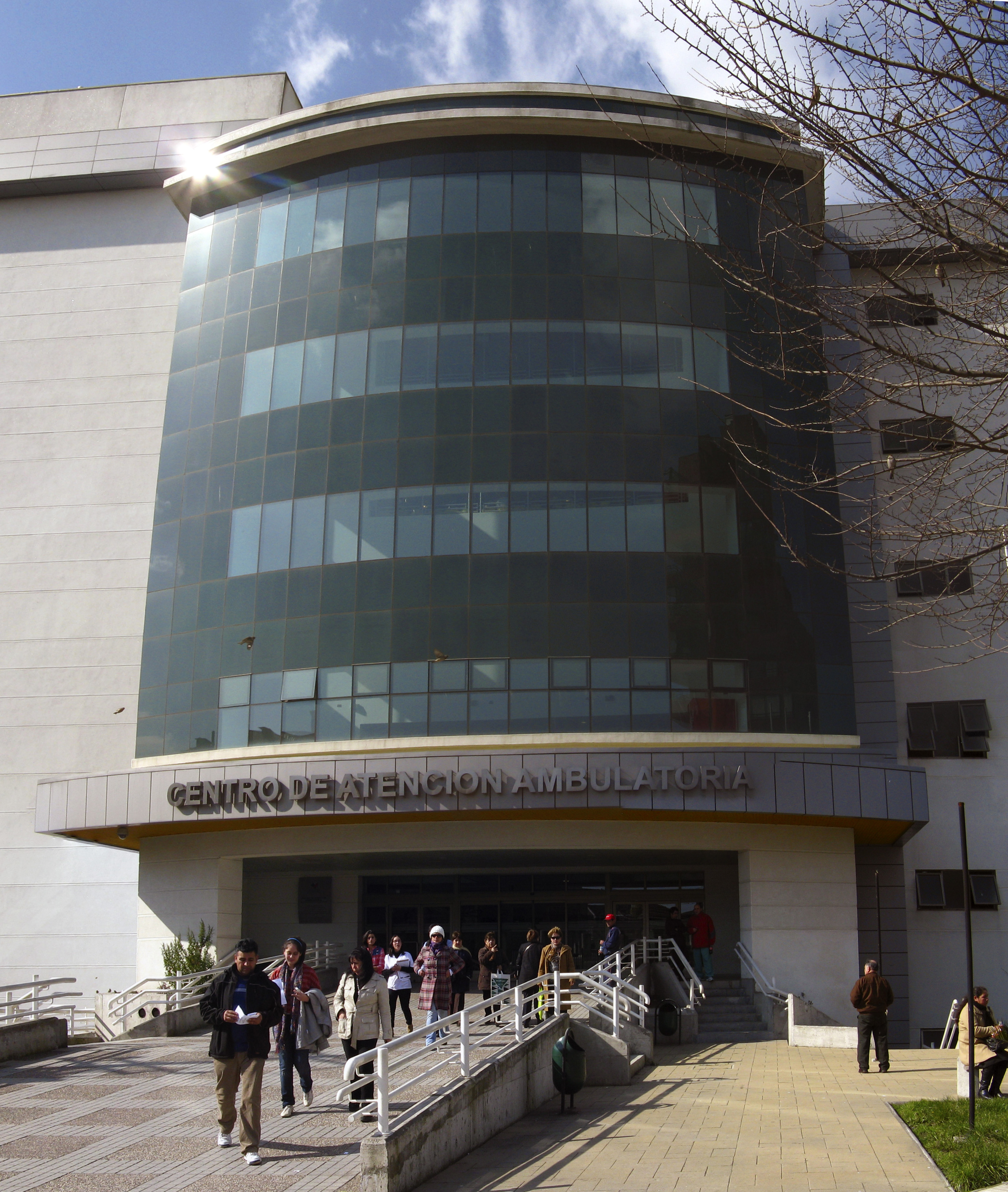
The Dr. Guillermo Grant Benavente Regional Clinical Hospital at the University of Concepción in Chile

In Chile, there are 21 medical schools. Principal medical schools are Universidad de Chile, Pontificia Universidad Católica de Chile, Universidad de Concepción, Universidad de Valparaíso and Universidad de Santiago de Chile. The pre-grade studies are distributed over 7 years, where the last 2 are the internship, which include at least surgery, internal medicine, gynecology and pediatrics. After getting the degree of Licenciate in Medicine (General Medicine) the MD must pass a medicine knowledge exam called the Unique National Exam of Medical Knowledge (EUNACOM "Examen Único Nacional de Conocimientos de Medicina" in Spanish) and can take a direct specialty or work before in primary attention in order to gain access to a residency.

=== Colombia ===
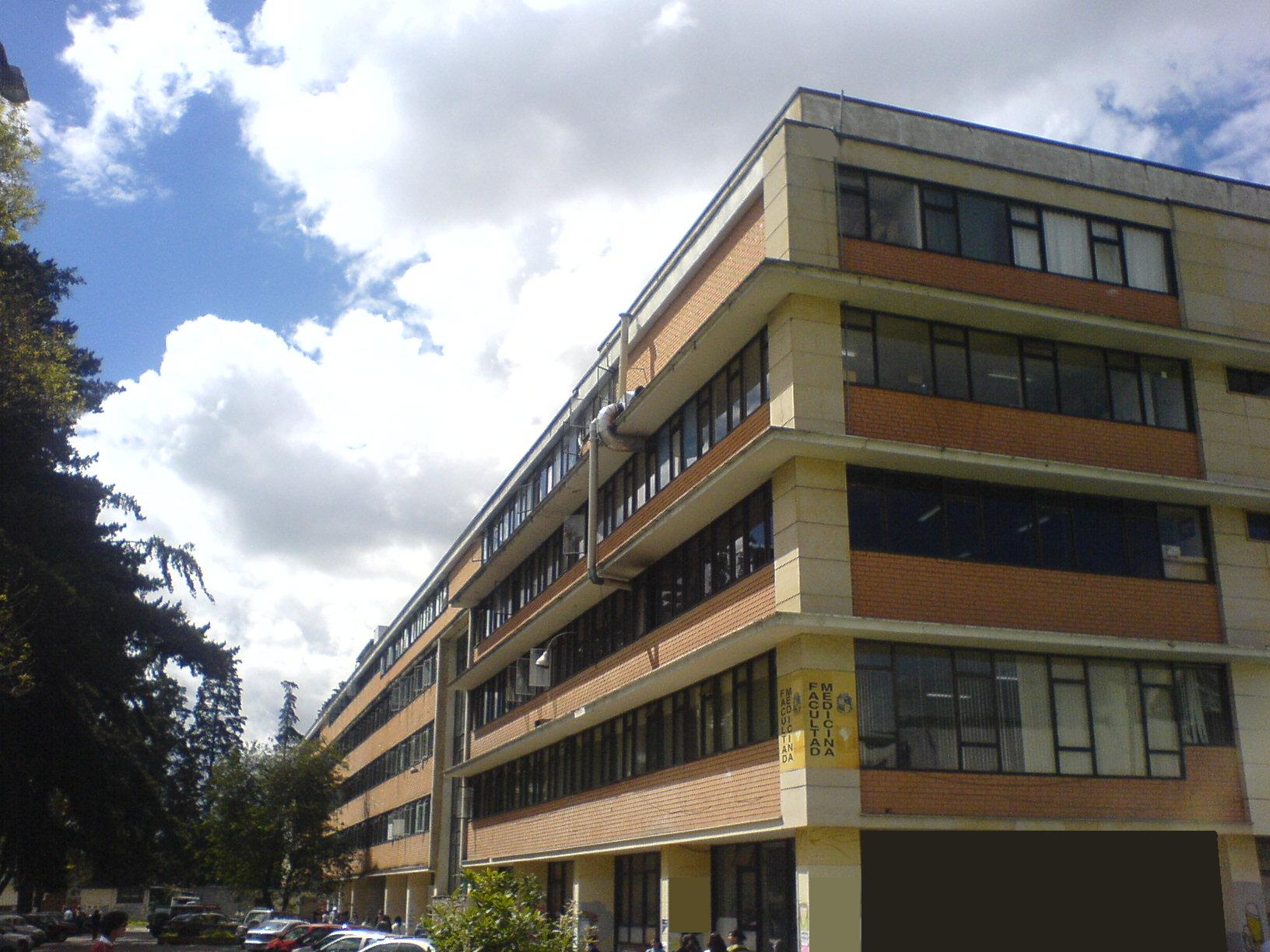
The College of Medicine at the National University of Colombia College in Bogotá

In Colombia, there are 50 medical schools listed in the World Directory of Medical Schools, 27 of which have active programs and are currently registered and accredited as high-quality programs by the Colombian Ministry of Education. The main medical programs are offered by the Universidad Nacional de Colombia, Pontificia Universidad Javeriana, Universidad del Rosario, Universidad El Bosque, Universidad de los Andes, Universidad del Valle, Universidad de Antioquia, Universidad de Santander, Universidad del Norte and Universidad de la Sabana. Most programs require 6–7 years of study, and all offer a Doctor of Medicine (MD) degree. In some cases, the school also allows for a second degree to be studied for at the same time (this is chosen by the student, though most students end up needing to do alternate semesters between their degrees, and mostly in careers like microbiology or biomedical engineering). For example, the Universidad de los Andes has a program whereby the medical student could graduate with both an MD and a Master of Business Administration (MBA) degree or an MD and a master's degree in public health. Admission to medical school varies with the school but is usually dependent on a combination of a general application to the university, an entrance exam, a personal statement or interview, and secondary (high) school performance mostly as reflected on the ICFES score (the grade received on the state exam in the final year of secondary/high school).

In most medical programs, the first two years deal with basic scientific courses (cellular and molecular biology, chemistry, organic chemistry, mathematics, and physics), and the core medical sciences (anatomy, embryology, histology, physiology, and biochemistry). The following year may change in how it is organized in different schools but is usually organ system-based pathophysiology and therapeutics (general and systems pathology, pharmacology, microbiology, parasitology, immunology, and medical genetics are also taught in this block). In the first two years, the programs also usually begin the courses in the epidemiology track (which may or may not include biostatistics), a clinical skills track (semiology and the clinical examination), a social medicine/public health track, and a medical ethics and communication skills track. Modes of training vary but are usually based on lectures, simulations, standardized-patient sessions, problem-based learning sessions, seminars, and observational clinical experiences. By year three, most schools have begun the non-elective, clinical-rotation block with accompanying academic courses (these include but are not limited to internal medicine, pediatrics, general surgery, anaesthesiology, orthopaedics, gynaecology and obstetrics, emergency medicine, neurology, psychiatry, oncology, urology, physical medicine and rehabilitation, ophthalmology, and otorhinolaryngology). Elective rotations are usually introduced in the fourth or fifth year, though as in the case of the non-elective rotations, the hospitals the medical students may be placed in or apply to for a given rotation depend entirely on the medical schools. This is important in terms of medical training, given the particular distinction of patients, pathologies, procedures, and skills seen and learned in private vs. public hospitals in Colombia. Most schools, however, have placements in both types of hospitals for many specialties.

The final year of medical school in Colombia is referred to as the internship year ("internado"). The internship year is usually divided into two semesters. The first semester is made up of obligatory rotations that every student does though in different orders, and the medical intern serves in 5–7 different specialties, typically including internal medicine, paediatrics, general surgery, anaesthesiology, orthopaedics, gynaecology and obstetrics, and emergency medicine. The extent of the responsibilities of the intern varies with the hospital, as does the level of supervision and teaching, but generally, medical interns in Colombia extensively take, write, and review clinical histories, answer and discuss referrals with their seniors, do daily progress notes for the patients under their charge, participate in the service rounds, present and discuss patients at rounds, serve shifts, assist in surgical procedures, and assist in general administrative tasks. Sometimes, they are charged with ordering diagnostic testing, but, under Colombian law, they cannot prescribe medication as they are not graduate physicians. This, of course, are to be completed in addition to their academic responsibilities. The second semester is made up of elective rotations, which can be at home or abroad, in the form of clerkships or observerships. A final graduation requirement is to sit a standardized exam, the State Exam for Quality in Higher Education ("Examen de Estado de Calidad de la Educación Superior" or ECAES, also known as SABER PRO) specific to medicine, which tests, for example, knowledge in public health and primary care.

After graduation, the physician is required to register with the Colombian Ministry of Health, in order to complete a year of obligatory social service ("servicio social obligatorio"), after which they qualify for a professional license to practice general medicine and apply for a medical residency within Colombia. If, however, the student wishes to practice general medicine abroad or continue onto their postgraduate studies, for example, they can independently begin the appropriate application/equivalency process, without doing their obligatory social service. In this case, they would not be licensed to practise medicine in Colombia and if they wish to do so, will have to register with the Ministry of Health. N.B. If the graduate physician gets accepted immediately into a residency within Colombia in internal medicine, paediatrics, family medicine, gynecology and obstetrics, general surgery or anaesthesiology, they are allowed to complete a 6-month-long social service after their residency.

In contrast with most countries, residencies in Colombia are not paid positions, since one applies for the program through the university offering the post, which requires a tuition. However, on 9 May 2017, legislation was formally introduced in Congress that would seek to regulate payment for medical residents, regulate their tuitions, and advocate for their vacation time and working hours. As in other countries, the length of residency training depends upon the specialty chosen, and, following its completion, the physician may choose to apply for a fellowship (subspecialty) at home or abroad depending on the availability of their desired training programs, or practice in their specialty.

=== Guyana ===
In Guyana, the medical school is accredited by the National Accreditation Council of Guyana. The medical program ranges from 4 years to 6 years. Students are taught the basic sciences aspect of the program within the first 2 years of medical school. In the clinical sciences program, students are introduced to the hospital setting where they gain hands-on training from the qualifying physicians and staff at the various teaching hospitals across Guyana.

- Texila American University
- American International School of Medicine
- University of Guyana

Students graduating from the University of Guyana are not required to sit for board exams before practicing medicine in Guyana. Students graduating from the American International School of Medicine sit the USMLE, PLAB or CAMC exams.

=== Panama ===
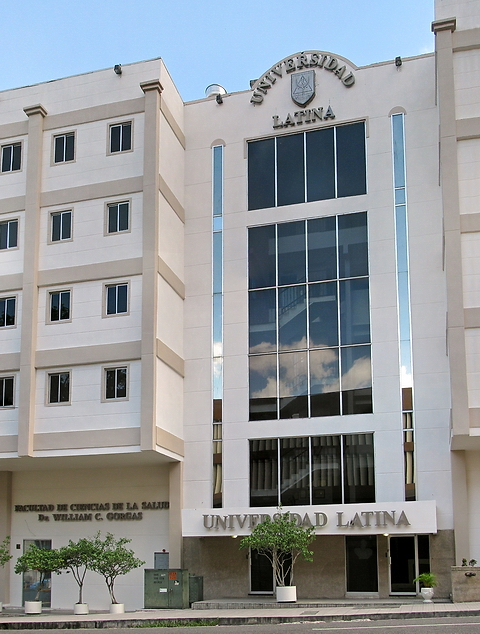
Facultad de Ciencias de la Salud, or the Faculty of Health Sciences, the medical school at the Latin University of Panama in Panama City

The system of Medical education in Panama usually takes students from high school directly into Medical School for a 6-year course, typically with a two-year internship.

In order to practice medicine in the Republic, or enter a residency program in Panama it is required to be a Panamanian citizen. Other requirements include:

- First year rotatory Internship: Qualified medical practitioners must successfully undertake and complete one year of supervised practice, generally known as an internship. The internship is undertaken in hospital positions accredited for this purpose.
- 2 year rural Internship: Upon successful conclusion of the first intern year, doctors are required to undertake and complete a second year of internship at an assigned government health institution. Once this requirement is fulfilled the medical practitioners qualify for full registration in the Medical Board and are licensed to engage in independent medical practice in Panama.

=== Uruguay ===
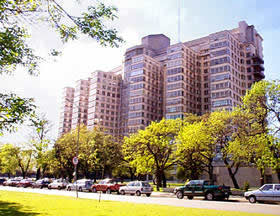
The Hospital Clinic Manuel Quintela at University of the Republic in Montevideo

In Uruguay, three universities offer a medical degree. The University of the Republic (UdelaR) is the oldest and largest institution in the country, with its Faculty of Medicine dating back to 1875. The program at this university has a duration of seven years. The faculty also operates the Dr. Manuel Quintela University Hospital as its teaching hospital.

The other two institutions offering medical studies are the Latin American Center for Human Economy (CLAEH) in Punta del Este, and the Catholic University of Uruguay, both of which offer a six-year program plus a mandatory internship.

=== Venezuela ===
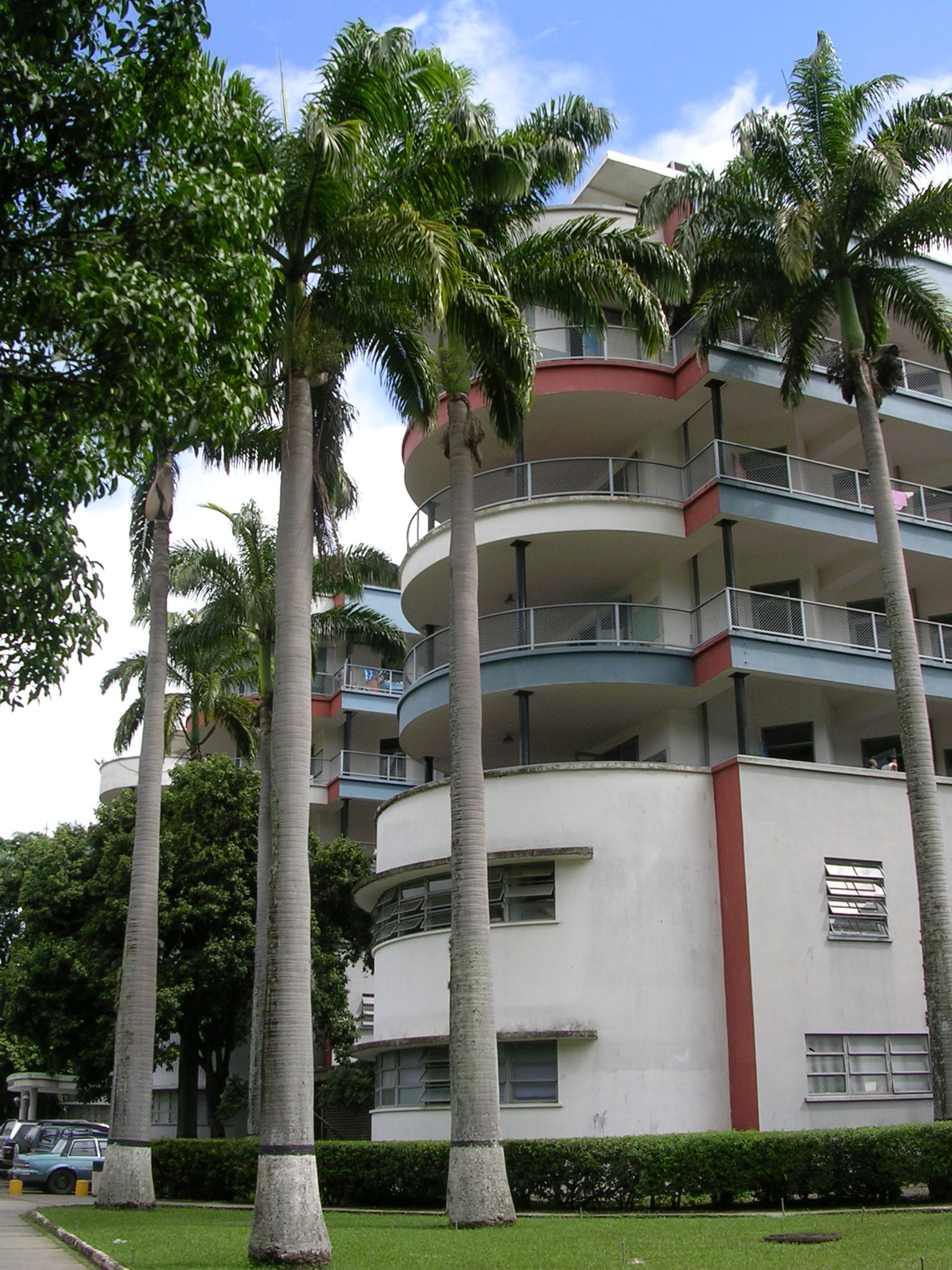
The Hospital Universitario de Caracas, part of the Central University of Venezuela in Caracas

These are the universities with a medical school in Venezuela:

- Central University of Venezuela
- University of the Andes (Venezuela)
- University of Zulia
- University of Carabobo
- Universidad de Oriente
- Universidad Centroccidental Lisandro Alvarado
- Universidad Nacional Experimental Francisco de Miranda
- Universidad Nacional Experimental de Los Llanos Centrales Rómulo Gallegos
- Bolivarian University of Venezuela

== Middle East ==
=== Egypt ===
Medical schools in Egypt are five-year programs. Education is conducted in English and leads to a Bachelor of Medicine and Surgery (MBBCh). Graduates must finish a two-year internship program at the end of their studies to obtain their general practitioner license. Clinical training happens in each school teaching hospital with few exceptions. A small number of schools use Ministry of Health hospitals.

Admission into Egyptian private and public medical schools is centrally managed by the government. After students submit their applications, they are distributed among different institutions according to both their order of preference and their high school performance.

In Egypt, there are two main pathways to postgraduate studies in medicine. The academic pathway, leading to a scientific degree: either MSc. or PhD The second is the Fellowship of the Egyptian Board (FEB) program. About 20% of medical graduates pursue post-graduate studies, the rest join the healthcare workforce as general practitioners.

=== Iran ===
General medicine education in Iran takes 7 to 7.5 years. Students enter the university after high school. Students study basic medical science (such as anatomy, physiology, biochemistry, histology, biophysics, embryology, etc.) for 2.5 years. At the end of this period they should pass a "basic science" exam. Those who passed the exam will move on to study physiopathology of different organs in the next 1.5 years. The organ-based learning approach emphasizes critical thinking and clinical application. In the next period of education students enter clinics and educational hospitals for two years. During this period, they will also learn practical skills such as history taking and physical examination. Students should then pass the "pre-internship" exam to enter the last 1.5 years of education in which medical students function as interns. During this period, medical students participate in all aspects of medical care of the patients and they take night calls. At the end of these 7.5 years students are awarded an MD degree. MD doctors can continue their educations through residency and fellowship.

=== Iraq ===
In Iraq, medical colleges (commonly referred to as medical schools in the US) typically offer a 6-year curriculum that is presented in the English language, similar to that of European countries. It is completely free for students with exceptionally high grades on 6th preparatory exams (standardized 12th grade exams), which are held by Iraq's Ministry of Education. There are paid options for students with lower grades. Medical education can commence immediately after the 6th preparatory class (equivalent to 12th grade in a K-12 system) in preparatory school (high school). As of 2024, there are 33 medical colleges in Iraq, both public (governorate/province-funded and/or government-funded) and private, acknowledged by the World Directory of Medical Schools.

Generally, the first year is introductory, with students studying basic human biology as well as non-medical subjects such as Human Rights, Arabic and English. These are foundational subjects. They are taught in every college in Iraq in the first or second year no matter the field, and they are deemed so by the Iraqi Ministry of Higher Education. The subsequent two years are pre-clinical and are similar to those of medical schools in other countries. The 4th and 5th years have clinical rotations and are clinical years. The 6th year is the last. During this year, students are primarily engaged in hospital rotations with less emphasis on academic material.

Throughout the 6 years, students may have to attend exams that more than one medical college participates in, although the specific timing and frequency of these exams vary between colleges. However, most colleges have a standardized exam at the end of year 6, which alone typically accounts for 30% of the cumulative grade. Upon completion of the program, graduates are awarded a Bachelor of Medicine, Bachelor of Surgery (M.B.Ch.B.) degree. The job title for those who hold the degree is "Rotating Resident Physician".

What follows is an exemplary curriculum from one of Iraq's medical colleges. This curriculum follows a "system-wise approach" where subjects are taught within the context of each system before transitioning to the next system.

- Year 1: (5% of cumulative grade)

The first semester includes Human and Cell Biology, Biochemistry, Medical Physics, Computer Science, English, and Human Rights; while the second semester includes Human and Cell Biology, Arabic, English, Medical Basics (Medical Ethics) and Immunology and Microbiology.

- Year 2: (5% of cumulative grade) includes Musculoskeletal System, Hematology, Cardiology and Pulmonology.
- Year 3: (5% of cumulative grade) includes Gastrointestinal Tract (GIT), Genitourinary Tract (GUT), Neurology and Endocrinology.
- Year 4: (20% of cumulative grade) includes Internal Medicine, Surgery, Pediatrics, Obstetrics and Gynecology, Community Medicine (Epidemiology) and Urology.
- Year 5: (25% of cumulative grade) includes Internal Medicine, Surgery, Forensic Medicine, Psychiatry, Ophthalmology, Dermatology and Otorhinolaryngology (ENT).
- Year 6: (40% of cumulative grade; 1% for a research project, 9% for courses exams, 30% for year 6 final exam) includes Family Medicine, Internal Medicine, Surgery, Pediatrics and Obstetrics and Gynecology.

The aforementioned year 6 exam tests the contents of not only the courses in year 6, but most courses in every year before it as well, with a major emphasis on clinical courses. After graduating, graduates have a grace period of 1 year before going into Rotating Residency. Graduates with the 10 (variable per year, according to the ministry) highest cumulative grades can voluntarily (and in some years, involuntarily, according to the ministry's orders) become teaching assistants where they teach medical students in the same college they graduated in. The cumulative grade also decides what a student can match into in Senior Residency. Residents can choose whether to apply for the Arab Board or the Iraqi Board, the latter being generally cheaper for Iraqi citizens.

Graduates of medical colleges must undergo additional training before being permitted to practice medicine independently.

- Rotating Residency lasts for one year and takes place in public hospitals within the resident's province/governorate. It typically involves rotations in internal medicine, general surgery, emergency medicine and obstetrics and gynecology. After this, a resident can begin Gradation.
- Gradation lasts for one year and usually requires the resident to serve in an underserved rural area within their province/governorate. Rotations are similar to that of Rotating Residency. After this, residents can specialize in a medical field of their choosing in Senior Residency.
- Senior Residency (equivalent to "internship" in the US) allows the resident to choose a specialty to be trained in privately for one year before going into Specialization. Specialties may be matched into based on the resident's cumulative grade in medical college. A cumulative grade of 85% is considered high and would permit the graduate to choose from most, if not all, medical specialties. Prior to 2022, the medical cumulative grade was assessed on a national scale. Starting in 2022, it has been evaluated at the provincial level, meaning students from lacking governorates no longer have to compete with students from other, better governorates. During senior residency, physicians are titled "Senior Resident Physician" in their respective medical specialty.
- Specialization (equivalent to "residency" in the US) is the period where a resident thoroughly studies and practices a specific specialty in medicine, with most specialties completing 4 years of training. All who complete specialization are titled "Specialized Physician" in their respective medical specialty and can practice medicine freely.

=== Israel ===
There are five university medical schools in Israel: the Rappaport Faculty of Medicine at the Technion in Haifa, the Joyce and Irving Goldman Medical School at Ben Gurion University in Be'er Sheva, the Faculty of Medicine at Tel Aviv University, the Hadassah School of Medicine at the Hebrew University in Jerusalem and the Azrieli Faculty of Medicine at Bar-Ilan University in Ramat Gan. These all follow the European 6-year model except Bar-Ilan University which has a four-year program similar to the US system.

The Technion Medical School, Ben Gurion University, and Tel Aviv University Faculty of Medicine offer 4-year MD programs for American Bachelor's graduates who have taken the MCAT, interested in completing rigorous medical education in Israel before returning to the US or Canada.

The entrance requirements of the various schools of medicine are very strict. Israeli students require a high school Baccalaureate average above 100 and psychometric examination grade over 700.

The degree of Doctor of Medicine (MD) is legally considered to be equivalent to a master's degree within the Israeli Educational System.

All medical school graduates must then pass a medical licensing exam and successfully complete a one-year internship. There are two kinds of internships:

- An internship is done in internal medicine, pediatrics or surgery. Interns spend two months in surgery, two months in pediatrics, one month in emergency medicine, and six consecutive months (the second half of the year) in a chosen specialty.
- Rotating internship offers a schedule that rotates through all major specialties—including three months of internal medicine (1 month may be substituted for geriatrics), two months of pediatrics (1 month may be substituted for a pediatric subspecialty), two months of surgery (1 month may be substituted for a surgical subspecialty), one month of emergency medicine, one month of anesthesiology and intensive care, and two elective months.

=== Jordan ===
The Doctor in Medicine (MD) degree is awarded in Jordan after completion of six years comprising three years of medical sciences and three clinical years. Currently, six state supported universities include a medical school and grant the degree, which are:

- University of Jordan in Amman
- Jordan University of Science and Technology in Irbid
- Mutah University in Al Karak
- Hashemite University in Zarqa
- Yarmouk University in Irbid
- Al-Balqaʼ Applied University in Salt

Jordan's undergraduate medical education started in the 1970s with the establishment of the first medical school in the University of Jordan. Their medical education system is well regarded in the region, thus attracting foreign students especially from around the Middle East (more than a third of all students). The sole admission criterion is a satisfactory mark in the high school national exam. Students with the highest mark gain admission through the general competition system (≈6% of applicants and ≈50% of all admissions). They are rewarded with partially subsidized inexpensive tuition fees. The rest of the admitted students are either foreigners or students that achieved high school marks of 85% or greater. The curricula is divided into an initial 3-year pre-clinical stage followed by 3 clinical years for a total of 6 years of education. The pre-clinical curriculum includes basic sciences, medical sciences and university required courses. In turn, the clinical curriculum includes clerkship rotations lasting from 2 to 12 weeks. At the end of the sixth year, students undergo a written theoretical assessment as well as a supervised clinical assessment. Passing students are awarded a Bachelor's in Medicine and Surgery

=== Lebanon ===
In Lebanon, there are two programs of medical education followed: the American system (4 years) and the European system (6 years). Programs are offered in English and French. Admission requirements to the American system requires a candidate to complete a bachelor's degree along with specific pre-medical courses during the undergraduate years, and writing the MCAT examination. European programs usually requires a candidate to complete 1 year of general science followed by a selection exam by the end of the year.

Schools following the American system (MD degree) are:

- American University of Beirut: located in Beirut and is the oldest medical school in Lebanon (established 1867). Training takes place at the American University of Beirut Medical center (AUBMC) in Beirut. It graduates ≈85 physicians per year.
- Lebanese American University (LAU Gilbert and Rose-Marie Chagoury School of Medicine): This program started in 2009. LAU Medical school is located in Byblos and has a 10-year affiliation with Partners Harvard Medical International. Training takes place at the University Medical center - Rizk Hospital (UMC-RH) located in Beirut. It is also affiliated with Clemenceau Medical Center and Rafik Hariri University Hospital. It graduates ≈50 physicians per year.
- University of Balamand: This program started in 2001. It is located in Koura, north Lebanon. Training takes place at the Saint George University Medical center in Beirut. It graduates ≈70 physicians per year.

The language of instruction in all three is English.

Schools following the European system (MBBS degree) are:

- Lebanese University: languages of instruction are French and English. Training takes place at the Rafik Hariri University Hospital located in Beirut. It is a 7-year program and graduates ≈120 physicians per year.
- Saint Joseph University: language of instruction is French. Training takes place in Hôtel-Dieu de France hospital located in Beirut. It is a 7-year program established in 1883.
- Beirut Arab University: language of instruction is English. Training takes place at Hammoud Hospital UMC located in Sidon and Rafik Hariri University Hospital located in Beirut. It is a 6-year program.
- Holy Spirit University of Kaslik: Located in Jounieh, languages of instruction are French and English. Training takes place at the Centre Hospitalier Universitaire Notre Dame des Secours located in Byblos. It is a newer school established in 2002 and has a 7-year program

=== Saudi Arabia ===
In Saudi Arabia medical education is free for all Saudi citizens. A medical student must pass an entrance examination and complete a 1-year pre-medical course containing some basic medical subjects including: Biology, Organic Chemistry, Inorganic Chemistry, Physics, Medical Biostatistics, and English for medical uses. Passing this year is commonly considered as the most challenging. It offers an MBBS (Bachelor of Medicine, Bachelor of Surgery) degree. after one pre-medical course, five medical years and one training year. By 2010, there are 24 medical schools in KSA- 21 nonprofit and three private medical schools. The last college opened was Sulaiman AlRajhi Colleges with its partnership with Maastricht in the Netherlands.

=== Syria ===
Medical education in Syria consists of 6 years of training after high school. The first three include the basic sciences subjects, followed by 2 years of clinical clerkships. The sixth year also include clerkships in main specialties. Then, medical students are required to pass a standardized medical exam for graduation. Placement into residency programs is based on their scores in the exit exam in addition to their medical school cumulative grades in the context of their desires.

=== Tunisia ===
In Tunisia, education is free for all Tunisian citizens and for foreigners who have scholarships. The oldest Medical school is the Medicine School of Tunis. There are four medicine faculties situated in the major cities of Tunis, Sfax, Sousse and Monastir. Admission is bound to the success and score in the Tunisian Baccalaureate examination. Admission score threshold is very high, based on competition among all applicants throughout the nation. Medical school curriculum consists of seven years; five years as an 'extern' and two years of internship or 'intern trainee' :

- Two years are medical theory, containing all basic sciences related to medicine. The curriculum is more focused on theoretical than on practical learning.
- Three years during which the student receives both theoretical and practical training with total immersion in the hospital environment, it consists of clinical issues related to all medical specialties. During these three years, the student has to attend at the university hospital every day, rotating around all wards. Every period is followed by a clinical exam regarding the student's knowledge in that particular specialty.
- Two years on internship, in which the student is a physician but under the supervision of the chief doctor; the student rotates over the major and most essential specialties during period of four months each. After that, student has the choice of either passing the residency national exam or extending his internship for another year, after which he gains the status of family physician. The residency program consists of four to five years in the specialty he qualifies, depending on his score in the national residency examination under the rule of highest score chooses first. Whether the student chooses to be a family doctor or a specialist, he has to make a doctorate thesis, which he will be defending in front of a jury, after which he gains his degree of Doctor of Medicine (MD).

In contrast, studies in dental medicine (general practitioner) and pharmaceutical studies last only 6 years. Courses throughout the university curriculum in both medicine and pharmacy are taught in French.

There are four universities of general medicine: the Faculty of Medicine of Tunis, the Faculty of Medicine Ibn El Jazzar of Sousse, the Faculty of Medicine of Monastir and the Faculty of Medicine of Sfax.

On the other hand, there is only one university of dentistry and pharmacy in Monastir: the faculty of dentistry of Monastir and the faculty of pharmacy of Monastir.

== North America ==
=== Canada ===
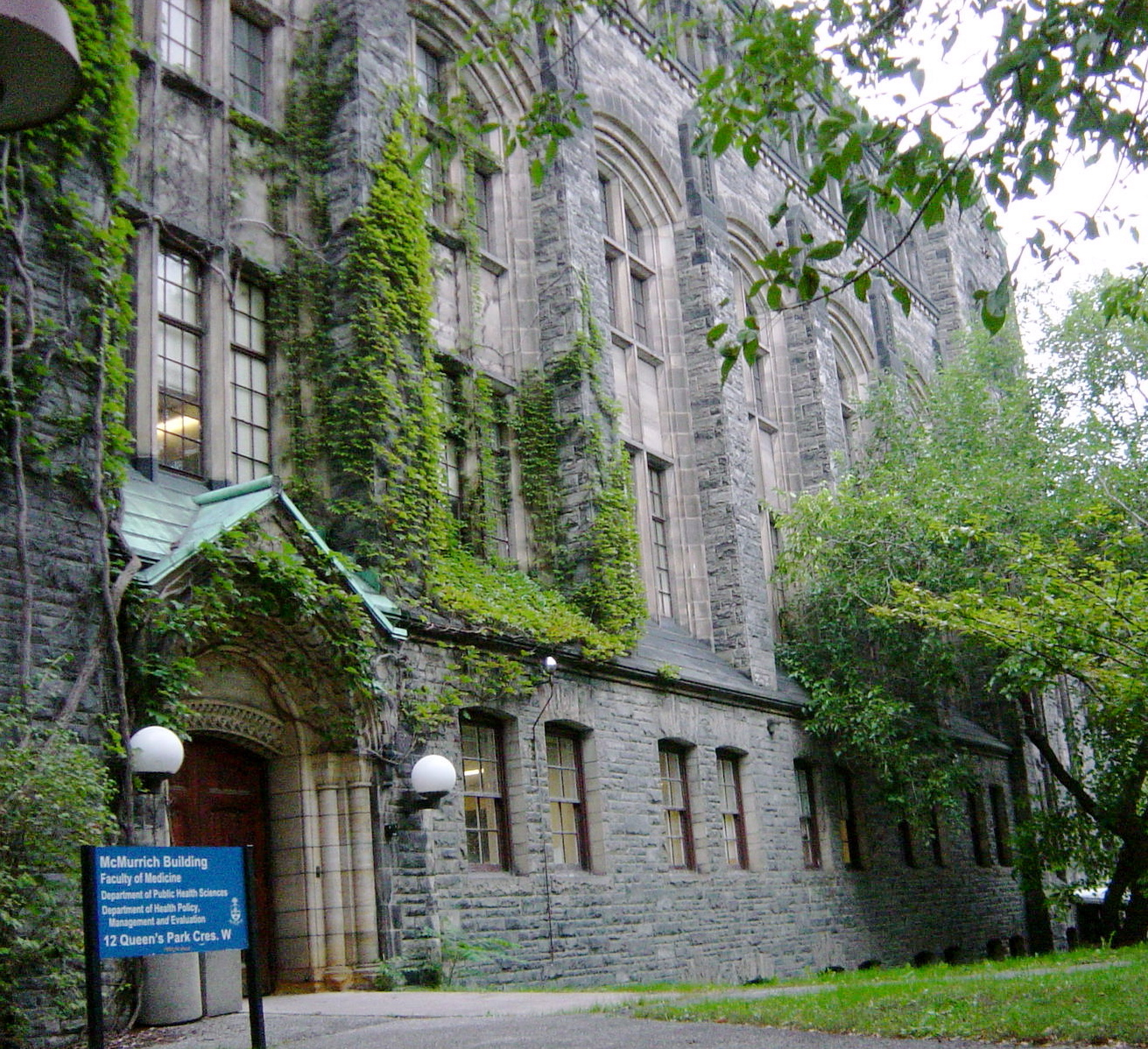
The Toronto Faculty of Medicine

As of 2013, the Association of American Medical Colleges lists 17 accredited MD-granting medical schools in Canada.

In Canada, a medical school is a faculty or school of a university that offers a three- or four-year Doctor of Medicine (MD) degree. Generally, medical students begin their studies after receiving a bachelor's degree in another field, often one of the biological sciences. However, admittance can still be granted during the third and fourth year. Minimum requirements for admission vary by region from two to four years of post-secondary study. The Association of Faculties of Medicine of Canada publishes a detailed guide to admission requirements of Canadian faculties of medicine on a yearly basis.

Admission offers are made by individual medical schools, generally on the basis of a personal statement, undergraduate record (GPA), scores on the Medical College Admission Test (MCAT), and interviews. Volunteer work is often an important criterion considered by admission committees. All four medical schools in Quebec and two Ontario schools (the University of Ottawa, Northern Ontario School of Medicine) do not require the MCAT. McMaster requires that the MCAT be written, though they only look for particular scores (6 or better) on the verbal reasoning portion of the test.

The first half of the medical curriculum is dedicated mostly to teaching the basic sciences relevant to medicine. Teaching methods can include traditional lectures, problem-based learning, laboratory sessions, simulated patient sessions, and limited clinical experiences. The remainder of medical school is spent in clerkship. Clinical clerks participate in the day-to-day management of patients. They are supervised and taught during this clinical experience by residents and fully licensed staff physicians.

Students enter into the Canadian Resident Matching Service, commonly abbreviated as CaRMS in the fall of their final year. Students rank their preferences of hospitals and specialties. A computerized matching system determines placement for residency positions. 'Match Day' usually occurs in March, a few months before graduation. The length of post-graduate training varies with choice of specialty.

During the final year of medical school, students complete part 1 of the Medical Council of Canada Qualifying Examination (MCCQE). Upon completion of the final year of medical school, students are awarded the degree of MD Students then begin training in the residency program designated to them by CaRMS. Part 2 of the MCCQE, an Objective Structured Clinical Examination, is taken following the completion of twelve months of residency training. After both parts of the MCCQE are successfully completed, the resident becomes a Licentiate of the Medical Council of Canada. In order to practice independently, however, the resident must complete the residency program and take a board examination pertinent to his or her intended scope of practice. In the final year of residency training, residents take an exam administered by either the College of Family Physicians of Canada or the Royal College of Physicians and Surgeons of Canada, depending on whether they are seeking certification in family medicine or another specialty.

=== United States ===
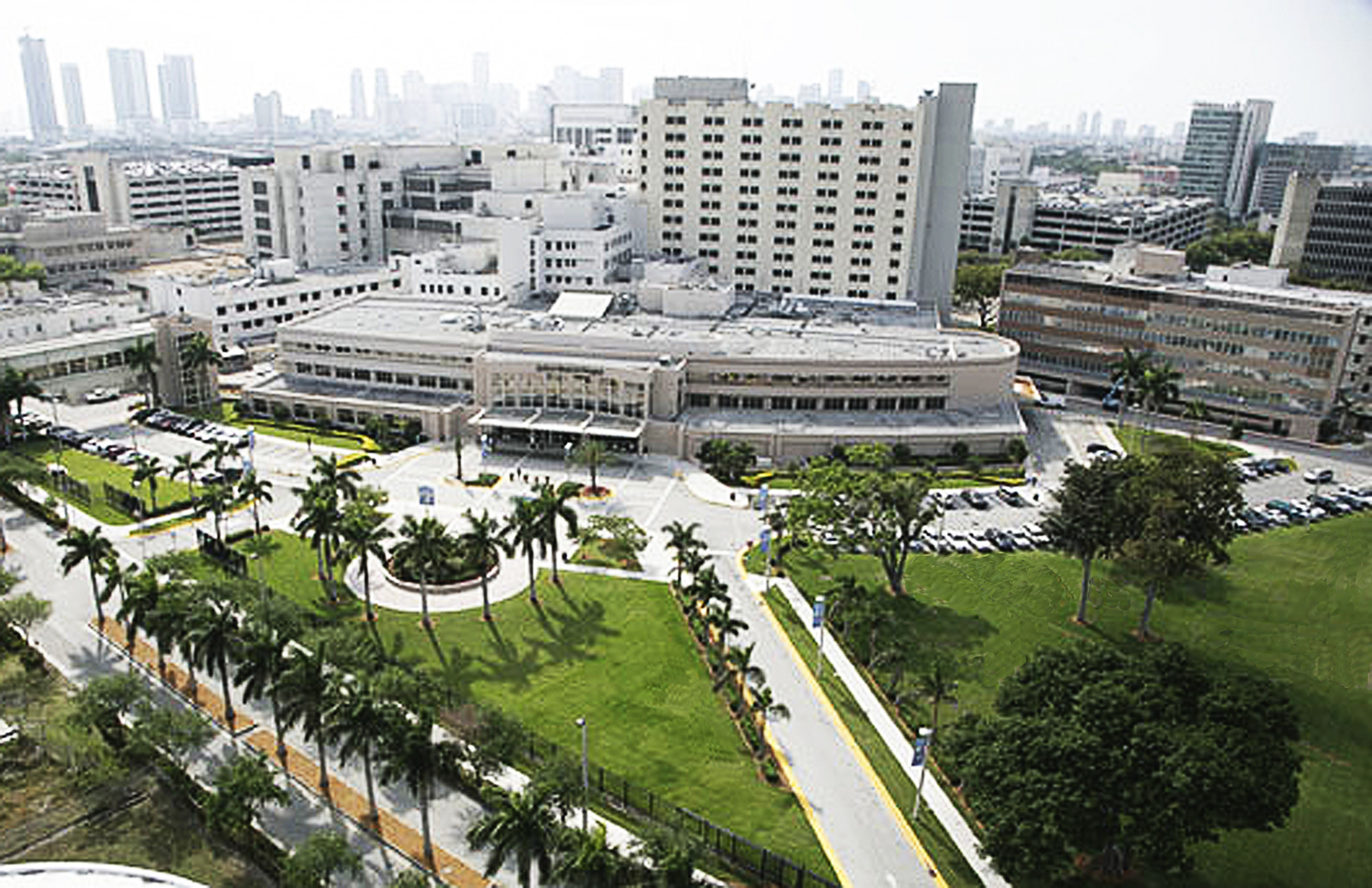
Jackson Memorial Hospital in Miami, the primary teaching hospital of the University of Miami's Miller School of Medicine and the largest hospital in the United States, with 1,547 beds

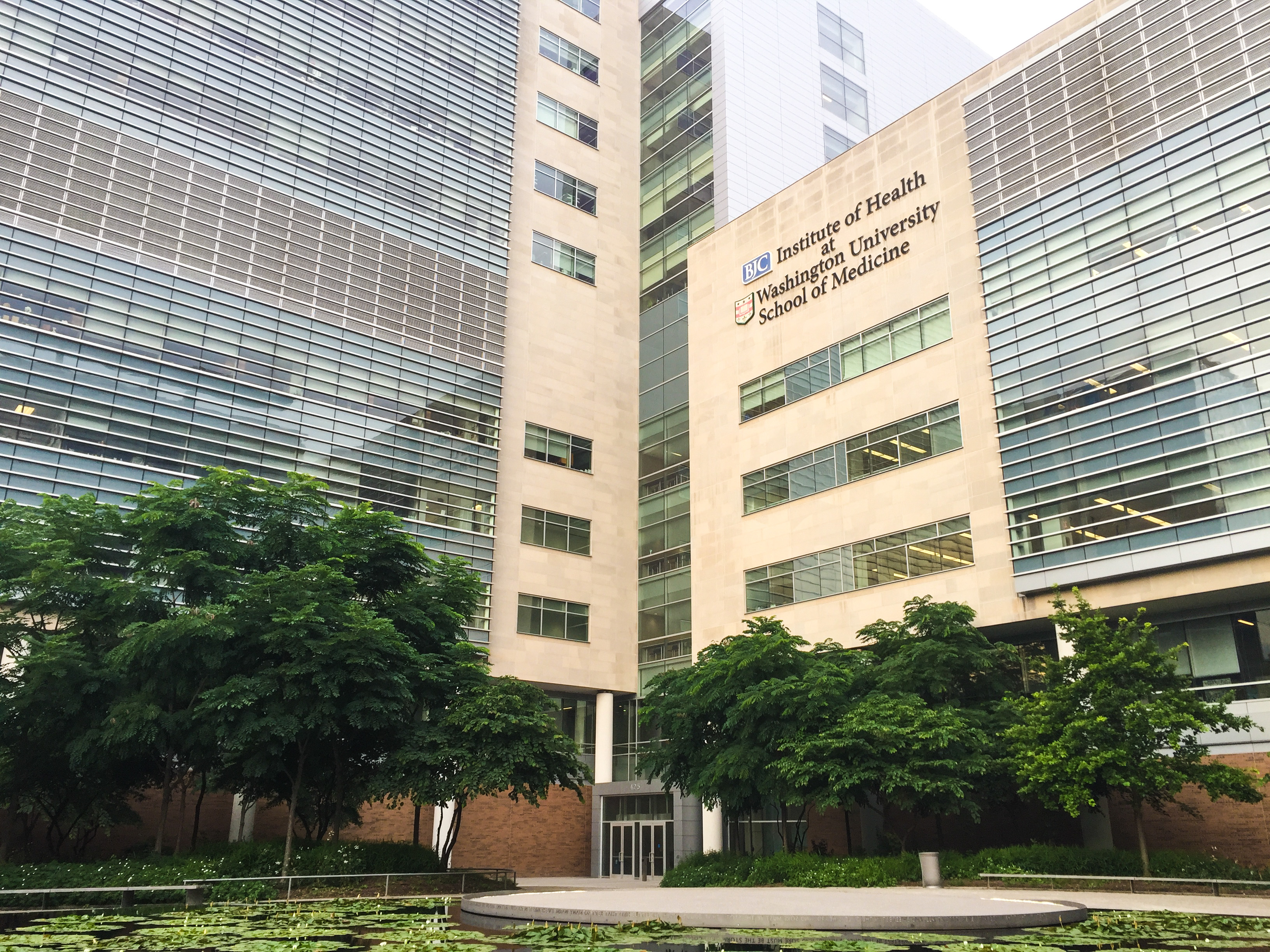
Washington University Medical School

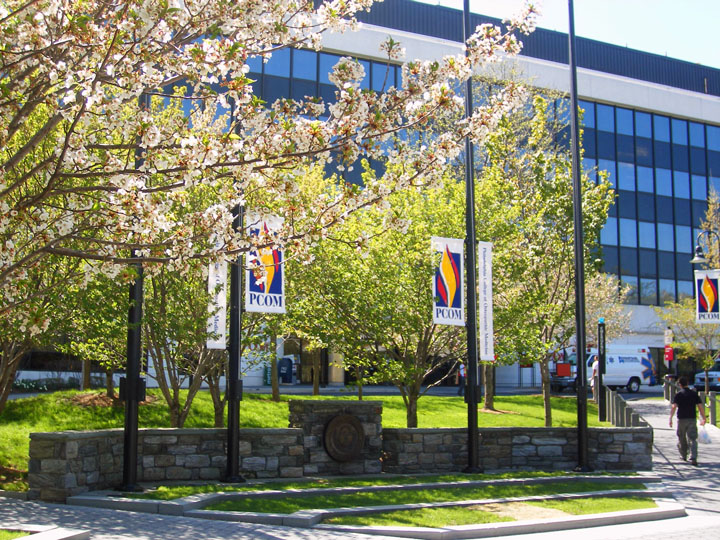
The Philadelphia College of Osteopathic Medicine in Philadelphia

In 2019, the Association of American Medical Colleges and American Association of Colleges of Osteopathic Medicine listed 154 accredited MD-granting and 36 accredited DO-granting medical schools in the United States.

There are two doctorate-level degrees conferred onto physicians in training in the United States, Doctor of Medicine (MD) and Doctor of Osteopathic Medicine (DO). Both entitle the awardee to train for and receive medical licensing through an accredited residency training program.

Admission to medical school in the United States is based mainly on a GPA, MCAT score, admissions essay, interview, clinical work experience, and volunteering activities, along with research and leadership roles in an applicant's history. While obtaining an undergraduate degree is not an explicit requirement for a few medical schools, virtually all admitted students have earned at least a bachelor's degree. A few medical schools offer pre-admittance to students directly from high school by linking a joint 3-year accelerated undergraduate degree and a standard 4-year medical degree with certain undergraduate universities, sometimes referred to as a "7-year program", where the student receives a bachelor's degree after their first year in medical school.Most medical schools begin upon the completion of a 4 year (Bachelor’s) and 6 year (Masters) degree in the specified medicinal field.

Typically, undergraduates students are expected to complete a series of prerequisites, consisting of biology, physics, and chemistry (general chemistry and organic chemistry). Many medical schools have additional requirements including calculus, genetics, statistics, biochemistry, English, and/or humanities classes. In addition to meeting the pre-medical requirements, medical school applicants must take and report their scores on the Medical College Admission Test (MCAT), a standardized test that measures a student's knowledge of the sciences and the English language.

In the 19th century, there were over 400 medical schools in the United States. By 1910, the number was reduced to 148 medical schools and by 1930 the number totaled only 76. Many early medical schools were criticized for not sufficiently preparing their students for medical professions, leading to the creation of the American Medical Association in 1847 for the purpose of self-regulation of the profession. Abraham Flexner (who in 1910 released the Flexner report with the Carnegie Foundation), the Rockefeller Foundation, and the AMA are credited with laying the groundwork for what is now known as the modern medical curriculum.

The standard U.S. medical school curriculum is four years long. Traditionally, the first two years are composed mainly of classroom basic science education, while the final two years primarily include rotations in clinical settings where students learn patient care firsthand. Today, clinical education is spread across all four years with the final year containing the most clinical rotation time. The Centers for Medicare and Medicaid Services (CMS) of the U.S. Department of Health and Human Services (HHS) has published mandatory rules, obliging all inpatient and outpatient teaching settings, laying down the guidelines for what medical students in the United States may do, if they have not completed a clerkship or sub-internship. These rules apply when they are in the clinical setting in school, not when they are, for example, helping staff events or in other non-formal educational settings, even if they are helping provide certain clinical services along with nurses and the supervising physicians- for example, certain basic screening procedures.

Upon successful completion of medical school, students are granted the title of Doctor of Medicine (MD) or Doctor of Osteopathic Medicine (DO).

Each year, thousands of recent graduates and seniors from American medical schools, as well as foreign trained physicians participate in the National Resident Matching Program (NRMP) to secure clinical training positions in U.S. teaching hospitals. In 2025, a total of 47,208 active applicants competed for 40,041 PGY-1 positions and 3,196 second-year (including physician (R)) residency positions. 8,392 U.S. DO seniors have submitted a rank order list. 4,587 U.S. IMGs and 11,465 non-U.S. citizen IMGs submitted rank order lists. U.S. MD schools historically have a very high match rate while DO schools and foreign schools have lower match rates and less competitive specialties.

In 2020, more than half of all medical schools had a four-year attendance cost exceeding $275,000, with 19 schools surpassing $350,000. This substantial financial burden impacts medical students as they pursue their education and training.

== Medical students ==
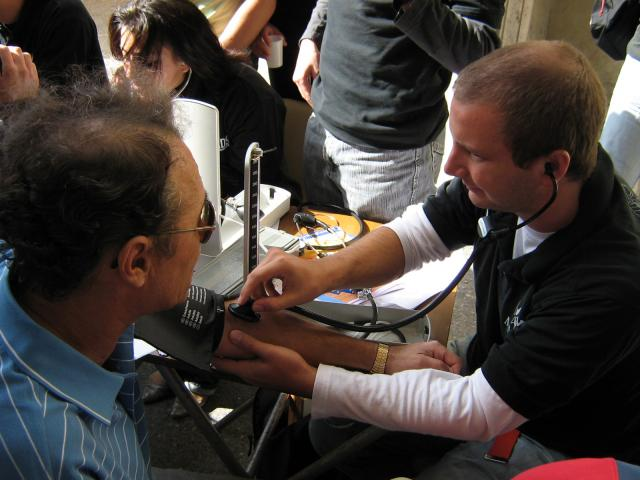
A medical student checking blood pressure on an awareness drive

A person accepted into a medical school and enrolled in an educational program in medicine, with the goal of becoming a medical doctor, is referred to as a medical student.

=== Abuse in medical school ===
Medical students face verbal abuse, humiliation, and harassment in clinical settings, impacting their mental health and learning. Depressive symptoms affect 24–29% of medical students and 25–33% of resident physicians. Approximately 14% of students experience moderate to severe depression, with 5% having suicidal thoughts during training. German and South Korean medical students have even higher depression rates. Seeking treatment is challenging due to faculty judgment and lack of social support. The COVID-19 pandemic worsened mental health issues among medical students.

== See also ==
- American Medical College Application Service (AMCAS)
- Bimaristan
- Flexner Report
- Graduate Australian Medical Schools Admissions Test (GAMSAT) [UK, Australia, Ireland]
- International medical graduate
- List of medical schools
- List of university hospitals
- Medical College Admission Test (MCAT) [United States, Canada]
- Undergraduate Medicine and Health Sciences Admission Test (UMAT) [Australia]
- University Clinical Aptitude Test (UCAT) [UK, Australia, New Zealand]
