= Anglo Singapore International School =

- โรงเรียนนานาชาติแองโกลสิงคโปร์
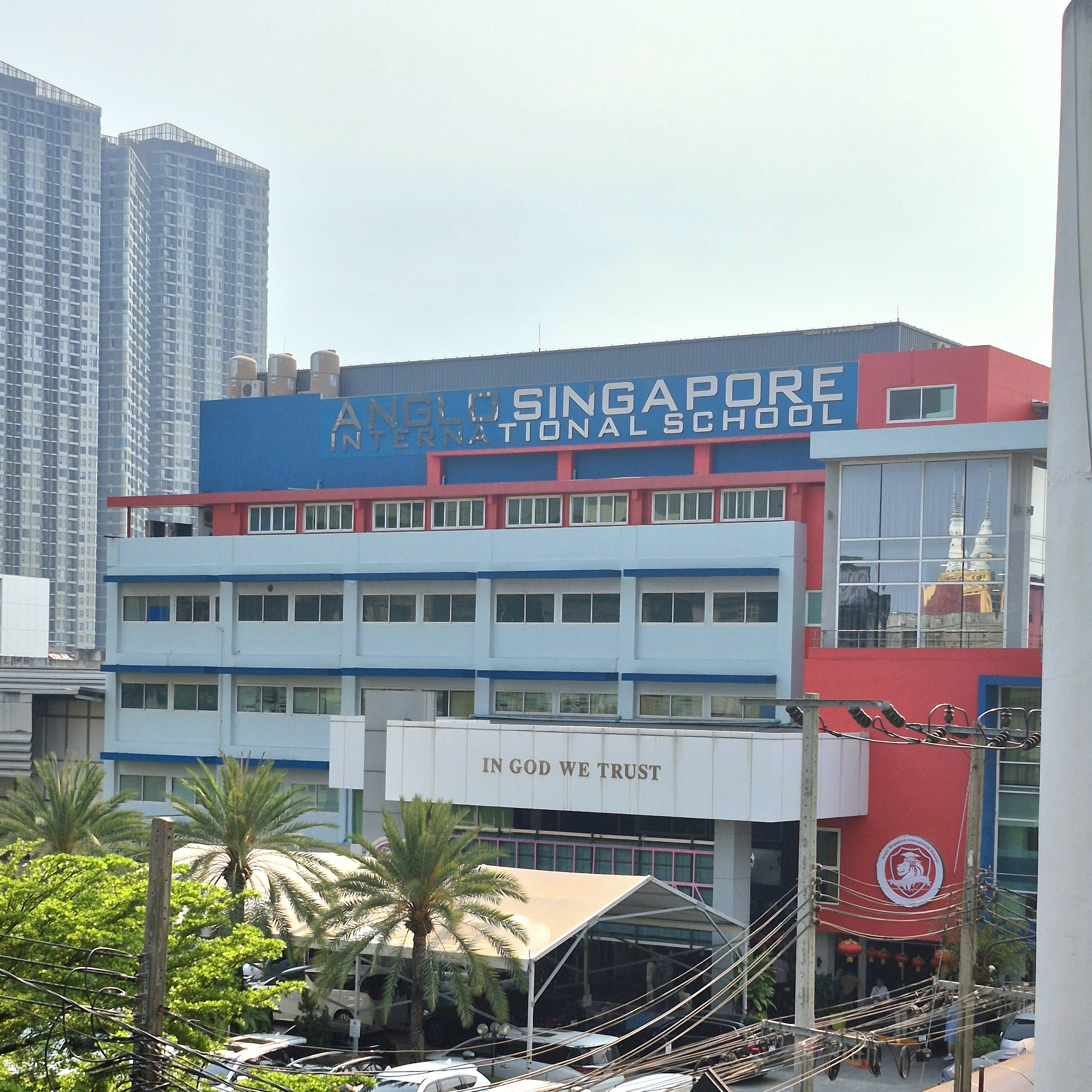
- Campus 64 of Anglo Singapore International School

Location
- No.1, Sukhumvit Soi 64; Phra Khanong; Bangkok, 10120; Thailand; 13°41′17.42″N 100°36′33.69″E

Information
- Type: Private, International School
- Motto: "Learn to Think, Think to Learn"
- Established: 2003
- Founder: Julie Sutanto
- Grades: Toddler – Junior College 2
- Colors: Red, Black
- Mascot: Anglo Lion
- Accreditations: CIS, WASC

Anglo Singapore International School (Thai: โรงเรียนนานาชาติแองโกลสิงคโปร์, RTGS: Rong Rian Nana Chat Aengkon Singkhapo) is an International School in Phra Khanong District, Bangkok, Thailand established in 2003 that provides an education based on Singapore Curriculum Framework leading to the Cambridge IGCSE. The school is a member of International Schools Association of Thailand. It has three campuses. The first campus is situated at Sukhumvit 31, the second campus is at Sukhumvit 64 and Anglo Nakhon Ratchasima being the third.

== History ==
The school opened in 2003 with four students in its one-block Soi Sukhumvit 31 campus. The school stated that the site was chosen because of its "central yet secluded environment." Its second campus opened by 2011, and by then the school had over 500 students from over 20 countries of origin. The Nakhon Ratchasima facility is scheduled to open in August 2014.

== Locations ==
Campus 31 is in the Watthana District of Bangkok. The school states that the original campus "maintains its natural rustic beauty that is close to nature".

Campus 64 is in Phra Khanong District, Bangkok. It is in proximity to the BTS Skytrain Punnawithi Station. The school describes the campus, which serves Kindergarten through Junior college, as "a purpose-built school".

Its Nakhon Ratchasima campus is in Nakhon Ratchasima in the Isan region.

== Curriculum ==
Anglo Singapore International School offers a holistic education based on the Singapore Curriculum Framework leading to the Cambridge IGCSE/AS/A-Level exams. Students will retain fluency in English, mother tongue (Mandarin Chinese, Japanese, and Korean) and Thai.

== Accreditation and affiliations ==
- Licensed by Ministry of Education (Thailand)
- Licensed by Cambridge International Examinations to offer learning and conduct examinations for IGCSE and A/AS Level
- Licensed testing center for BMAT, TSA, PAT, MAT, STEP, MLAT, Classics Admissions Test (CAT) & Oriental Languages Aptitude Test (OLAT)
- Accredited by the Council of International Schools, Western Association of Schools and Colleges and ONESQA
- Member of International Schools Association of Thailand

== Scholarships ==
The following are scholarships available at Anglo Singapore International School:

- Professor Yeap Ban Har Scholarship Programme
- Debate Scholarship Programme
- Academic Scholarship Programme
- Performing Arts Scholarship Programme
- Athletic Scholarship Programme

== Events ==
Anglo Singapore International School hosted the 3rd Thailand World Debating Championship in 2012.

In 2013, ANGLO launched the Asia World Schools Debating Championship tournament series.
