= Graduate Medical Program =

Graduate Medical Program (GMP), or sometimes also known as Graduate Entry Program (GEP) or Graduate Entry Medicine (GEM), are medical programs usually of 4-years duration where applicants are university graduates who have taken aptitude tests such as the GAMSAT, UKCAT or MCAT. These aptitude tests are different from the UMAT test for high school graduates. Medical programs in the United States technically do not require the completion of a previous degree, but do require the completion of 2–3 years of pre-medical sciences at the university level and so are thus classified as second entry degrees. However, since in places such as Australia medical applicants were historically generally high school graduates and only recently have medical schools changed to requiring the completion of a previous bachelor's degree, the terms Graduate Medical Program and Graduate Entry Medicine arose to differentiate the new courses.

== Some countries currently offering 4-year medical courses for university degree holders ==
=== Europe ===
- Ireland
- Czech Republic
- Netherlands
- Portugal
- Ukraine
- United Kingdom
- Georgia

=== Rest of world ===
- Australia
- Canada
- Israel
- United States
- Malaysia (Perdana University – University of San Diego – PUGScM)
- South Africa
- Singapore
- Philippines
- Ghana
- Lebanon
- UAE
- South Korea has graduated medical schools and special admission for scholar
- Japan has special admission program for scholar
- Caribbean
- Mexico
- Qatar (Weill Cornell)

== See also ==
- First professional degree
- Medical education
