= Test of Mathematics for University Admission =

University entrance examination

- Acronym: TMUA
- Type: Computer-based standardised admissions test
- Administrator: UAT-UK (Pearson VUE)
- Skills tested: Mathematical thinking and reasoning
- Purpose: University admissions for mathematics-based undergraduate courses
- Year started: 2016
- Duration: 2 hours 30 minutes (2 papers of 75 minutes each)
- Score range: 1.0 to 9.0
- Offered: Twice per year (October/November and January)
- Restrictions on attempts: January sitting not available to most University of Cambridge or University of Oxford applicants
- Regions: United Kingdom and international centres
- Languages: English
- Prerequisites: Higher Level GCSE Mathematics or AS-level Mathematics
- Fee: £78 (UK/Republic of Ireland); £133 (international)
- Used by: University of Cambridge, University of Oxford, Imperial College London, London School of Economics, University of Warwick, Durham University, University College London
- Website: esat-tmua.ac.uk

The Test of Mathematics for University Admission (TMUA) is a test used by universities in the United Kingdom to assess the mathematical thinking and reasoning skills of students applying for undergraduate mathematics courses or courses featuring mathematics like Computer Science or Economics. It is usually sat by students in the UK; however, students applying from other countries will need to do so as well if their university requires it. A number of universities across the world accept the test as an optional part of their application process for mathematics-based courses. The TMUA exams from 2017 were paper-based; however, since 2024 it has transitioned to being administered through a computer, where applicants may use a Whiteboard notebook to write their working out.

== History ==
The test was developed by Cambridge Assessment Admissions Testing and launched in 2016. Cambridge Assessment described the TMUA as having been developed in response to interest from universities seeking an additional admissions factor for mathematics applicants, while being more accessible to students than STEP. During its development, Cambridge Assessment conducted a trial with first-year undergraduate mathematics students at Durham University in October 2015; the trial linked students' TMUA scores with background information and first-year undergraduate examination results in order to investigate the test's concurrent and predictive validity. The test was designed to assess the key skills that students need to succeed on demanding university-level mathematics courses, and to assist university mathematics tutors in making admissions decisions.

Durham University and Lancaster University began using the test in 2016, with the University of Warwick, the University of Sheffield and the University of Southampton recognising the test in 2017, and the London School of Economics and Political Science (LSE) and Cardiff University in 2018

Research indicates that the test has good predictive validity, with good correlation between candidates' scores in the test and their performance in their exams at the end of first year university study. There is also correlation between A-level Further Maths performance and performance in the test.

== Changes ==
Before 2024, the test was administered by Cambridge Assessment Admissions Testing, but since the 2024 round, it has been administered by Pearson Vue instead. Candidates now complete the exam in a Pearson test center, when the previously would have sat the test at their school or at a registered test centre. Under the new format, mathematical working is completed in booklets of laminated paper using whiteboard markers, where candidates may request new booklets for writing in when needed.

== Test format and specification ==
The Test of Mathematics for University Admission is a computer-based 2 hour and 30 minute long test, which is to be completed without dictionaries or calculators. It has two papers which are taken consecutively:

Paper 1: Mathematical Thinking
Paper 1 has 20 multiple-choice questions, with 75 minutes allowed to complete the paper. This paper assesses a candidate's ability to apply their knowledge of mathematics in new situations. It comprises a core set of ideas from Pure Mathematics. These ideas reflect those that would be met early on in a typical A Level Mathematics course: algebra, basic functions, sequences and series, coordinate geometry, trigonometry, exponentials and logarithms, differentiation, integration, graphs of functions. In addition, knowledge of the GCSE curriculum is assumed.

Paper 2: Mathematical Reasoning
Paper 2 has 20 multiple-choice questions, with 75 minutes allowed to complete the paper. The second paper assesses a candidate's ability to justify and interpret mathematical arguments and conjectures, and deal with elementary concepts from logic. It assumes knowledge of the Paper 1 specification and, in addition, requires students to have some knowledge of the structure of proof and basic logical concepts.

== Scoring ==
There is no pass/fail for the test, however a higher score will generally improve the candidate's chances of being admitted to their university of choice. Candidates’ scores is the total number of correct answers given in both papers. As it is multiple choice, working out is not counted. Each question has the same weighting, and no penalties are given for incorrect answers. Raw scores are converted to a scale of 1.0 to 9.0 (with 9.0 being the highest).

== Timing and results ==
Since 2024, the test is made available twice a year, first in late October or early November and secondly in January (Previously, it used to be just in October). Entry for the test typically opens in September and candidates must be registered by early October. Results are released in late November. Candidates can access their results online and scores are automatically distributed to universities requiring the TMUA that they have applied for.

== Preparation ==
Students generally spend several weeks preparing for the TMUA exam. There are various different preparation materials available for students wanting to get ready for the exam such as textbooks, courses and online materials. Completing past papers is generally agreed to be a highly effective means of preparing for the test, as they are directly representative of what the exam is like. The past papers are freely available from the exam administrator, and various other sources. Answer keys are also released alongside TMUA past papers.
