= University admissions tests in the United Kingdom =

In the United Kingdom there are various standardized tests for admission to university. Most applicants to universities in the UK take national examinations such as A-levels or Scottish Highers. Separate admissions tests are used by a small number of universities for specific subjects (particularly law, mathematics and medicine, and courses at Oxford and Cambridge), many of these administered by Cambridge University's Admissions Testing Service.

== English Literature Admissions Test ==
The English Literature Admissions Test (ELAT) was a subject-specific admissions test, used as part of the admissions process for undergraduate courses in English language and literature, combined English and modern languages and classics and English at the University of Oxford. As of 2016, ELAT had also been used by the University of Cambridge for admission to its undergraduate English course.

ELAT was held pre-interview stage, in late October/early November. Results were available to candidates and test centres via the Cambridge Assessment Admissions Testing Results Online website up to and including October 2022. Administration of the test in 2023 was conducted by Tata Consultancy Services.

== History Aptitude Test ==
The History Aptitude Test (HAT) is a standardized test used as part of the admissions process to Oxford University for undergraduates applying to read history, or a subject including history, for example English with history.

The one-hour test is currently only employed by Oxford University, though other universities are considering adopting a similar examination as part of admissions.

== Modern and Medieval Languages Test ==
The Modern and Medieval Languages Test (MML) is a university admissions test used in the United Kingdom. It is currently used by the University of Cambridge.

== National Admissions Test for Law ==
The National Admissions Test for Law, or LNAT, is an admissions aptitude test that was adopted in 2004 by eight UK university law programmes as an admissions requirement for home applicants. The test was established at the leading urgency of the University of Oxford as an answer to the problem facing universities trying to select from an increasingly competitive pool with similarly high A-levels. With effect from its second year, the LNAT is required for UK and overseas applicants alike. There are now nine participating law schools and hundreds of test centres worldwide.

== Sixth Term Examination Paper ==
The Sixth Term Examination Paper (commonly referred to as STEP) is a university mathematics-based admissions test for undergraduate courses with significant mathematical content, most notably for applying to study mathematics at the University of Cambridge. Since 2024, STEP was administered by OCR, replacing CAAT, who was responsible for administering STEP in previous years. Being after the reply date for universities in the UK, STEP is typically taken as part of a conditional offer for an undergraduate place. There are also a small number of candidates who sit STEP as a challenge. The papers are designed to test ability to answer questions similar in style to undergraduate mathematics.

The official users of STEP in mathematics at present are the University of Cambridge, Imperial College London, and the University of Warwick. Since the 2025 entry application cycle, the STEP exams have been superseded by the TMUA exam at Imperial College London and the University of Warwick. Candidates applying to study mathematics at the University of Cambridge are almost always required to take STEP as part of the terms of their conditional offer. In addition, other courses at Cambridge with a large mathematics component, such as Economics and Engineering, occasionally require STEP. Candidates applying to study Mathematics or closely related subjects at the University of Warwick can take STEP as part of their offer. Imperial College London may require it for Computing applicants as well as mathematics applicants who either did not take MAT or achieved a borderline score in it.

A typical STEP offer for a candidate applying to read mathematics at the University of Cambridge would be at least a grade 1 in both STEP 2 and STEP 3, though – depending on individual circumstances – some colleges may only require a grade 1 in either STEP. Candidates applying to the University of Warwick to read mathematics, or joint subjects such as MORSE, can use a grade 2 from either STEP as part of their offer. Imperial typically requires a grade 2 in STEP 2 and/or STEP 3.

== Mathematics Admissions Test ==
The Mathematics Admissions Test (MAT) is a 2-hour 30-minute subject-specific admissions test for applicants to the University of Oxford, and until the 2024-2025 school year, also both the University of Warwick and Imperial College London for undergraduate degree courses in mathematics, computer science and their joint degrees. It is set with the aim of being approachable by all students, including those without further mathematics A Level.

The MAT is held pre-interview stage at the beginning of November. Test results are not published automatically, but for the University of Oxford, candidates may request their test score as part of the usual University of Oxford feedback process.

The MAT was last held in 2025. From the 2026 admissions round, Oxford applicants for Mathematics, Computer Science and their joint honours courses take the TMUA instead.

== Test of Mathematics for University Admission ==
The Test of Mathematics for University Admission (TMUA) is an admissions test used for some undergraduate courses in mathematics, computer science and economics. Since 2024 it has been run by UAT-UK, a not-for-profit joint venture between Imperial College London and the University of Cambridge established in 2023, and it is taken on computer at Pearson VUE test centres.

The test lasts 2 hours 30 minutes and is split into two papers, Applications of Mathematical Knowledge and Mathematical Reasoning. Each has 20 multiple-choice questions to be answered in 75 minutes. Calculators and dictionaries are not allowed, and wrong answers are not penalised. Candidates receive a single overall score on a scale from 1.0 to 9.0. The fee is £78 for candidates in the UK and Republic of Ireland and £133 elsewhere.

For 2027 entry the test is offered in two sittings, in October 2026 and January 2027. Applicants to the University of Oxford and the University of Cambridge must take the October sitting. Seven universities use the TMUA for some courses: Cambridge, Oxford, Imperial College London, the London School of Economics, the University of Warwick, Durham University and University College London. Oxford adopted the TMUA in place of the Mathematics Admissions Test from the 2026 admissions round.

== Physics Aptitude Test ==
The Physics Aptitude Test (PAT) is a 2-hour subject-specific admissions test for applicants to the University of Oxford for undergraduate degree courses in engineering, materials science and physics undergraduate degree courses.

The PAT is held pre-interview stage at the beginning of November. Test results are not published automatically, but candidates may request their test score as part of the usual University of Oxford feedback process.

== University Clinical Aptitude Test ==
University Clinical Aptitude Test
- Acronym: UCAT
- Type: Multiple choice
- Administrator: Pearson
- Year started: 2006
- Duration: 2 hours
- Score range: 900–2700 and Bands 1–4
- Score validity: For admission to Consortium universities in the year following the test
- Offered: Early July–late September for UCAT UK and early July–early August for UCAT ANZ
- Restrictions on attempts: Once per cycle
- Languages: English
- Annual number of test takers: ▲41,354 (UK 2025); ▲16,950 (ANZ 2025)

The University Clinical Aptitude Test (UCAT) is an admissions test used by most medical and dental schools in the United Kingdom, Singapore, Australia and New Zealand in their applicant selection processes. Launched in 2006 as the UK Clinical Aptitude Test (UKCAT), it was renamed in 2019 following the launch of the test in Australia and New Zealand as a replacement for the Undergraduate Medicine and Health Sciences Admission Test (UMAT).

In the UK, the UCAT was one of two main admissions tests used for medical, dental and other health-related courses, the other being the BioMedical Admissions Test (BMAT). Following the BMAT's cancellation from 2024 onwards, all ex-BMAT universities have moved to using the UCAT for their undergraduate medical courses, including Oxford and Cambridge.

In 2025, the UK version of the test had 41,354 test takers whilst the ANZ version had 16,950.

In 2026 there were 42,359 takers of the UK version of the UCAT.
