= International Medical Admissions Test =

Italian university admissions aptitude test

The International Medical Admissions Test (IMAT) is an aptitude test used for admissions into undergraduate medicine and dentistry programs at select Italian universities. These programs are distinct from their Italian-taught counterparts, as they are delivered in English and are primarily designed for international students.

As of 2023, the IMAT is administered solely by the Italian Ministry of Education, Universities, and Research (MIUR). Previously, the test was conducted in collaboration with Cambridge Assessment Admissions Testing, which is no longer involved in its administration.

== Participants ==
The following universities offer a number of places for both home and overseas students to study medicine as part of this initiative. There is a separate ranking between EU and non-EU candidates, therefore the minimum scores to enter each university differ between the two as well. The following is the number of seats allocated for both EU and NON-EU students at universities in Italy for the year of 2026:

	EU	NON-EU
Sapienza University of Rome	52	13
University of Milan	60	15
University of Pavia	103	40
University of Bologna	140	20
University of Padova - Venice	75	25
University of Padua MedTech	70	15
University of Rome Tor Vergata - Rome	65	20
University of Rome Tor Vergata - Tirana	0	320
University of Turin - Orbassano	75	32
University of Milan-Bicocca - Bergamo	40	20
University of Naples Federico II	35	45
University of Parma - Piacenza	80	50
University of Messina	55	61
University of Campania Luigi Vanvitelli - Naples	70	50
University of Bari	89	11
University of Florence	50	0
Marche Polytechnic University - Ancona	30	50
University of Catania	40	40
University of Cagliari	80	18
University of Siena (Dentistry)	23	12
Sapienza University of Rome (Dentistry)	30	5
University of Bologna (Veterinary Medicine)	45	5
University of Naples Federico II (Veterinary Medicine)	18	2

Admission to the Italian-language Medicine, Dentistry and Veterinary Medicine programmes was reformed beginning with the 2025–26 academic year. The previous admission-test system for these Italian-taught courses was replaced by an open first semester followed by a national merit ranking. The reform does not apply to degree programmes taught in English, which continue to use a separate national admission examination.

The International Medical Admissions Test was introduced in 2011 through a collaboration between the Italian Ministry of Education, University and Research and Cambridge Assessment. Cambridge Assessment developed and delivered the English-language admissions test for entry to English-taught medical degree programmes in Italy. Cambridge Assessment is no longer responsible for the current examination. For the 2026–27 academic year, the Ministry of University and Research commissioned CINECA to prepare the questions and organise and manage the examination at Italian and overseas test centres.

For the 2026–27 academic year, the same English-language examination is used for admission to nationally regulated English-taught programmes in Medicine and Surgery (LM-41), Dentistry and Dental Prosthodontics (LM-46), and Veterinary Medicine (LM-42). The examination is identical at all test centres.

Candidates register for the examination through the Universitaly portal. Candidates from European Union countries, together with non-EU candidates who are treated as equivalent under Italian law, list the participating universities in order of preference. If a candidate chooses to take the examination in Italy, the university entered as the candidate's first preference automatically becomes the test centre, and the test cannot be taken at a different Italian university. Candidates who take the examination abroad select one of the overseas test centres designated by MUR.

For EU candidates and qualifying non-EU candidates resident in Italy, admission is determined through national merit rankings that take into account the candidate's score, the number of places available at each university and the order of university preferences submitted during registration. Non-EU candidates residing abroad compete separately for places reserved for this category and are included only in the local ranking of the university at which they submitted their pre-enrolment application.

== Format and timing ==
As of 2023, the format of the IMAT is as follows:

- Section 1: Reading Skills and General Knowledge. This section tests skills in understanding arguments in paragraphs and the general knowledge of the candidate (4 questions).
- Section 2: Logical Reasoning. This section tests the candidates' logical reasoning ability (5 questions).
- Section 3, 4 and 5: Scientific Knowledge. These sections test a candidate's ability to apply scientific knowledge from school science. The scientific fields tested are Biology (23 questions), Chemistry (15 questions), and Physics and Mathematics (13 questions combined)

Recently candidates have been allowed a total of 100 minutes to complete the test (60 questions). All questions had five options, of which one was correct. A correct answer was awarded 1.5 points, a blank answer 0 points and a wrong answer subtracted 0.4 points from the final score.

The score for each section is calculated separately, then combined and ranked. If two candidates have the same combined score, the one who scores higher in Logical Reasoning and General Knowledge will be ranked higher. If the score in Section Logical Reasoning and General Knowledge is also the same, then the ranking is based on the one who scores higher in Biology, followed by Chemistry, Mathematics and Physics. If the scores for each section are the same, then the candidate who has an English Language certification (IELTS, TOEFL) will be ranked higher. If both candidates have all the necessary documents, then younger candidate will be ranked higher.

For Italian and EU candidates, there is a minimum cumulative score of 20 points in order to be eligible for entry. For Non-EU citizens, the minimum cumulative score for entry is more than 0.

The format of the test is confirmed when the Italian Ministry of Education, Universities and Research (MIUR) publish the IMAT decree.

IMAT takes place usually in September. The enrollment is normally opened in June or July for about 2 to 3 weeks.

In 2025, 13,495 candidates sat the IMAT, compared with 10,931 in 2024. A total of 1,049 places were available through the national ranking, including 952 places in Medicine and Surgery, 52 in Dentistry and Dental Prosthodontics, and 45 in Veterinary Medicine.
