= SMJ =

SMJ may refer to:

- Singapore Medical Journal
- Southern Medical Journal
- SM Entertainment Japan
- Lule Sami language (ISO 639-2 language code)
- Subject-matter jurisdiction
