= Academic dress of the University of Oxford =

Dressing code worn by academics at the University of Oxford during specific ceremonies

The University of Oxford has a long tradition of academic dress, which continues to the present day.

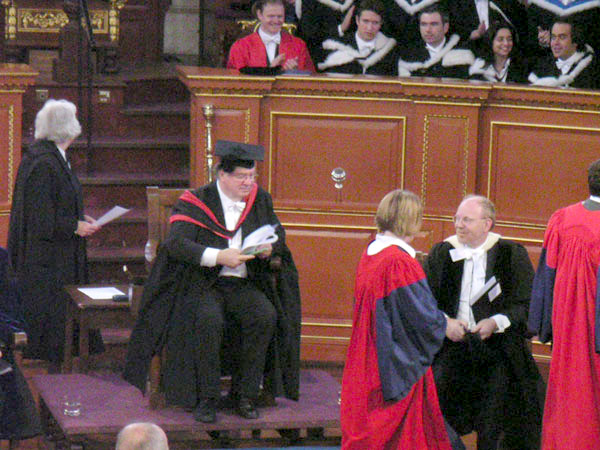
An Oxford degree ceremony – the pro-vice-chancellor in MA gown and hood, proctor in official dress and new Doctors of Philosophy in scarlet full dress. Behind them, a bedel, another Doctor and Bachelors of Arts and Medicine.

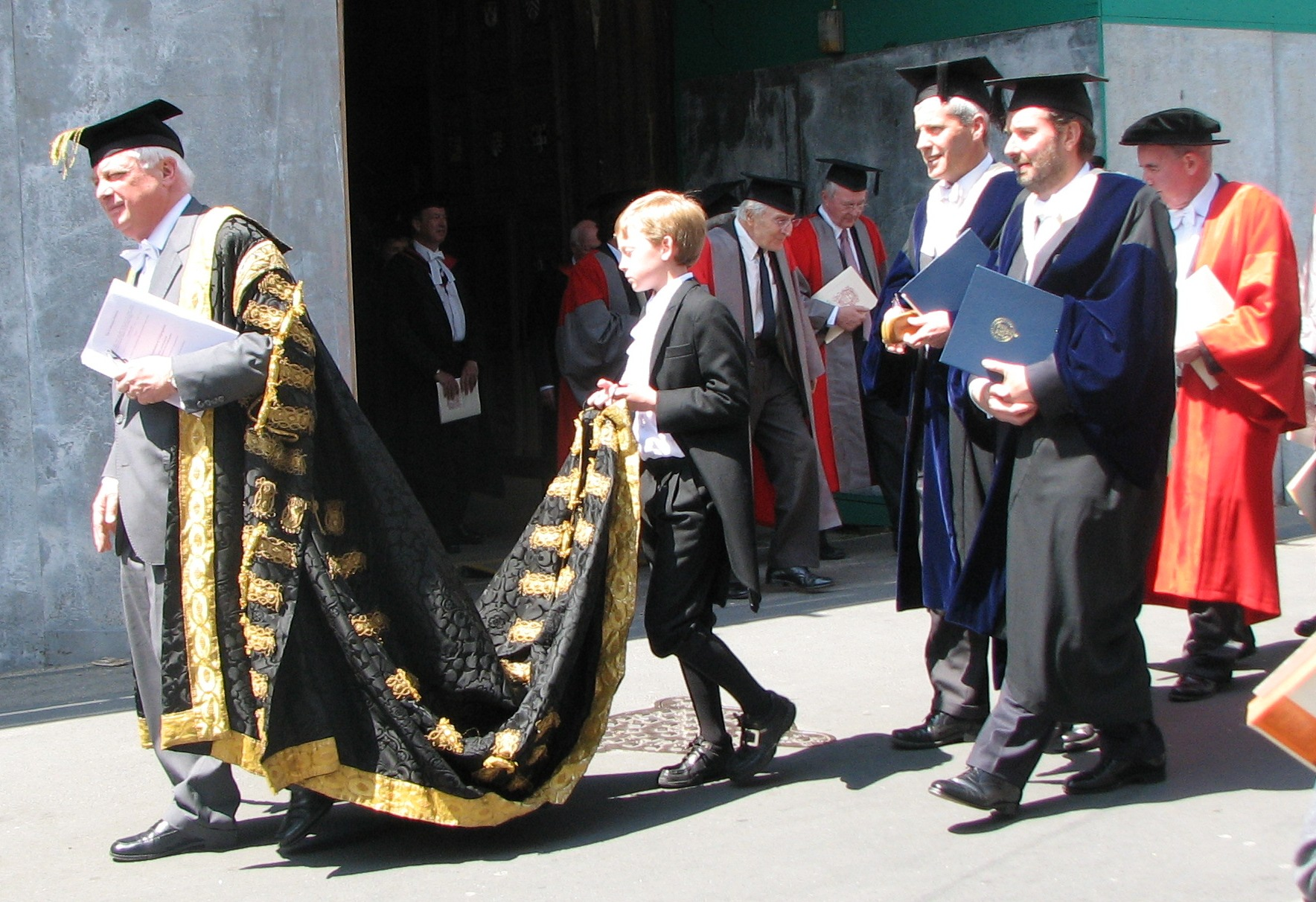
Encaenia Procession: The chancellor (with trainbearer) immediately followed by the university proctors and others

== Occasions for use ==
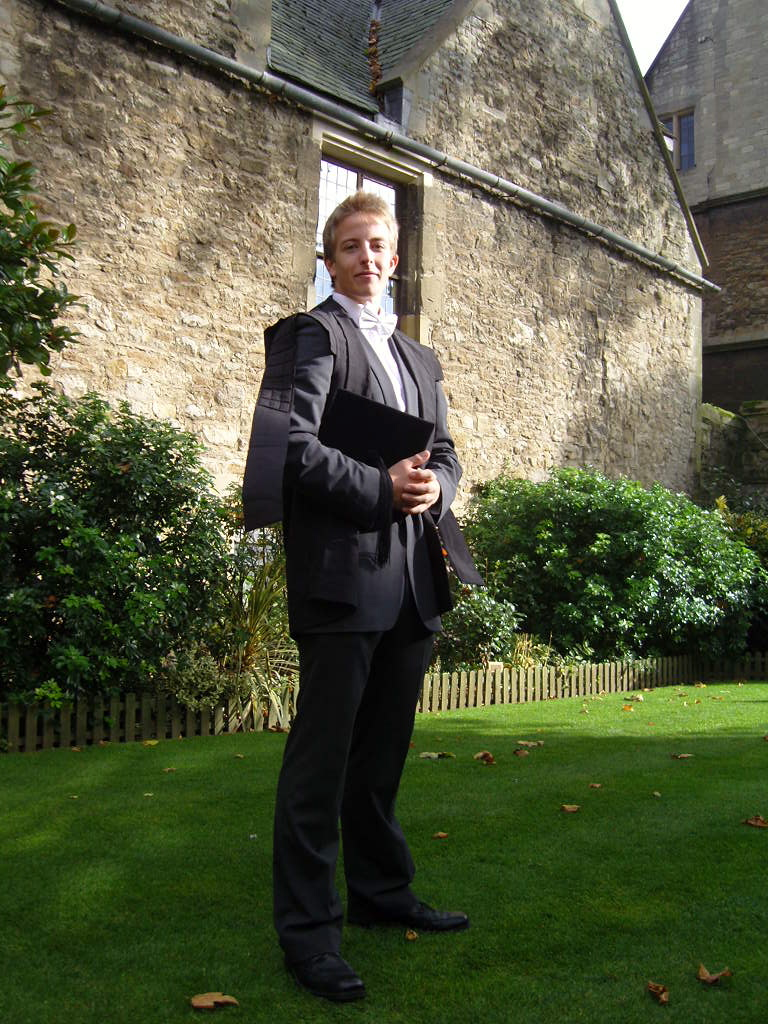
An undergraduate student at the University of Oxford in subfusc for Matriculation in Michaelmas

Unlike most other universities, which only usually require it during specific university ceremonies such as graduation, academic dress is worn very often in Oxford (although no longer as an element of everyday dress). Every undergraduate and graduate must obtain a gown, cap, and white bow tie or black tie or black ribbon for the purpose of the university matriculation ceremony, where students formally become members of the university.

Regulations regarding gowns differ from college to college, but gowns are commonly worn to:

- Formal Hall (formal dinner, which occurs as frequently as every night in some colleges and as rarely as once a term in others, or not at all)
- Major public lectures
- Chapel
- College collections (internal examinations at the start of term)
- Head of house's collections (end of term academic progress reports)
- College matriculation

Gowns and caps are worn to disciplinary hearings in the Proctors' Court.

In addition, gowns are worn with cap, hood (for graduates), and subfusc to:

- University examinations
- University matriculation
- Graduation ceremonies
- The annual Encaenia (Commemoration) ceremony.

On certain occasions, e.g. the Encaenia garden party, by tradition, graduates wear gown and hood without subfusc.

The wearing of subfusc remains a popular tradition. In May 2015 students voted overwhelmingly in favour of compulsory academic dress in examinations, with 75.8% supporting subfusc and 78% supporting gowns, in a referendum with an unusually high 40.6% turnout. A previous referendum in 2006 showed 81% support for subfusc. Both referendums were widely interpreted by students as a vote not so much as on making subfusc voluntary, but rather on whether or not to effectively abolish it by default, as it was assumed that if a minority of people came to exams without subfusc, the rest would soon follow.

== Components ==
After the names of the components, the Groves classification system is given.

=== Gowns ===
The gowns in use in Oxford can be divided into two basic shapes. All gowns are open-fronted, except for the Doctors' convocation habit which is closed at the front.

==== Clerical-type gowns ====
- Scholars' gown [u2]
- BA gown [b1]
- MA gown [m1]
- BD gown [m1]
- DD undress gown [m1]
- Doctors' full dress gown [d2]
- Doctors' convocation habit [d5]
- Proctors' dress gown [d2]

The clerical-type gown has no collar, but instead has the voluminous material of its back and sleeves gathered into a yoke. Most of the above have open sleeves; those of the BA have long points at the back of the sleeve reaching down to the hem of the gown, while doctors', assessors' and proctors' gowns have bell-shaped sleeves about wrist-length. Scholar's gowns reach only the wearer's knees, and their open sleeves are either bell-shaped or pointed, reaching just beyond the elbow. The exceptions are the MA gown and the Doctors' convocation habit; the MA gown has long closed sleeves with arm slits just above the elbow and a crescent-shaped cut at the foot of the sleeve, forming two forward-facing points, while the Doctors' convocation habit is sleeveless.

Gowns of the same basic shape are worn by barristers (see court dress), preachers and bishops in the Church of England.

==== Lay-type gowns ====
- Commoners' gown [u5]
- Graduate students' gown [u5]
- Higher faculties bachelors' and masters' laced gown [d4]
- Doctors' undress laced gown [d4]
- Chancellor's/Vice-Chancellor's gold laced gown [d4]
- Bedels', University Verger's, etc. gown [d4]

The lay-type gown derives from a garment fashionable in Elizabethan times. It is less voluminous than the clerical-type gown, and has a flap collar and long closed sleeves with arm slits just above the elbow, except for the Commoners' and Graduate students' gowns, whose closed sleeves have evolved into streamers through which the arm does not pass. Commoners' gowns reach to the wearer's waist, and Graduates' to around their knees. Doctors' undress gowns are the same as those of higher faculties Bachelors and Masters gowns, with the addition of even more decorative lace on the underside of the sleeves.

Gowns of the same basic shape are worn by solicitors, King's Counsel, court ushers, the Speaker of the House of Commons, the Chancellor of the Exchequer, and the Lord Chancellor.

=== Hoods ===
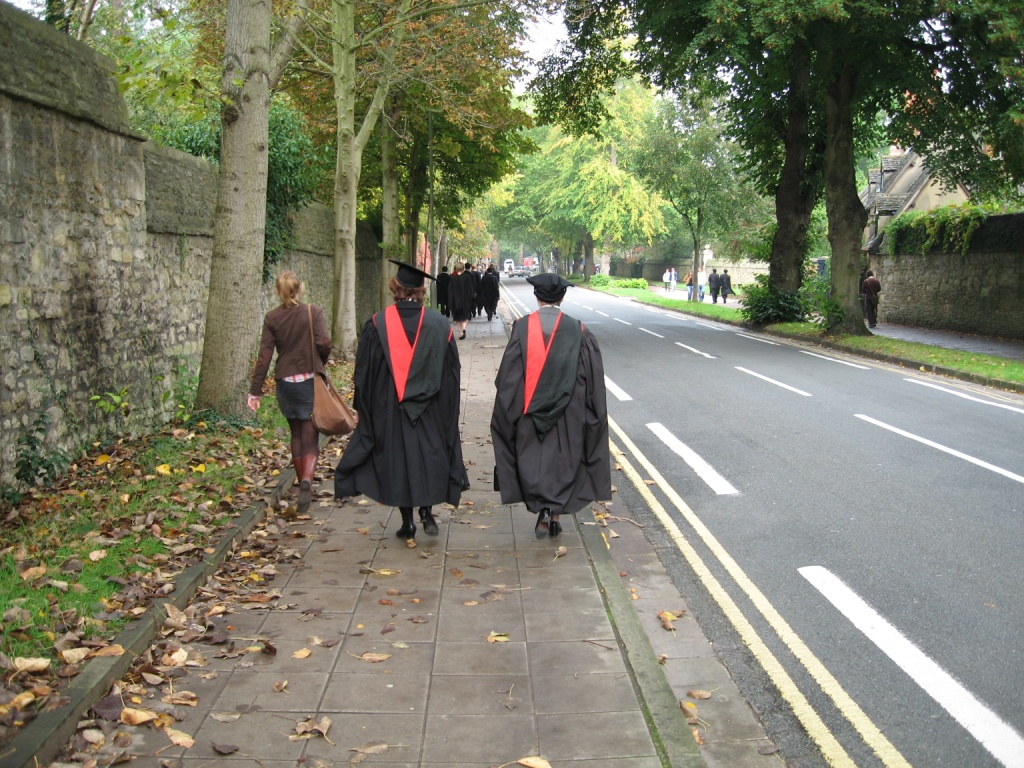
MA hoods seen from rear

Hoods in Oxford are of three shapes. Doctors (except Doctors of Clinical Psychology and Doctors of Engineering) and Bachelors of Divinity wear hoods in the Oxford full shape [f5], scarlet in the case of doctors and black in the case of Bachelors of Divinity. All other hoods can be either in the Burgon shape [s2] or the Oxford simple shape [s1], though some are traditionally made in one shape or the other. Most of the newer degrees use the Burgon whilst older degrees use either, although the Burgon shape is becoming more popular.

Generally, hoods are worn by graduates whenever subfusc is worn, but sometimes they are worn with an ordinary tie, e.g. by the lecturer at a public lecture.

=== Academic caps ===
Men wear a mortarboard (also known as a square or trencher cap) [h1], which is not worn indoors, except by the Chancellor, Vice-Chancellor and Proctors. When meeting the Vice-Chancellor, Proctors, or other senior official of the university in the street, it is traditional for a man to touch or raise his cap.

Women may choose between the mortarboard or the soft cap [h5]. Originally, women were required to wear their soft caps during university ceremonies. From Michaelmas 1995, they were required to wear the soft cap, but permitted either to wear or to carry the mortarboard. From Hilary 2008, they are now, like men, required to carry their mortarboards when at university ceremonies indoors. Women who opt for the soft cap must still wear, and not carry, them indoors.

Doctors in the lay faculties (i.e. those except Divinity and Philosophy) wear Tudor bonnets [h2], which are round and made of velvet.

=== Subfusc ===
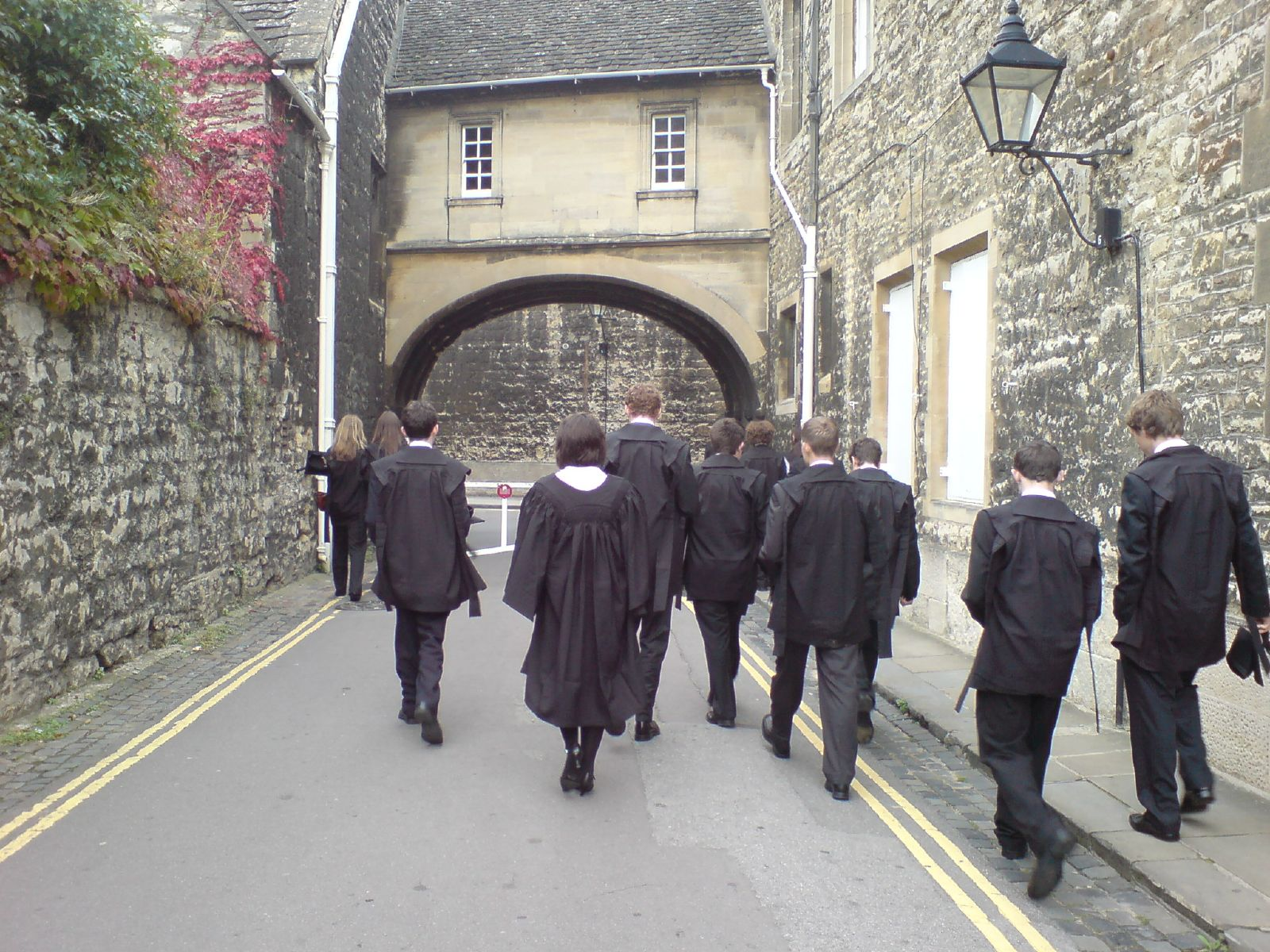
Oxford undergraduates walking along New College Lane some wearing short commoners' gowns over subfusc suits: this is required wear only for very formal occasions such as examinations, matriculation and graduation.

Subfusc (/sʌbˈfʌsk/) comes from the Latin for 'of a dark/dusky colour', and refers to the clothes worn with full academic dress in Oxford. Their origins stem from the formal day dress worn in the past that has, to a certain extent, fossilised around the Edwardian period into what it is now and has changed only slightly since to accommodate modern trends and needs.

As of October 2012, the University of Oxford regulations on subfusc have no reference to sex, meaning students of either sex can wear what is historically prescribed as male or female clothing, or, under the letter of the regulations, even a combination (although this is informally discouraged).

Previously, men were required to wear:

- Dark suit and socks.
- Black shoes.
- White shirt and collar.
- White bow tie.

Women were previously required to wear:

- White blouse.
- Black tie (either a bow tie or velvet ribbon).
- Black skirt or trousers.
- Black stockings or tights.
- Black shoes.
- Dark coat (if desired).

In addition, doctors in the higher faculties and senior university officials wear bands, such as those worn with legal court dress.

Members of the British Armed Forces may wear their service uniform with gown and hood (for graduates) in place of subfusc and cap. There is no formal guidance about what order of dress should be worn or whether swords are worn; however, uniform caps are worn in the street and carried when indoors. Persons in Holy Orders may wear clerical dress instead of subfusc.

Subfusc is worn at university matriculation, at university examinations and degree ceremonies and at Encaenia. It is traditional, although not compulsory, that during exams, candidates also wear a carnation: white for the first exam, pink thereafter, and red for the final exam of the run. The one exception to this is found in the law students of Magdalen College, who wear green carnations for all of their Law Moderations. Although this system has differed over time, this is the one currently advised by the university and its Colleges. The carnations are often, although not necessarily, gifted to candidates by friends or members of their college "families".

A number of myths surround subfusc and its use in examinations - for example, that subfusc has a counterpart in 'full fusc', said to be a full suit of armour, which if worn to Finals examinations automatically results in a student being given a First; or the claim that one enterprising undergraduate examined the university statutes prior to an examination and discovered that all students sitting exams in full fusc are entitled to a glass of sherry. He demanded his due in the exam, and the university's proctors duly responded, before fining him one shilling for failing to wear his sword, allegedly also part of the archaic statutes. This latter story is disputed as untrue, and has been circulating in various forms (sometimes attributed to Cambridge) since at least the late 1950s.

=== Materials ===
Although gowns and robes have traditionally been made from stuff, Russell cord or (in the case of members of the higher faculties) silk, most modern gowns and robes are made from synthetic material such as polyester. Similarly, hoods and gowns traditionally made out of silk are now more usually made of synthetic "art silk". Rabbit fur is also rarely now used in the making of bachelors' hoods, with artificial fur used instead.

== Student dress ==
=== Undergraduates ===
Commoners (undergraduates without a scholarship or exhibition) wear a short black lay-type gown which just covers the suit jacket. The gowns have a flap collar and instead of sleeves have two streamers adorned with folds. These are the remnants of closed sleeves, as can still be seen on the laced gowns of the higher faculties.

Scholars (and some exhibitioners) wear a black clerical-type gown down to the knee. The gowns are gathered at the yoke, and have bell sleeves to the elbows (in effect they are shorter versions of the BA gown). For undergraduates, scholars are likely to be students who received a distinction in their first-year examinations, or who have received a scholarship for academic excellence in a specific topic. As a very general approximation, students wearing scholars' gowns may be predicted to achieve a first-class degree on completion of their final examinations.

Until the abolition of their statuses in the nineteenth century, gentlemen-commoners and noblemen-commoners each had distinct gowns, generally of coloured silk in the lay shape, decorated with lace.

==== Undergraduates and mortarboards ====
It is often claimed that undergraduates by custom do not wear their caps (or even that they can be fined for doing so). This is incorrect. Outdoors, caps may be worn, but it is customary to touch or raise one's cap as a salute to senior university or college officers. Like all other male members of the university (including graduates) other than the Chancellor, Vice-Chancellor and Proctors, male undergraduates must remove their caps during university ceremonies indoors.

It is also only in recent years that female undergraduates have been permitted to remove their mortarboards during university ceremonies. Women who opt for the mortarboard now no longer wear them indoors, but conform with the practice of male members of the university. As mentioned earlier, women who opt for the traditional women's soft cap still do not have this dispensation, and should remain covered at all times.

There are instances when male undergraduates are required to wear their mortarboards indoors. Undergraduates appearing before the Proctors' Court are required to present themselves wearing their caps and to salute the Proctors in the customary manner upon entering. They then remove their caps for the remainder of the proceedings.

=== Postgraduates ===
Graduate students who do not already have an Oxford degree wear a black lay-type gown that is a full-sized version of the commoner's gown, reaching to the knee. However, they are not worn by graduates of other universities who are reading for the degree of Bachelor of Arts, who wear a commoner's or scholar's gown as appropriate. Nor are they worn by non-members of the university reading for diplomas, who wear no gown, even with sub-fusc. Alternatively, graduate students may wear the academic dress of their old university except at those occasions where "foreign" academic dress is prohibited, such as the Encaenia and the second half of degree ceremonies when the graduand pays his respects to the Vice-Chancellor in the dress of his new Oxford degree.

== Graduate dress ==
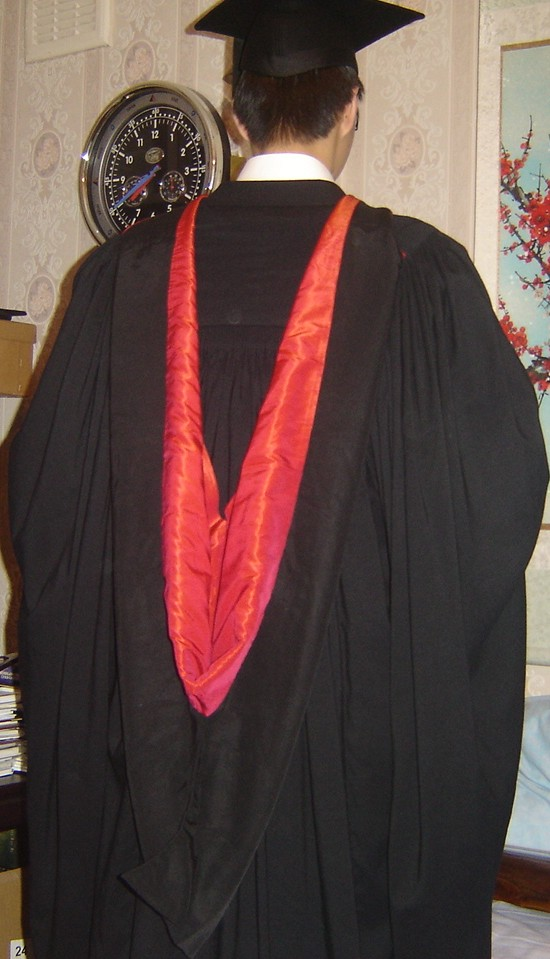
The MA hood. This hood is in Oxford simple-shape [s1] which is rarely used for MA hoods nowadays.

=== BA and MA ===
The two most common graduate gowns in Oxford are the Bachelor of Arts (BA) [b1] and Master of Arts (MA) [m1] gowns, which are worn by new graduates of whatever subject. The degree of Master of Arts is granted to BA graduates at a degree ceremony no sooner than 21 terms after matriculation.

The BA gown is a long black clerical-type gown with long bell-shaped sleeves to the wrists. The gown is gathered at the yoke. The MA gown is similar to the BA gown, except that the long sleeves are squared and closed at the ends, with a crescent cut out of each sleeve-end, and a horizontal slit just above the elbow for the arm to pass through.

The hoods are as follows:

- MA – black silk edged and lined with crimson / shot crimson silk
- BA – black silk half lined and bound with white rabbit fur

Those with undergraduate master's degrees awarded for certain 4-year courses in the sciences (M.Biochem., M.Chem., M.CompSci., M.EarthSci., M.Eng., M.Math., M.MathCompSci., M.MathPhil., M.Phys., M.PhysPhil.) previously wore BA gowns and hoods, transitioning to the MA gown and hood 21 terms after matriculation, but since 2014 they have worn the laced master's gown with a hood lined in sand fabric.

=== Doctors ===
Doctors in Oxford have three forms of academic dress: undress, full dress and convocation dress.

The undress gown in the lay faculties is a black lay-type gown with a flap collar and closed sleeves, decorated with black silk lace; for Doctors of Divinity, it is the MA gown in black silk. These may be worn with a doctor's hood, which varies between different doctors' degrees:

- DD – scarlet cloth (full shape) lined with black silk
- DCL, DM – scarlet cloth (full shape) lined with crimson silk
- DLitt, DSc – scarlet cloth (full shape) lined with grey silk
- DPhil – scarlet cloth (full shape) lined with dark blue silk

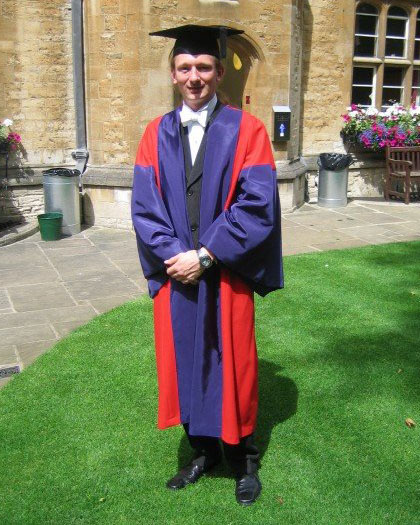
DPhil graduate in Full Academic Dress

The full dress gown is a scarlet clerical-type yoke-gathered gown, with open bell-shaped sleeves. The sleeves and facings are in the appropriate coloured silk. Full dress gowns are normally worn over sub-fusc, but never with a hood.

The convocation habit or chimere is like a scarlet full-dress gown, except in that it has no sleeves, is part-lined with silk of the appropriate colour, and closed at the front. It is worn over the undress gown, thus the sleeves of the latter protrude. It is always worn with white tie, bands and hood. A similar garment (in scarlet or black) is worn over a white rochet by Church of England bishops especially when sitting in the House of Lords.

Doctors of Music have no convocation habit, as this degree (as well as that of Bachelor of Music) was open to those who were not members of Convocation. The degree is known to have existed since the early 16th century, and seems to have originally used the same robes as Doctors of Medicine, on the rare occasions when this was necessary. However, since the beginning of the 17th century, Doctors of Music have worn gowns of white or cream damask or brocade, with facings and sleeve-linings (see below) present since at least the late 18th century: the latter are shown in a 1792 plate by Charles Grignion the Elder. Today, their full dress gown is made of cream silk brocade with apple blossom embroidery, with cherry red silk sleeves and facings. The hood worn with the undress gown is of the same materials:

- DMus – cream apple blossom silk brocade (full shape) lined with cherry silk.

=== Bachelors of Divinity ===
Bachelors of Divinity, unlike their counterparts in the other higher faculties, do not wear the black silk laced gown but wear a black undress gown of the clerical type, identical to the MA gown, but in silk rather than stuff. This is worn with a cassock, cincture and scarf. The hoods are as follows:

- BD – black corded silk (full shape) lined with black ribbed silk

=== Bachelors and Masters in the lay higher faculties ===
Members with postgraduate bachelors or master's degrees in the lay higher faculties (i.e. those other than Divinity or Arts) wear gowns almost identical to the lay doctors' undress gowns (with the exception of the MCh, the gowns of bachelors' and masters' do not have an extra panel of gimp underneath the arms).

The hoods of bachelors and masters of the lay higher faculties are as follows:

- MCh – black silk edged and lined with dark blue silk
- BCL, MJur, BM BCh – steel blue silk half lined and bound with white rabbit fur
- MLitt, MSc – light blue silk edged and lined with grey silk
- BLitt, BSc (no longer awarded) – light blue silk half lined and bound with white rabbit fur
- BMus – lilac silk half lined and bound with white rabbit fur
- MPhil, BPhil – dark blue silk edged and lined with white silk

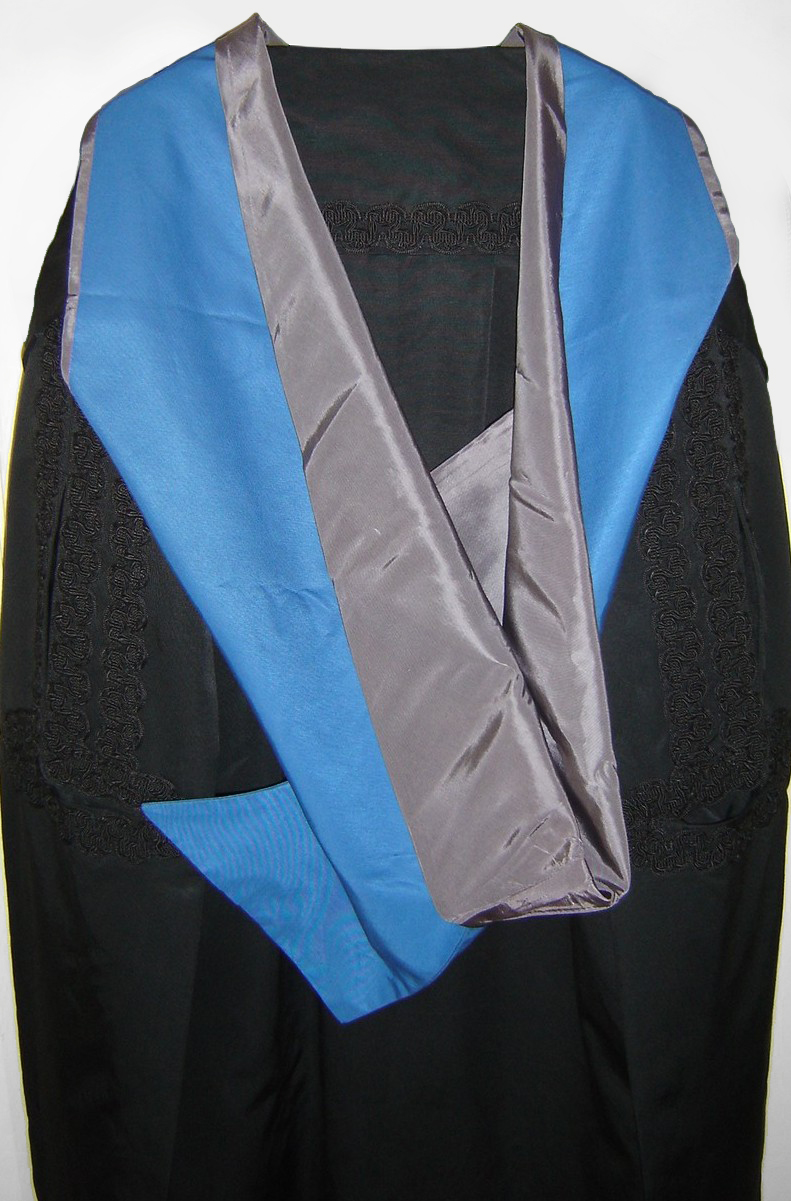
The MLitt/MSc hood

The BMus hood was originally of the same colour as the hoods for the other lay higher degrees (BCL, BM).

=== Other doctors', masters' and bachelors' degrees ===
The newer master's degrees follow with the silk gown of the lay higher faculties, and the following hoods:

- MBA – claret silk edged and lined with dark grey silk
- MSt – deep green silk edged and lined with white silk
- MEd (no longer awarded) – black silk edged and lined with green silk
- MTh – black silk edged and lined with magenta silk
- MFA – gold silk edged and lined white silk
- MPP – dark blue silk edged and lined with silver silk
- MEng, and other undergraduate masters (MBiochem, MChem, MCompSci, MEarthSci, MMath, MPhys and current and future equivalent joint-subject degrees) – black silk edged and lined with sand silk.

The newer bachelor's degrees follow with the stuff gown of the BA, and the following hoods:

- BFA – black silk with a narrow band of gold silk
- BEd (no longer awarded) – black silk with a narrow band of green silk
- BTh – black silk with a narrow band of magenta silk.

The academical dress of the new professional doctorates are:

- DClinPsychol – blue Burgon simple-shape lined red silk
- EngD – red Burgon shape lined petrol blue edged grey

There is no full dress gown for the professional doctorates so the doctor's undress gown is worn.

== University officials ==
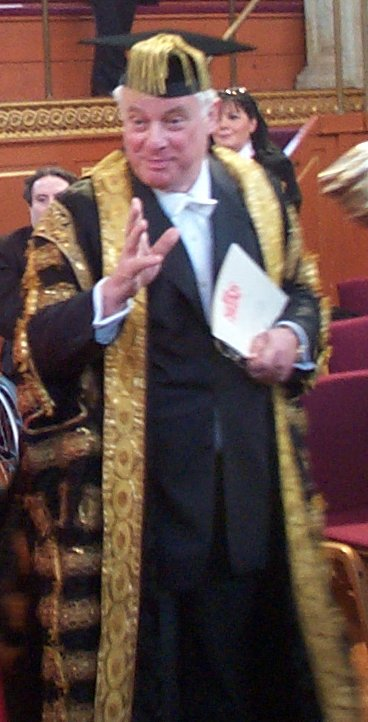
Chris Patten in the official gown of the Chancellor of Oxford

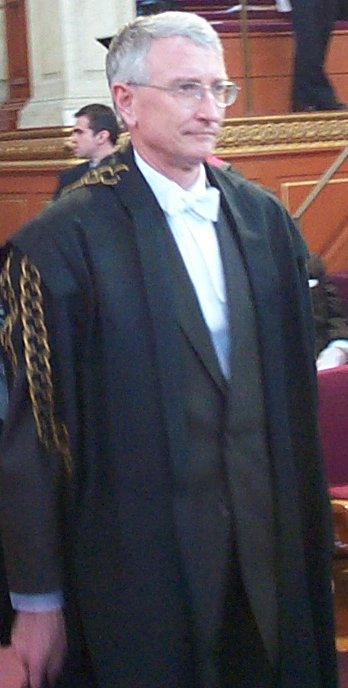
John Hood in his old Oxford Vice-Chancellor's undress gown

=== The chancellor ===
The chancellor of the university is elected for life by the Convocation (i.e. the alumni with degrees) of the university. He wears on ceremonial occasions a black silk lay-type gown with a long train, decorated with gold lace, similar to the gowns of the Lord Chancellor. The chancellor's mortarboard has a gold tassel, like that of the former noblemen commoners. In undress he wears the DCL dress or undress gown. In Oxford he always wears white tie and bands though in the past he wore a 'waterfall cravat' with court dress underneath his robes.

In 2015, a new robe was made for the chancellor in light of the original robes being over 100 years old and becoming fragile. This is similar to the new robe of the vice-chancellor save that the embroidery is on the facings rather than the sleeves. The rest of the robe has the gimp lace pentagons in the usual places.

=== The vice-chancellor ===
Previously vice-chancellors had no distinctive dress, but instead wore the black gown, convocation habit and hood if they were doctors or the MA gown and hood if they were not. When John Hood, a non-MA from outside the Congregation of the university, was appointed vice-chancellor in 2005, a new lay-type (undress) gown was designed for him, being black with simple gold trimming on the sleeves and flap collar.

An official/dress robe was commissioned in 2006. It is a lay-type gown with detachable panels on the lower sleeves of embroidered gold and silver laurel branches growing out of the university shield with the arms of the university's colleges seated on them. The back of the gown has a large university shield similarly trimmed with gold and silver laurel branches.

=== Proctors ===
The two proctors in Oxford are responsible for the discipline of junior members of the university. In addition they have various ceremonial and administrative roles.

In Oxford the proctors wear white tie and bands, and a black clerical-type gown of the doctors' full dress pattern with sleeves and facings of dark blue velvet (formerly black velvet). A hood fully lined with miniver is worn turned inside out so that only the fur is visible. This was formerly the full dress of the M.A. On both their proctorial and undress M.A. gowns they have a tippet, or small pouch, sewn to bottom-left of the yoke; this is kept for life on the MA gown even after their year in office.

Each proctor may appoint up to two pro-proctors, who may act in their stead throughout their year of office. The pro-proctors, when on duty, similarly wear sub-fusc, white tie and bands, and their own gown, which is a black clerical-type gown of the MA shape, with facings of black velvet and a tippet sewn to the bottom-left of the yoke. When performing proctorial roles pro-proctors wear the proctors' hood.

In both Oxford and Cambridge the proctors could formerly be seen patrolling the streets after dark with the university police, or bulldogs, who wore top hats in Cambridge and bowler hats in Oxford.

=== The assessor ===
Previously the assessor wore an MA gown with a tippet sewn onto the yoke. He or she now wears a proctor's dress gown with purple instead of blue velvet sleeves and facings. A button and tassel is sewn to the bottom-right of the yoke of their assessorial and undress M.A. gowns, which, as with the proctors' tippets, is kept for life on the MA gown. The assessor's hood is Burgon or Oxford simple-shape made of unlined white corded silk.

=== Bedels and the verger ===
The university bedels (or mace-bearers) and the university verger wear plain black lay-type gowns and Tudor bonnets, and white tie and bands.

=== Members of the chancellor's court of benefactors ===
Members of the court wear a gown in the shape of doctor's gown that is deep cherry in colour. There is a line of lace that runs across the collar, down the facings in addition to two lines around the sleeves. They wear a bonnet of deep cherry with a short tassel in the same colour.
