= Undergraduate Medicine and Health Sciences Admission Test =

Entrance exam for health science courses in Australia and New Zealand

The Undergraduate Medicine and Health Sciences Admission Test (UMAT /ˈjuːmæt/ YOO-mat) was a test previously administered by the Australian Council for Educational Research (ACER) in Australia and New Zealand to assist in the selection of domestic students for health science courses, including most medical (Bachelor of Medicine, Bachelor of Surgery) and dental degree programs, as well as other health science practical studies such as physiotherapy and optometry. The UMAT was used for domestic applicant selection into undergraduate courses only. Applicants for graduate medical education must take the Graduate Medical School Admissions Test, and foreign applicants must take the International Student Admissions Test. Each year, the UMAT was held on a single day in two sessions, morning and afternoon, typically in late July or early August at test centers in major cities in Australia and New Zealand, as well as a few other global cities.

The nature of the UMAT is different from typical high school examinations or university examinations. UMAT did not reliably predict academic performance in university medical programs. In addition, academic performance did not accurately predict whether the student would become a good doctor.

In 2019, the United Kingdom's University Clinical Aptitude Test (UCAT) replaced the UMAT.

== History ==
Before the introduction of the UMAT as a component of university entrance requirements, the sole criterion for entry into medical or health science degrees in Australian universities was final year high school (Year 12) results. In New Zealand, entry was following completion of the first year of a related degree, with applicants selected based on their GPA for that year. A consortium of universities found this criterion too restrictive, as it did not reflect all the qualities required to successfully study and practice medicine. Consequently, the UMAT was introduced to assess the qualities deemed by ACER and the UMAT Consortium universities to be important to the study and practice of medicine and the health sciences. These qualities include: critical thinking and problem solving, ability to understand people, and abstract non-verbal reasoning. The first use of the UMAT was in 1991 for applicants to The University of Newcastle for selection into their medical program.

== Format ==
As of 2013, the UMAT consists of three multiple choice sections over a total of three hours:

1. Logical reasoning and problem solving (48 questions)
2. Understanding people (44 questions)
3. Non-verbal reasoning (42 questions)

As of 2013 each of these sections, whether in part or in full, can be completed in any order over the duration of the three hours.

A candidate's UMAT score consists of three numbers, one raw score for each section of the test (this is not a percentage and the algorithms for their calculation have not been revealed by ACER), as well as a percentile ranking for each section. A final percentile and overall score (found usually by summing the three raw scores, but which can differ slightly due to each score's decimal places which are not shown on the candidate's statement of results) are given as part of the final results, and it is these final scores which are primarily used to determine the UMAT criteria for university admissions. For example, if a candidate was given the raw scores for Sections 1, 2, and 3 as 55, 60, 65 respectively, their overall score would be 179-181 and their percentile approximately 90.

As of 2012, all UMAT scores are valid for one year, this differs from the previous validity period of two years.

== Usage ==
The UMAT was an entry requirement for all UMAT Consortium universities, which constituted the vast majority of medical schools in Australia and New Zealand. Each university determined its own cut-off scores for UMAT results (based either on the "raw" section scores or section percentiles, depending on the university), obtained the results directly from ACER. Some universities, (for example, the University of Otago), also independently scaled each section of the UMAT in their selection process. In determining whether or not a candidate should be awarded a place, most universities also took into account a structured or semi-structured interview (such as a multiple mini interview) with the candidate, as well as Year 12 (Australia) or Year 13 (NCEA in New Zealand) results. Some universities, such as the University of Queensland, did not use interviews as part of the selection procedure.

== UMAT Consortium universities ==
The following universities were members of the UMAT Consortium:

- The University of Auckland
- The University of Adelaide
- Bond University
- Charles Darwin University
- Curtin University
- Flinders University
- La Trobe University
- Monash University
- The University of Newcastle/University of New England
- The University of New South Wales
- The University of Otago
- The University of Queensland
- The University of Tasmania
- The University of Western Australia
- The University of Western Sydney

== Controversy ==
Due to its inclusion as a mandatory admission requirement into medical and health science courses, as well as the highly competitive nature of entry into such courses, there has been some controversy regarding the UMAT's relevance, structure and necessity. ACER do not release their marking and scaling procedures. As well as this there are a number of different test booklets, with many of the questions uniquely appearing in one. From other tests administered by ACER (e.g. the Programme for International Student Assessment, PISA), it is known that ACER likes a simple version of item response theory presumed to correct for varying item difficulties. The accuracy of this scaling is, however, disputed.

== See also ==
- International Student Admissions Test (also created by ACER)
- GAMSAT (also created by ACER)
- List of admissions tests
