= Cambridge Assessment Admissions Testing =

Cambridge Assessment Admissions Testing (formerly the Admissions Testing Service) provided admissions tests for a range of university level courses and assessments in thinking skills and behavioural styles. It is part of Cambridge Assessment, a not-for-profit department of the University of Cambridge, England. It stopped delivering admissions tests at the end of 2023 and was disbanded in 2024.

== History ==
2001 - The Thinking Skills Assessment (TSA) was introduced for entry to a range of undergraduate courses at the University of Cambridge.

2003 - BioMedical Admissions Test (BMAT) introduced

2004 - a dedicated unit was formally set up within Cambridge Assessment, with responsibility for developing and administering admissions tests. The Thinking Skills Admissions Testing (TSAT) unit was responsible for administering the Thinking Skills Assessment (TSA) and the first BioMedical Admissions Test (BMAT).

2004 - interest in fair admissions to higher education was fuelled by a UK government funded review - "the Schwartz Report". This led to a collaboration between TSAT and the Australian Council for Educational Research (ACER) and the development of uniTEST. uniTEST explored if a single test could be used for admission to a broad range of courses and higher education institutions. uniTEST was introduced by some Australian universities, but there was relatively little demand in the UK.

2006 - the English Literature Admissions Test (ELAT) was introduced in the 2007–08 undergraduate admissions cycle for the Faculty of English at the University of Oxford.

2007 - In 2007, the University of Oxford introduces TSA as part of its admissions process for Philosophy, Politics and Economics (PPE)

2008 - University College London (UCL) introduces TSA as part of its admissions process for European and International Social and Political Studies (EISPS)

2011 onwards - administering the University of Oxford tests – starting with the History Aptitude Test (HAT) and the Physics Aptitude Test (PAT)

2016 onwards - assisting with the development and delivery of the University of Cambridge pre-interview assessments.

2011 - unit name changed from "Thinking Skills Admissions Testing" to "the Admissions Testing Service"

2017 - name changed to Cambridge Assessment Admissions Testing in January 2017, making clear it is part of Cambridge Assessment, a not-for-profit department of the University of Cambridge.

2021 - Cambridge Assessment merged with another non-teaching department of the same university, Cambridge University Press.

2022 - University College London (UCL) withdraws from using TSA and replaces it with an internal Thinking Skills Test (TST)

2023 - Cambridge Assessment Admissions Testing announces it will withdraw from running any admissions tests at the end of the year.

2024 - Cambridge Assessment Admissions Testing closes down its website and Support Site and ceases all operations.

== Research ==
Cambridge Assessment Admissions Testing conducted a broad programme of research to ensure the fairness and validity of its admissions tests for university admissions. It purpose is to gather evidence to demonstrate that the admissions tests make a useful contribution to the admissions process.

== Admissions tests ==
=== BioMedical Admissions Test (BMAT) ===
BMAT is used by universities in the UK and overseas for entry to Medicine, Biomedical Science and Dentistry courses.

=== International Medical Admissions Test (IMAT) ===
IMAT is used by a number of Italian universities for entry to English language-taught Medicine, Surgery and related degree courses. The test was developed in conjunction with the Italian Ministry of Education. It is currently taken in September for admission in October.

=== English Literature Admissions Test (ELAT) ===
ELAT is used for entry to English Literature courses at the University of Oxford and the University of Cambridge. It is taken in late October/early November for admission the following October.

=== Sixth Term Examination Paper (STEP) ===
STEP is used for entry to Mathematics courses at the University of Cambridge and the University of Warwick. It is used by the University of Cambridge as the basis for conditional offers, and is taken in June for admission in October. Other UK universities may take STEP results into account when making offers for their Mathematics courses.

=== Test of Mathematics for University Admission (TMUA) ===
The Test of Mathematics for University Admission is a test of mathematical thinking and reasoning. It is assessed through two 75 minute multiple-choice papers. It is taken in November, and is used as the basis for conditional offers. Durham University, Lancaster University, the University of Warwick, the University of Sheffield and the University of Southampton encourage applicants to their Mathematics courses to take the test.

=== Other admissions tests delivered on behalf of universities ===
==== The University of Cambridge ====
Cambridge Assessment Admissions Testing delivers pre-interview assessments for the following University of Cambridge courses:

- Anglo-Saxon, Norse, and Celtic (ASNCAA)
- Asian and Middle Eastern Studies (AMESAA)
- Economics (ECAA)
- Engineering (ENGAA)
- Geography (GAA)
- History (HAA)
- Human, Social, and Political Sciences (HSPSAA)
- Natural Sciences (NSAA)
- Psychological and Behavioural Sciences (PBSAA).

==== The University of Oxford ====
Cambridge Assessment Admissions Testing administers the following admissions tests for the University of Oxford:

- Classics Admissions Test (CAT)
- History Aptitude Test (HAT)
- Mathematics Admissions Test (MAT) (Imperial College London also uses MAT for its undergraduate degree courses in Mathematics)
- Modern Languages Admissions Tests (MLAT)
- Oriental Languages Aptitude Test (OLAT)
- Philosophy Test
- Physics Aptitude Test (PAT).

== Thinking Skills Assessment (TSA) ==
TSA is used for entry to a wide range of undergraduate university courses, including: Economics and Management, Engineering, Land Economy, Human Sciences, Philosophy, Politics and Economics (PPE), Psychology and Philosophy. It assesses whether applicants have the critical thinking and problem-solving skills which universities consider to be essential for success in higher education. In the UK, it is used by the University of Cambridge, University of Oxford and University College London (UCL). It is also used by Stockholm School of Economics, Sweden and Universiti Teknologi PETRONAS (UTP), Malaysia.

The TSA exam is scored on a scale from 0 to 100 using the "Rasch Model".

== Behavioural styles assessment ==
Cambridge Personal Styles Questionnaire (CPSQ) assess behavioural styles - how people approach tasks and interact with others. This includes thinking and learning, motivation, self-management, resilience and interpersonal values and attitudes. It is used in healthcare education and employment and in higher education and schools. The assessment was developed over four years of research and trialling with general and vocational higher education (including medicine, nursing and healthcare institutions).

== See also ==
- BioMedical Admissions Test (BMAT)
- International Medical Admissions Test (IMAT)
- English Literature Admissions Test (ELAT)
- Sixth Term Examination Paper (STEP)
- Thinking Skills Assessment (TSA)
- Cambridge Assessment
- Cambridge University Press & Assessment
