= International Student Admissions Test =

University admissions test

The International Student Admissions Test (ISAT) is a mandatory test for entry into medicine, dentistry and other healthcare related courses offered by some Australian educational institutions to international students.

== Overview ==
The test is produced by the Australian Council for Educational Research (ACER) in order to give an indication of cognitive abilities of international students who have applied for entry into an Australian university.

The 3 hour computer-based exam comprises 100 multiple choice questions designed to assess each candidates critical reasoning and quantitative reasoning skills.

During the COVID-19 pandemic, the exam continues to be administered both in Prometric-run exam centres and also, remotely at home depending on the country you are sitting from.
