= Stephen Siklos =

British mathematician (1950–2019)

Stephen Theodore Chesmer Siklos (27 March 1950 – 17 August 2019) was a British mathematician, astrophysicist and university administrator. For his doctorate, he undertook research into general relativity under Stephen Hawking. After completing two postdoctoral positions, he spent the remainder of his career at the University of Cambridge. He was at various times a lecturer in the Faculty of Mathematics, Director of Studies for Mathematics at Newnham College and Jesus College and Senior Tutor at Jesus College. He is best known for his work in setting up and administering the Sixth Term Examination Papers, used for undergraduate mathematics admissions at several British universities.

== Early life and education ==
Siklos was born in Epsom, Surrey, England in 1950, the son of Theodore Siklos, the first principal of Crawley College of Further Education, and Ruth Siklos (née Purser), an almoner. He was educated at Collyer's School in Horsham before reading for the Mathematical Tripos at Pembroke College, Cambridge, where he obtained a distinction in Part III and was also awarded the Tyson Medal. He then spent a year teaching at Dulwich College, London.

== Academic career ==
In 1973, he began a PhD into general relativity, supervised by Stephen Hawking. In 1976, his dissertation, entitled "Singularities, Invariants and Cosmology", led to a long-term interest in schemes for assessing the relative generality of solutions of Einstein's equations and to the study of what are now known as Siklos invariants, Siklos universes and Siklos waves.

Following his dissertation, his two PhD examiners hired him successively for postdoctoral posts, first Dennis Sciama at the Department of Astrophysics at Oxford, and then from 1978 Malcolm MacCallum at Queen Mary College (now Queen Mary University of London).

Following these posts, he spent the rest of his career at Cambridge. From 1980 to 1999 he was a lecturer and later Director of Studies in Mathematics at Newnham College, and from 1991 held a part-time university lectureship in the Department of Applied Mathematics and Theoretical Physics (DAMTP). In 1999, he became a fellow of Jesus College. In the same year he was awarded the Pilkington Teaching Prize for the "outstanding quality" of his teaching. He served as the college's Director of Studies in Mathematics, and later as its Senior Tutor. In 2017 and 2018 he was its President, the highest college office below that of Master.

During his time at DAMTP, he served as Chair of the Teaching Committee, Faculty Admissions Officer and Mathematics Subject Convenor for the Admissions Forum. He is credited with successfully guiding the faculty through the national Teaching Assessment Exercise and the subsequent changes to the undergraduate Tripos.

=== STEP ===
In 1987, Siklos played a central role in setting up the Sixth Term Examination Papers (STEP), a series of examinations taken by candidates for admission to mathematics courses at Cambridge and other universities regardless of their previous mathematical training. He led the project for 32 years during which he steered STEP through major changes in schools' mathematics curricula. He was involved in every stage of the examination process, including drafting questions, scrutinising the final papers and directing the marking and grading. Seen as "the public face of STEP", he gave talks about the project at faculty open days, led the faculty's long-running STEP Easter School and established its STEP support programme. Writing in The Guardian, James Clackson said that Siklos "did more than anyone to make the Cambridge entrance examination in mathematics accessible to students whatever their school background".

== Publications ==
- Gibbons, G.W.; Hawking, S.W.; Siklos, S.T.C., eds. (1983). The very early Universe (reprint ed.). Cambridge University Press. ISBN 978-0521316774. The proceedings of the Nuffield Workshop on the Very Early Universe which took place in DAMTP in the summer of 1982.
- Siklos, S (1990). Philippa Fawcett and the Mathematical Tripos. Cambridge: Newnham College. Written to mark the centenary of Philippa Fawcett becoming the first woman to obtain the top score in the Cambridge Mathematical Tripos.
- Siklos, Stephen (2019). Advanced Problems in Mathematics: Preparing for University (2nd ed.). Open Book Publishers. ISBN 978-1-78374-776-4. A guide for STEP candidates, aimed at equipping students to take STEP even if their school could not provide the necessary support or guidance. The book contains selected past questions, with each question being accompanied by a comment and a full solution. This 2019 edition is a revised and extended version of two earlier editions by Siklos. It is available in PDF format to STEP candidates free of charge.

== Personal life and death ==
His extracurricular interests included music (he played the violin and viola), bridge and tennis.

Stephen Siklos died from cancer in 2019. He was survived by his wife, Professor Marian Holness, their two sons Arthur and Edward, by the children from his first marriage to Catherine (née Marshall), Tabitha and Jonathan, and his brother Paul.
