= Asia World Schools Debating Championship =

Annual international debate competition

- Abbreviation: AWSDC
- Founded: 2013
- Founder: World Schools Debate Championship (WSDC) Asia steering committee
- Purpose: World Schools Debating Championships
- Location: Bangkok, Thailand
- Website: Official Facebook Page

Asia World Schools Debating Championship, commonly coined as AWSDC, is an international debate competition founded by the World Schools Debate Championship's Asia steering committee in 2013. The 1st Asia World Schools Debating Championship was held from 1–8 August 2013 at Anglo Singapore International School's Campus in Sukhumvit 64, Bangkok, Thailand including 7 preliminary rounds, and single elimination playoffs thereafter. The tournament was centered on the theme, "Youth Activism: It's Our Turn". 100 teams from all over the world participated; including the national teams of New Zealand, Australia, Thailand, Taiwan, Singapore, Malaysia, China, Philippines, Korea, Sri Lanka, Bangladesh and South Africa. The team from Anglo Chinese Junior College (Singapore) emerged as the tournament's first champions, going undefeated in all of its 11 matches.

The 2nd AWSDC was held once again in Bangkok, Thailand from 31 July- 4 August 2014 at Anglo Singapore International School. It is the official pre-tournament of World Schools Debating Championships (WSDC) Thailand 2014.

== Tournament Format ==
AWSDC adapts the World Schools Style debate format which is a combination of the British Parliamentary and Australia-Asian formats. All debates are carried out in English only. Each team consists of 3-5 debaters who each make 8-minute speeches either as side proposition or side opposition for or against a motion respectively. AWSDC emphasizes world-class debates and adjudicating in order to provide a platform for young student debaters to improve and achieve their full potential. It also encourages friendly competition where young debaters not only gain academic knowledge but also build friendships with people of diverse backgrounds.

== Adjudication Core ==
AWSDC	Adjudication Core					
2013	Co-Chief Adjudicator: Kip Oebanda (Philippines)	Co-Chief Adjudicator: Usjima Vittayaamnuaykoon (Thailand)	Deputy Chief Adjudicator: Iris Hui Zhang (Hong Kong)	Deputy Chief Adjudicator: Syed Saddiq (Malaysia)		
2014	Co-Chief Adjudicator: Gemma Buckley (Australia)	Co-Chief Adjudicator: Wen-Yu Weng (United Kingdom & Thailand)	Deputy Chief Adjudicator: Ashish Kumar	Deputy Chief Adjudicator: Mai Mokhsein		
2016	Co-Chief Adjudicator: Lucas Li (Singapore)	Co-Chief Adjudicator: Jazlina Sutanto (Thailand)	Co-Chief Adjudicator: Jainah binti Jaafar Sidek (Malaysia)	Co-Chief Adjudicator: Leomar Jose N. Doctolero Jr (Philippines)	Co-Chief Adjudicator: Josh Jeong (South Korea)	
2017	Co-Chief Adjudicator: Kip Oebanda (Philippines)	Co-Chief Adjudicator: Harish Natarajan (United Kingdom)	Co-Chief Adjudicator: Tamara Fernando (Sri Lanka)	Co-Chief Adjudicator: Jazlina Sutanto (Thailand)		
2019	Co-Chief Adjudicator: Joshua Park (Korea)	Co-Chief Adjudicator: Ameera Natasha Moore (Malaysia)	Co-Chief Adjudicator: Lucia Arce (Mexico/United Kingdom)	Co-Chief Adjudicator: Brian Wong (Hong Kong)	Co-Chief Adjudicator: George Chen (China)	Co-Chief Adjudicator: Yoni Cohen-Idov (Israel)
2023	Co-Chief Adjudicator: Benjamin Goh (Singapore))	Co-Chief Adjudicator: Huw Jones (Wales)	Deputy Chief Adjudicator: Geneva Roy (New Zealand)	Deputy Chief Adjudicator: Joshua Park (Korea)	Deputy Chief Adjudicator: Ruth Selorme Acolatse (Turkey)	

== Tournaments ==
Series	Dates	Grand Finals Venue
1st AWSDC	1 - 8 August 2013	Anglo-Singapore International School
2nd AWSDC	1 - 4 August 2014	Novotel
3rd AWSDC	6 - 10 July 2016	Novotel
4th AWSDC	24 - 28 July 2017	Queen Sirikit Convention Centre
5th AWSDC	15 - 20 July 2019	Queen Sirikit Convention Centre
6th AWSDC	10 - 15 July 2023	Novotel
7th AWSDC	29 June - 3 July 2025	Anglo-Singapore International School

== Winners ==
Tournament Year	Winner	Runner-up	Tournament Best Speaker	Novice Champion
2013	Anglo-Chinese Junior College(Singapore)	Team South Africa (South Africa)	Annette Yeo	~
2014	Team Malaysia(Malaysia)	Team South Africa (South Africa)	Samuel Wittberger	~
2016	Team India (India)	Team Singapore Development Squad (Singapore)	Sampada Sudheesh Venkatesh	Royal College (Sri Lanka)
2017	Team Peru A (Peru)	Team Philippines (Philippines)	Rafael Shimabukuro	Team India Development Squad
2019	Team China (China)	Team Malaysia (Malaysia)	Brian Li	Team Bangladesh
2023	Team China (China)	Team India (India)	Teioh Nuan Ning	WSDC Thailand Development Team
2025	Team Malaysia (Malaysia)	Team Pakistan (Pakistan)	Teresa Chen	Team Kenya WSDC Development C
