= University of Cambridge Local Examinations Syndicate =

Non-teaching department

- Abbreviation: Cambridge Assessment; UCLES
- Successor: Cambridge University Press and Assessment
- Formation: 1858
- Type: inactive, merged
- Legal status: Department of the University of Cambridge
- Headquarters: The Triangle Building, Cambridge, UK
- Services: Examinations and academic assessments
- CEO: Peter Andrew Jestyn Phillips
- Key people: Stephen Toope
- Parent organization: Cambridge University Press & Assessment
- Subsidiaries: Cambridge Assessment International Education; Cambridge Assessment Admissions Testing; Cambridge Assessment English; Oxford, Cambridge and RSA Examinations
- Employees: (2019)
- Website: cambridgeassessment.org.uk

The University of Cambridge Local Examinations Syndicate (UCLES), branded as Cambridge Assessment, was a non-teaching department of the University of Cambridge. It merged with Cambridge University Press to form Cambridge University Press and Assessment under Queen Elizabeth II's approval in August 2021.

Cambridge Assessment provides educational assessments, which include the Cambridge OCR examination board, Cambridge Assessment International Education, Cambridge Assessment Admissions Testing, and Cambridge Assessment English for learners of the English language.

Cambridge Assessment is not responsible for internal examinations at the University of Cambridge other than admissions tests.

Cambridge Assessment is based at Triangle Building in Cambridge.

== Products and services ==
Cambridge Assessment has four examination boards offering a range of assessments and a research division:

- Cambridge Assessment's research division carries out research that underpins all Cambridge Assessment qualifications and programmes, such as expanding e-assessment. This included the Cambridge Psychometrics Centre, until its move to the University of Cambridge.
- OCR is one of the UK's many awarding bodies. OCR offers GCSEs, A levels and a wide range of vocational qualifications to learners of all ages in schools, colleges and other institutions within the United Kingdom.
- Cambridge International Education (formerly known as Cambridge Assessment International Education) provides assessment services to many governments and supplies International GCSEs, A and AS levels and business qualifications, primarily outside the United Kingdom.
- Cambridge Assessment English (formerly known as Cambridge English Language Assessment) operates in 135 countries worldwide. Each year over 4 million people take a Cambridge Assessment English qualification.
- Cambridge Assessment Admissions Testing which provides admissions testing for universities including the University of Cambridge.
- Cambridge Assessment Network provides professional development to the assessment community.

It is one of Europe's largest assessment agencies, with over eight million learners in over 170 countries and marked by over 30,000 examiners every year and over 30,000 people work with Cambridge Assessment by either attending conferences or by taking part in topical debates from their desktop. It is recognised by governments around the world.

== History ==
UCLES was established in 1858 to administer examinations for persons who were not members of the University of Cambridge and to inspect schools, with the aim of raising standards in education. The Syndicate began examining in territories overseas, with the first held in Trinidad in 1864. At the beginning of the 20th century, the Syndicate was empowered to hold examinations for commercial certificates.

The Certificate of Proficiency in English (known as the CPE), the Syndicate's first examination in the field of English as a foreign language, was introduced by UCLES to deliver proof of language proficiency to native speakers of languages other than English. Over the years, UCLES adopted further English language examinations, the First Certificate in English (FCE) and the Certificate in Advanced English (CAE). On the CEFR (Common European Framework of Reference for Languages) ranging from A1/A2 (lower level), B1/B2 (intermediate level) to C1/C2 (advanced level), the FCE is set at B2, the CAE at C1 and the CPE at C2.

The universities of Oxford and Cambridge created the Oxford and Cambridge Schools Examination Board which became part of UCLES. The UCLES Group absorbed several other examination boards, including the Southern Universities Joint Board, the Midland Examining Group and the RSA Examinations and Assessment Foundation.

Cambridge Assessment's research division was set up in 1994.

The Thinking Skills Assessment (TSA) was introduced in 2001 for entry to a range of undergraduate courses at the University of Cambridge followed by the first BioMedical Admissions Test (BMAT) in 2003. In 2004, a dedicated unit was formally set up with responsibility for developing and administering admissions tests.

Cambridge Assessment celebrated its 150th anniversary in 2008. Cambridge Assessment called for "league tables [to be] taken out of [government] ministers' hands", because it felt recent reforms of the British education system had disfavoured International GCSEs offered by its Cambridge Assessment International subsidiary.

Cambridge Maths was launched in 2014 to improve maths teaching – a four-way partnership between Cambridge Assessment, the University of Cambridge Faculty of Mathematics and its Faculty of Education.

It launched the Cambridge Partnership for Education in 2020 with Cambridge University Press and the University of Cambridge.

It moved to a purpose-built building in 2018, on part of Cambridge University Press's site in Cambridge. The building was designed by Eric Parry Architects, and construction began in 2015 with landscaping by Coles Nursery and architectural elements such as pebble seat sculptures. The building won an award in 2019 from the British Council for Offices for good corporate workplaces.

In 2021, Cambridge Assessment merged with Cambridge University Press. The new organisation is called Cambridge University Press & Assessment.
