= University Clinical Aptitude Test =

Admissions test for medical and dental programmes

- Acronym: UCAT
- Type: Multiple choice
- Administrator: Pearson
- Year started: 2006
- Duration: 2 hours
- Score range: 900–2700 and Bands 1–4
- Score validity: For admission to Consortium universities in the year following the test
- Offered: Early July–late September for UCAT UK and early July–early August for UCAT ANZ
- Restrictions on attempts: Once per cycle
- Languages: English
- Annual number of test takers: ▲42,359 (UK 2026); ▲17,341 (ANZ 2026)
- Website: www.ucat.ac.uk

The University Clinical Aptitude Test (UCAT) is an admissions test used by most medical and dental schools in the United Kingdom, Singapore, Australia and New Zealand in their applicant selection processes. Launched in 2006 as the UK Clinical Aptitude Test (UKCAT), it was renamed in 2019 following the launch of the test in Australia and New Zealand as a replacement for the Undergraduate Medicine and Health Sciences Admission Test (UMAT).

In the UK, the UCAT was one of two main admissions tests used for medical, dental and other health-related courses, the other being the BioMedical Admissions Test (BMAT). Following the BMAT's cancellation from 2024 onwards, all ex-BMAT universities have moved to using the UCAT for their undergraduate medical courses, including Oxford and Cambridge.

In 2026, the UK version of the test had 42,359 test takers whilst the ANZ version had 17,341.

The variant used for entry into undergraduate medicine, dentistry and clinical science in Australia and New Zealand is known as UCAT ANZ.

== Format ==
The UCAT is designed to be a test of aptitude and attitude, not academic achievement. The test's rationale is that the latter is already demonstrated by A-Levels, Scottish Highers, ATAR, or undergraduate degrees. It thus attempts to assess a certain range of mental abilities and behavioural attributes identified as useful. These mental abilities include critical thinking, logical reasoning, and inference.

The UCAT consists of four subtests, including three cognitive tests and one testing professional demeanour. Each test has a time allocation as below:

- Verbal Reasoning – assesses candidates' ability to think logically about written information and arrive at a reasoned conclusion. The candidate is given 22 minutes, with 11 passages to read and 44 questions to answer in that time.
- Decision Making – assesses the ability to apply logic to reach a decision or conclusion, evaluate arguments and analyse statistical information. Question types include syllogisms, logic puzzles, interpreting Venn diagrams and calculating probabilities. The candidate is allocated 37 minutes to answer 35 items associated with text, charts, tables, graphs or diagrams.
- Quantitative Reasoning – assesses candidates' ability to solve numerical problems. The candidate is given 26 minutes to answer 36 questions associated with tables, charts, graphs etc. as information.

The situational judgement test is a different type of test from the tests above:

- Situational Judgement – measures candidates' responses in situations and their grasp of medical ethics and capacity to understand real world situations. This section of the test is 26 minutes long, with 69 questions associated with 22 scenarios.

The test is a computer-based, online test taken at a Pearson VUE centre near the candidate. Candidates are not allowed to bring external materials in to the exam. A basic calculator is provided on the screen, along with a laminated notebook and an erasable marker pen for taking notes. Most exam centres also provide earplugs, or if not, candidates can supply their own. The equipment and conditions vary slightly between different test centers. 1 minute and 30 seconds of time is given between each subtest except Quantitative Reasoning, which has 2 minutes.

Including time to read instructions before each subtest, the test lasts a maximum of 2 hours (or 2.5 hours for the UCATSEN version of the test). Each of the UCAT subtests are in a multiple-choice format and are separately timed. There is also 2 minutes of warm-up time (to read general instructions on the whole exam) at the start.

The test must be sat between July and September of 2024 by candidates who want to apply to member universities for entry in 2025 (or deferred entry in 2026).

The test's format underwent significant changes after the 2024 test cycle for the 2025 test cycle and beyond. These included slight timing adjustments, an increase in the number of questions in the Decision Making subtest, and most importantly, the removal of the Abstract Reasoning subtest. This subtest assessed candidates' ability to infer relationships from information (normally shapes) by convergent and divergent thinking, using questions such as Bongard problems. The UCAT Consortium cited historical data that candidate performance has increased and response times have decreased, indicating the subtest's "high coachability". Particularly, 90th percentile for the subtest increased from 820 to 880. The UCAT UK Consortium offered additional reasoning, with their analysis showing that the subtest has "lower predictive validity [for candidate performance in university] than the other sections", citing several studies.

== Content and preparation ==
There is no curriculum content, as the test is designed to probe innate skills. These include basic arithmetic, reading comprehension and logical reasoning, along with character, and personal and social attitudes.

Past papers are not available. There are however question banks and fully timed practice tests on the UCAT website. The UCAT Consortium recommends that candidates prepare for the test, and provide extensive free materials on their site to assist. Due to the recent changes to test format, new preparation materials will be released on 1st March 2025.

== Scoring and results ==
Each of the first three subsections (Verbal Reasoning, Decision Making and Quantitative Reasoning) are scored in a range of 300–900. The Situational Judgement Test is scored with bands 1–4, in the UK version, and 300–900, in the ANZ version. Although ANZ candidates are given a numerical score for the SJT, conversions are available to convert these scores into bands for any prospective UCAT UK consortium university applicant. The Decision Making and Situational Judgement subtests also employ partial marking for partially correct responses or responses "close to the correct answer" for each subtest respectively.

Unlike the BMAT or UMAT, UCAT test takers are informed of their UCAT result immediately after sitting their test, and well in advance of any application deadlines, allowing them to consider this when selecting which universities to apply to. Universities use UCAT results in different ways during their admissions processes, but should all provide information on their websites regarding how they use the UCAT in selection.

For some universities, the UCAT score is a significant factor in their consideration of applications (used as the sole decider for interview invites). For others, it may be a less significant factor or only used in marginal situations, such as a secondary ranking after academic results. Most universities consider total score (i.e. the score after each of the cognitive subtest scores have been added together), while some look at individual subtest scores and may even have a cut-off score or apply different weightings for a particular subtest.

== Widening participation ==
The UCAT Consortium offers a bursary scheme to cover the full test fee to UK and EU candidates in financial need who meet a set eligibility criteria, and a concession scheme that offers a reduced fee for Australian candidates on a current Australian Health Care Card (HCC) or Pensioner Concession Card (PCC).

Both UCAT UK and ANZ also offer access arrangements for candidates with learning difficulties, physical disabilities, sensory impairment (visual, hearing or multi-sensory) or medical conditions (such as ADHD or ASD). These arrangements include allowing candidates to take the test in a separate room or bring in otherwise unauthorised materials for medical reasons (e.g. medicine, medical devices, mobility devices, food and drinks). The UCAT Consortiums also offer several versions of the standard test that provide rest breaks (indicated by the suffix SA) and/or additional time in each subtest (indicated by the suffix SEN).

== Usefulness and controversies ==
The UCAT Consortium specifies, "Every university uses the UCAT result as part of a well-rounded admissions policy in which several other factors also carry considerable weight." UCAT has been shown to have some independent predictive validity of performance at medical school, but considerably less than A-levels.

There is some evidence from Australia that women and people from more rural areas or of lower socio‐economic status perform less well on the UCAT, and this appears to be to a greater extent than with the UMAT exam that it replaced in Australia.

A summary of relevant published work since 2009 is available on the Published Research page of the UCAT website.

== Participating universities ==
As of 2025, the UCAT is used for admission into the medical, dental and/or oral health courses at the following universities:

=== Australia ===
- Adelaide University
- Central Queensland University
- Charles Sturt University
- Curtin University
- Flinders University / Charles Darwin University
- Griffith University
- Monash University
- University of Newcastle / University of New England Joint Medical Program
- University of New South Wales
- University of Queensland
- University of Southern Queensland
- University of the Sunshine Coast
- University of Tasmania
- University of Western Australia
- Western Sydney University

=== New Zealand ===
- University of Auckland
- University of Otago

=== Singapore ===
- Lee Kong Chian School of Medicine

=== United Kingdom ===
- University of Aberdeen
- Anglia Ruskin University
- Aston University
- Bangor University
- University of Birmingham
- Brighton and Sussex Medical School
- University of Bristol
- Brunel University London
- University College London
- University of Cambridge
- Cardiff University
- University of Lancashire
- University of Chester
- University of Dundee
- University of East Anglia
- Edge Hill University
- University of Edinburgh
- University of Exeter
- University of Glasgow
- Hull York Medical School
- Imperial College London
- Keele University
- Kent and Medway Medical School
- King's College London
- Lancaster University
- University of Leeds
- University of Leicester
- University of Liverpool
- University of Manchester
- Newcastle University
- University of Nottingham
- University of Oxford
- Pears Cumbria School of Medicine
- University of Lincoln
- Plymouth University
- Queen Mary University of London
- Queen's University Belfast
- University of Sheffield
- University of Southampton
- University of St Andrews
- St George's, University of London
- University of Sunderland
- University of Surrey (Graduate Entry)
- Swansea University (Graduate Entry)
- University of Warwick (Graduate Entry)
- University of Worcester (Graduate Entry)

== See also ==
- BioMedical Admissions Test (BMAT)
- Graduate Medical School Admissions Test (GAMSAT)
