= Lisa Rodgers =

Lisa Rodgers, PSM, is a senior educational administrator who has held executive roles in Australia and New Zealand, including as Director General of the Department of Education in Western Australia, CEO of the Australian Institute for Teaching and School Leadership (AITSL) and CEO of the Australian Council for Educational Research.

== Education ==
Rodgers holds an Honours Degree in Psychology. Her early career included roles in psychology, specialising in child mental health, and intelligence work in the British Army. Her army experience proved particularly useful during the COVID-19 pandemic, when she set up an Incident Management Unit in the WA Department of Education and managed numerous policy changes

== Career ==
Rodgers has spent most of her career in the public sector. She has been director general of the Department of Education in Western Australia since January 2019 Before this role, she served as the chief executive officer of the Australian Institute for Teaching and School Leadership for Educational Research and held various senior roles in the Ministry of Education in New Zealand, including deputy secretary of early learning and student achievement.

Rodgers served as a board director on The Foundation for Young Australians in 2019-2020. She is committed to improving educational outcomes for young people and effective leadership in schools Through her career, Rodgers has led reforms in assessment innovation, curriculum development, and the use of evidence for impact at both the classroom and national levels. In September 2024, Rodgers commenced as CEO of the Australian Council for Educational Research.

== Honours ==
Her contributions to education have been recognised with several awards, including the Public Service Medal (PSM) as a part of the King's Birthday 2024 Honours, the Australian Council for Educational Leaders Western Australian Pre Eminent Educational Leader Award in 2021, and the Australian Council of Educational Leaders Fellowship in 2023.
