= Yoni Cohen-Idov =

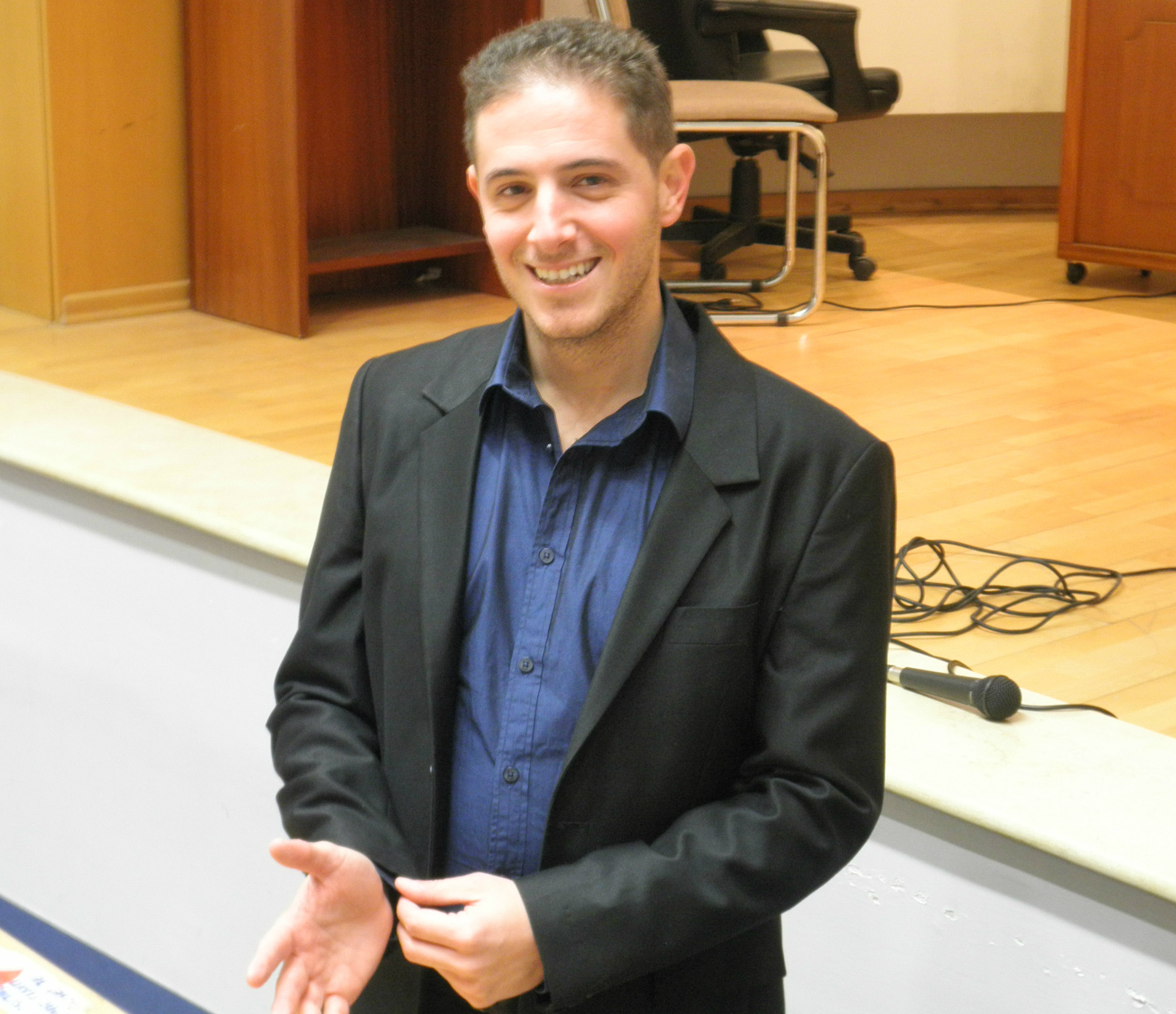
Yoni Cohen-Idov

Yoni Cohen-Idov (Hebrew: יוני כהן-אידוב; born May 31, 1980) is an Israeli-American debater, journalist, speaker and consultant.

Cohen-Idov was the 2010 World Universities Debating Champion in the English as a Second Language (ESL) category, the 2009 European Universities Debating Championships Runner-Up (Open Break) and Top ESL Speaker. Cohen-Idov was Head Debate Coach for Tel Aviv University and Hebrew University, as well as for the Israeli schools debating team.

In 2010 Cohen-Idov spearheaded a national initiative to promote debate education in Israel's public schools, in collaboration with the ministry of education and the Center of Citizens Empowerment in Israel. The program aimed to promote critical thinking, civil discourse, tolerance and understanding in the country. As of 2015, the program reached 200 schools. Cohen-Idov has served as the program's director (a volunteer position) since its inception.

Since 2012, Cohen-Idov has taught, trained and consulted organizations and individuals on message conveyance, adapting his debate-based methods to the business and public spheres. Cohen-Idov has worked with some notable Israeli and American politicians, as well as business figures and organizations.

Cohen-Idov is the founder of the YCI Center for Debate and Rhetoric.

== Biography ==
=== Debating career ===
Cohen-Idov started debating at 13. At 16 he was captain of the Israeli national schools debate team, which ranked sixth at the World Schools Debating Championship in Australia in 1996.

In 2007 Cohen-Idov joined the Tel Aviv University Debating Society, and in 2008 and 2009 won back-to-back Best Speaker awards at the Israeli national debating championship.

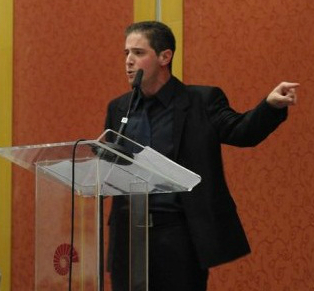
Yoni Cohen-Idov in WUDC 2010 Finals

In the 2009 European Universities Debating Championship, Cohen-Idov and his partner, Uri Merhav, became the second ESL team in EUDC history to qualify into the main category's grand-finals, traditionally the turf of native English-speaking teams. The grand-finals featured three teams from Oxford University in addition to the Tel Aviv team, which made the Israeli duo the crowd's favorite. Cohen-Idov also won the ESL Top Speaker award. Cohen-Idov and Merhav went on to win the ESL title in the World Universities Debating Championship the following year.

Between 2008 and 2012 Cohen-Idov served as Head-Coach for the national Israeli schools debating team.

In 2010, Team Israel with Cohen-Idov as coach was the first ever Israeli side in any sport to compete in Doha, Qatar, where they ranked 9th overall in that year's WSDC.

In 2011 Cohen-Idov was named Chairman of Siah Vasig - The Israel Debate Society, a non-profit organization. He also founded the YCI Center for Debate and Rhetoric.

As of 2021, Cohen-Idov works as a coach for LearningLeaders, a public speaking and debate organization located in Shanghai, China.

=== Notable achievements ===
As a Debater:

- 2019 - World Universities Debating Championship - Cape Town, South Africa - Champion (Masters Final)
- 2010 - World Universities Debating Championship - Antalya, Turkey - Champion (ESL)
- 2009 - European Universities Debating Championship - Newcastle, England - Runner-Up (Main Break)
- 2009 - European Universities Debating Championship - Newcastle, England – Best Speaker (ESL)
- 2008, 2009 - Israeli National Debating Championship– Best Speaker

As a coach:

- 2025 - NSDA (USA) National Champions - Team China Gold by Dialogy
- 2017 - European Champions (Open Break), World Champions (ESL) - Tel Aviv University
- 2015 - European Champions (ESL) - Tel Aviv University)
- 2012- World Universities Debating Championship – Champions (ESL) and Best 2 Speakers (ESL) – Tel Aviv University
- 2011- European Universities Debating Championship – Champions (ESL) and Best 2 Speakers (ESL) - Tel Aviv University
- 2012 - Israeli National Debating Championship – Champions and Best Speaker - Tel Aviv University
- 2008 - World Schools Debating Championship – Washington DC, USA - 6th place – Team Israel
- 2010 - World Schools Debating Championship – 9th place – Team Israel
