= Past paper =

Examination paper from a previous exam session

A past paper is an examination paper from a previous year or previous years, usually used either for exam practice or for tests such as University of Oxford, University of Cambridge College Collections.

Exam candidates find past papers valuable in test preparation. Some organizations responsible for holding exams have made past exam papers commercially available by either publishing the papers by themselves or licensing a publisher to do the same. For example, UPSC papers in India, SAT papers in U.S. and GCSE and A level papers in UK are being sold, as well as other exams worldwide.

Previous year question (PYQ) papers are to assess student's brilliancy and capabilities. Students who are preparing for competition exams generally look for past papers. These question papers will help you to have an idea about the main exam. Students typically find these past papers, as private websites reveal more information than the official websites. https://pakboardresults.com/

Many countries such as Singapore publish past examination papers from various sources and publishers such as MOE, SEAB and Education Publishing House (EPH), where many students found it extremely beneficial and useful as many exam-styled questions that are asked in past examination papers are often repeated in the future examination papers, except for wording. Furthermore, these past examination papers are useful for students to prepare for national examinations such as PSLE, N Level, O Level and A Level. Before the EPH could publish past examination papers in the form of books, the publisher must first seek permission from SEAB and MOE, as failure to do so may result in copyright infringement.
