= Singapore Medical Journal =

Medical journal

- Discipline: Medicine
- Language: English
- Edited by: Poh Kian Keong

Publication details
- History: 1960–present
- Publisher: Medknow Publications on behalf of the Singapore Medical Association (Singapore)
- Frequency: Monthly
- Impact factor: 3.331 (2021)

Standard abbreviations
- ISO 4: Singap. Med. J.
- NLM: Singapore Med J

Indexing
- CODEN: SIMJA3
- ISSN: 0037-5675 (print); 2737-5935 (web)
- OCLC no.: 819006248

Links
- Journal homepage; Online access; Online archive

The Singapore Medical Journal is a monthly peer-reviewed general medical journal. It was established in 1960 and is published by Medknow Publications on behalf of the Singapore Medical Association. The editor-in-chief is Poh Kian Keong. According to the Journal Citation Reports, the journal has a 2021 impact factor of 3.331.
