= BioMedical Admissions Test =

Aptitude test

BioMedical Admission Test
- Acronym: BMAT
- Type: Admission test
- Administrator: Cambridge Assessment
- Year started: 2001
- Year terminated: 2023
- Score range: Part I: 1.0 – 9.0; Part II: 1.0 – 9.0; Part III: 1E – 5A
- Languages: British English
- Website: www.admissionstesting.org/for-test-takers/bmat/

The BioMedical Admissions Test (BMAT) was an aptitude test used as part of the admissions process for Medicine, Biomedical Sciences and Dentistry in some universities in the United Kingdom, Singapore, Spain, Malaysia, Thailand, Hungary, Croatia and the Netherlands. In 2023, Cambridge Assessment announced that it would withdraw from the admissions test market and cease provision of the BMAT examination. All UK universities that previously used the BMAT have announced that, from 2024 onwards, the University Clinical Aptitude Test will be used instead.

== History ==
BMAT was developed by Cambridge Assessment Admissions Testing in response to requests from academics at medical and veterinary schools for an assessment that would enable them to differentiate between applicants who appear equally well qualified and suited to the course, and provide a way of assessing the potential of students who have a range of different qualifications.

Initially, it was taken up by Oxford University for Medicine and Physiology (replacing the OMAT); the University of Cambridge for Medicine and Veterinary Science (replacing the MVAT) and University College London, for Medicine.

From 2011, the new Lee Kong Chian School of Medicine (LKC Medicine) in Singapore, a partnership between Imperial College London and Nanyang University, started using BMAT as part of its entry process for Medicine.

Over the past few years, universities introducing BMAT as part of their entry requirements for Medicine courses have included Brighton and Sussex Medical School (BSMS) (2013), Leiden University in the Netherlands (2014), the University of Leeds (2012), the University of Navarra in Spain (2015), Lancaster University (2016), the Faculty of Medicine, University of Malaya in Malaysia (2016). The vast majority of other universities at the time, especially in the United Kingdom, used an alternative admissions assessment - the UCAT.

In 2017, a number of institutions in Thailand started using BMAT as part of their entry requirements for Medicine and Dentistry courses, initially starting with the Faculty of Medicine Ramathibodi Hospital, Mahidol University and the Chulabhorn International College of Medicine of Thammasat University. This was followed by the Faculty of Medicine, Chulalongkorn University, Faculty of Medicine, Srinakharinwirot University, Faculty of Medicine, Chiang Mai University, Faculty of Medicine, Khon Kaen University, Faculty of Medicine, King Mongkut's Institute of Technology Ladkrabang, Faculty of Dentistry, Mahidol University (Mahidol International Dental School), Suranaree University of Technology, and Faculty of Medicine Vajira Hospital, Navamindradhiraj University as part of the first round (entrance by portfolio) of the Thai University Central Admissions System (TCAS) for the 2018 intake, after educational reforms in 2017.

For the 2018 intake, CEU Cardenal Herrara University in Spain, the University of Pécs in Hungary, the University of Rijeka and the University of Zagreb, both in Croatia, have started using BMAT as an entry requirement to courses such as Medicine and Dentistry.

Most recently in 2022, the BMAT exam date was brought forward from the normal date (1st Tuesday of the month in November) to the 18th of October, giving students two fewer weeks to prepare than the norm. It has also been announced that the BMAT will be running for the last time in 2023 (likely October). From 2024 onwards, the BMAT will not run.

== Format ==
BMAT was a 2-hour, pen-and-paper test, which consists of three sections. The first two sections were both multiple choice questions and the third section is a writing task.

=== Section 1: Thinking Skills ===
This section was designed to test generic skills in problem-solving and understanding arguments. It was made up of 32 questions, with 60 minutes to complete.

=== Section 2: Scientific Knowledge and Applications ===
This section tested the ability to apply scientific knowledge typically covered in school Science and Mathematics by the age of 16 (for example, GCSE in the UK and IGCSE internationally). It was made up of 27 questions, with 30 minutes to complete. The scope of scientific knowledge included that of Mathematics, Physics, Chemistry and Biology.

=== Section 3: Writing Task ===
This section tested the ability to select, develop and organise ideas, and to communicate them in writing, concisely and effectively. Applicants were required to complete one writing task from a choice of three questions, with 30 minutes to complete.

Calculators and dictionaries, including bilingual dictionaries, were unable to be used in the exam.

== Scoring ==
For Sections 1 and 2 the total raw marks for each section were converted onto the BMAT 9-point scale. The scores were given to one decimal place. The scale was designed so that typical candidates who are invited for interview at the most highly competitive medical courses score around 5.0. The best candidates scored 6.0 or higher (roughly 10% of candidates in recent years) and a few exceptional candidates (>5%) scored higher than 7.0. The average score of all candidates tended to fall around 4.0-4.5.

For Section 3, candidates got two scores – one for quality of content (on a scale of 1– 5, with 5 being the highest) and one for quality of written English (on the scale A, C, E, with A being the highest). Each BMAT essay was marked by two examiners and the two marks were combined to give an overall score ranging from 1E to 5A. An image of the candidate's Writing Task was supplied to each institution to which the candidate has applied.

== Test sessions and results ==
BMAT was normally taken at authorised ‘open centres’ which are located around the world. For the test session that takes place in late October/early November, UK applicants could often take the test in their school or college.

The timing of the test was designed to fit in with the timescales for Medicine applications for the institutions across the world using the test. Each year, the following test sessions took place:

- BMAT – May
- BMAT – late August/early September
- BMAT – late October/early November
- BMAT – February

Typically, for each test session, students were required to register themselves or be registered for the test, by their school, at least a month in advance.

BMAT results were generally issued 3–4 weeks after the test has taken place, either by a Statement of Results or via the Metritests system.

BMAT results were only valid in the year that the test is taken.

== Usage ==
BMAT results were used in a variety of ways by the different institutions using it: for example, Oxford University combined the results with GCSE grades, with both results being equally weighted, to decide who is called for interview. Other universities such as Brighton ascribed a score to each section of the BMAT, and then candidates are then ranked according to their BMAT grade before being called for interview.

Often, it was seen as just part of the application process – previous examination results, a teacher's reference, the applicant's personal statement, and predicted grades are also important.

== Preparation ==
BMAT did not require a lot of extra study as it is designed to test skills and knowledge that candidates are expected to already have. Practice materials, including the test specification, practice questions, past papers, and an Assumed Subject Knowledge guide for Section 2 are available to candidates for free from the Cambridge Assessment Admissions Testing website.

There were some companies that help with coaching for the BMAT, however these companies are not endorsed by Cambridge Assessment who administer the test.

== Validity ==
A 2022 paper entitled BMAT's predictive validity for medical school performance: a retrospective cohort study by Davies et al. looked at BMAT scored and performance at medical school using data from Imperial College School of Medicine and Lee Kong Chian School of Medicine and found that "no clear evidence of incremental validity for any BMAT Section scores over A-level grades." and that "Schools who wish to assess scientific knowledge independently of A-levels may find BMAT Section 2 useful. Comparison with previous studies indicates that, overall, BMAT seems less useful than comparable tools. Larger-scale studies are needed."

== List of universities that had used BMAT ==
- UK/rest of the world: a list of universities and courses that had used BMAT can be found here.
- Croatia, Hungary and Spain: information about the universities that had used BMAT can be found here.
- The Netherlands: a list of institutions and courses that once required BMAT in the Netherlands can be found here.

== See also ==
- Cambridge Assessment Admissions Testing
- GAMSAT
- UKCAT
