= English Literature Admissions Test =

The English Literature Admissions Test (ELAT) was a subject-specific admissions test, used as part of the admissions process for undergraduate courses in English language and literature, combined English and modern languages and classics and English at the University of Oxford. As of 2016, ELAT had also been used by the University of Cambridge for admission to its undergraduate English course.

ELAT was held pre-interview stage, in late October/early November. Results were available to candidates and test centres via the Cambridge Assessment Admissions Testing Results Online website up to and including October 2022. Administration of the test in 2023 was conducted by Tata Consultancy Services.

== History ==
ELAT was developed by Cambridge Assessment Admissions Testing in partnership with the University of Oxford. The test was developed to help admissions tutors differentiate within a large pool of extremely well-qualified applicants and provide information about applicants’ skills in close reading of literary texts. The test was trialled by Oxford in 2006 and became part of their admissions process in 2007. In 2016, the test was adopted by the University of Cambridge for admission to its undergraduate English course.

October 2023 saw the first instance of the test to be conducted via computer, delivered by Tata Consultancy Services, following Cambridge Assessment Admissions Testing's decision to exit the testing market. The 2023 run of tests by Tata experienced a number of issues; the ELAT suffered technical issues on loading and saving, with further "clear errors in the test's rubric". On October 20th, the Faculty of English announced that "ELAT scores [would] not be used in any formal shortlisting calculation."

In April 2024, the Faculty of English at the University of Oxford announced that it had "taken the decision not to set an admissions test (the Oxford ELAT) for candidates applying in October 2024 to study English." Candidates applying to study English remain required to send samples of written work.

The Cambridge colleges still require applicants for English to take a very similar test, though this is now done after shortlisting for interview and there is no fee. The format is almost the same as the old ELAT (with a wording change), though the scripts would be marked by the college and considered alongside the interview. A sample assessment is available at

== Format ==
ELAT is a 90-minute computer-based test, which seeks to measure those skills needed to succeed on English or English-related degree courses. It assesses candidates’ close reading skills and their ability to shape and articulate an informed response to unfamiliar literary material. It consists of six literary extracts, from poetry, prose or drama. Candidates write one essay comparing two of the passages. Applicants are expected to comment on elements such as the language, imagery, allusion, syntax, form and structure. Marks are not awarded for references to other texts or authors, or for applying theoretical frameworks.

Candidates are asked to carry out the following task:

Select two of the passages (a) to (f) and compare and contrast them in any ways that seem interesting to you, paying particular attention to distinctive features of structure, language and style. In your introduction, indicate briefly what you intend to explore or illustrate through close reading of your chosen passages.

Formerly, candidates were allowed to compare two or three of the passages, but from 2018 onwards candidates may only select two passages.

There will be some sort of link between the six passages, which will be explained in the introduction.

== Scoring ==
Each script is marked by two external examiners. Each examiner gives a mark out of 30 and these are combined to give an overall mark out of 60. A third examiner will mark the script if there is a difference of five or more between the marks, and the overall score will be the two nearest marks combined.

The University of Oxford uses candidates' marks by breaking them down into four bands:

- Band 1 (top): candidates most likely to be called for interview (unless other indicators suggest otherwise)
- Band 2: candidates who should probably be invited to interview
- Band 3: candidates who may not be called to interview (unless there is convincing evidence to suggest otherwise)
- Band 4: candidates who are less likely to be invited to interview (unless other factors outweigh the evidence of the test).

The University of Cambridge do not use these bands.

For both Oxford and Cambridge, a full breakdown of marks for each candidate is provided to admissions tutors.

== Timing and results ==
ELAT is normally sat at an applicant's school or college. Alternatively, the test can be taken at Cambridge Assessment Admissions Testing's authorised ‘open centres’ worldwide.

The timing of the test is designed to fit in with the timescales for applications to the Universities of Oxford and Cambridge. Candidates can be entered for the test from September to mid-October. ELAT takes place in later October/early November.

Results are automatically sent to the college where the candidate has applied. Statements of Results are typically issued to candidates and test centres in mid-January when they can be accessed online by candidates and test centres.

== Usage ==
The Universities of Oxford and Cambridge use ELAT as part of their admissions processes, but it is only one of the elements used to decide whether to invite applicants for interview.

== Preparation ==
ELAT is designed to not require a lot of extra study. It is not a test of wide reading and there are no assumptions about the texts that candidates should have read. Candidates can practise for the test using specimen questions and past papers, which can be downloaded for free from the Cambridge Assessment Admissions Testing website.

== See also ==
- Cambridge Assessment Admissions Testing
