= Collection (Oxford colleges) =

University of Oxford terminology

At colleges of the University of Oxford, a Collection may be one of two things:

- An examination taken at the beginning of term by undergraduates/graduates, testing the work done in the previous term, and often based on past paper questions (typically a three-hour exam). Undergraduates usually sit one or two Collections per term, but this can vary by tutor and by college. Collections are collegiate (or sometimes departmental), rather than University examinations, and assist in predicting a student's final degree result rather than constituting a part of it.
  - A Penal Collection might be set if an undergraduate has failed to work hard enough. Failure to achieve a minimum mark set in advance may result in the student's being rusticated for a set period, or even being “sent down” — that is, permanently expelled from the college.
- A meeting at the end of term, usually with a set of tutors or—very occasionally—with the Head of House of the college, at which reports of the term's work are read, or (especially for postgraduates) the student's progress is discussed. These are sometimes known as “hand-shaking”, "academic reviews", or “Principal's (Dean's/Master's/Warden's/President's/Provost's/Rector's, etc.) Collections”.
