= Thinking Skills Assessment =

Former admissions test

- Acronym: TSA
- Type: University admissions test
- Administrator: Cambridge Assessment Admissions Testing
- Skills tested: Problem solving, critical thinking and essay writing
- Purpose: Admission to selected undergraduate courses
- Regions: Worldwide
- Languages: English
- Used by: Formerly the University of Cambridge, University of Oxford and University College London

The Thinking Skills Assessment (TSA) was a generic admissions test which was used as part of the admissions process for entry to some undergraduate courses at the University of Cambridge, the University of Oxford and University College London.

Cambridge and UCL had stopped using TSA by 2022. Oxford, its final user, last administered the test in 2025 for applicants seeking entry in 2026. For applications made in 2026 for 2027 entry, Oxford replaced TSA with the Test of Academic Reasoning for Admissions (TARA).

== History ==
TSA was developed and run by Cambridge Assessment Admissions Testing. It was developed to help universities assess whether applicants had the skills and aptitudes considered essential for higher education study. Cambridge Assessment Admissions Testing produced and distributed practice materials, including specimen questions and past papers, on its website.

The test was first introduced for undergraduate entry to the University of Cambridge in 2001 and was used as part of the admissions process for a number of undergraduate courses. In its final years at Cambridge, it was used for applications to the Land Economy course only.

In 2007, the University of Oxford introduced TSA as part of its admissions process for Philosophy, Politics and Economics (PPE). At this stage, the test was known as the ‘PPE Admissions Test’. The use of TSA was extended for entry to Economics and Management in 2008; to Experimental Psychology, and Psychology and Philosophy in 2009; Geography, Philosophy and Linguistics, and Psychology and Linguistics in 2012; and in 2015 to Human Sciences. From 2016, candidates applying for Chemistry were required to sit a version of TSA consisting of Section 1 of the test only (TSA S1), with History and Economics requiring the same from 2017. From 2018, the University of Oxford no longer required applicants to take TSA for entry to its Geography course.

Oxford administered TSA for the final time in October 2025, for applicants seeking entry in 2026. From the 2026 application cycle for 2027 entry, courses which had previously required TSA instead required TARA.

From 2008 to 2021, University College London used TSA to assist in the selection of applicants to European and International Social and Political Studies (EISPS). From 2022 onwards, UCL replaced TSA with its own Thinking Skills Test (TST), which was modelled on TSA Section 1 but was delivered and marked internally.

== Format ==
TSA consisted of one or two sections, depending on the university and course being applied for. Section 2 was used in addition to Section 1 by the University of Oxford for certain courses.

- Section 1 (90 minutes): 50 multiple-choice questions testing problem solving (including numerical and spatial reasoning) and critical thinking skills (including understanding argument and reasoning using everyday language).
- Section 2 (30 minutes): Candidates were required to answer one essay question from a choice of four. The questions were not subject-specific. It tested the ability to organise ideas in a clear and concise manner and communicate them effectively in writing.

== Scoring ==
The multiple-choice answers in Section 1 were marked by Cambridge Assessment Admissions Testing, with one mark available per question. Final scores were calculated to one decimal place on the TSA scale, which ran approximately from 0 to 100, using the Rasch statistical technique.

The writing task component of TSA (Section 2) used by the University of Oxford was reviewed by admissions tutors. The replacement exam, the Test of Academic Reasoning for Admissions (TARA), has a writing task similar to the TSA's writing component. This is confirmed as not being used in the admissions process for two Oxford courses; Economics and Management and History and Economics.

An average score was about 60, equivalent to around 28 out of 50 raw marks. A score of 70 or above generally placed a candidate in the top 10% of candidates and was equivalent to approximately 38 out of 50.

== Timing and results ==
=== The University of Cambridge and the University of Oxford ===
For the University of Cambridge and the University of Oxford, TSA was held in late October or early November as a pre-interview test taken at schools, colleges or authorised test centres globally. It was originally paper-based, although Oxford's final sittings were delivered digitally. Results were issued in January of the following year.

== Usage ==
The exact use of results varied between the subjects which used the test, and candidates were advised to refer to their chosen course for precise details.

== See also ==
- Cambridge Assessment Admissions Testing
- Test of Academic Reasoning for Admissions
- University admissions tests in the United Kingdom
