= Singapore Medical Association =

Medical association based in Singapore

- Abbreviation: SMA
- Predecessor: Malaya Branch of the British Medical Association
- Formation: September 15, 1959; 67 years ago
- Type: Professional association
- Registration no.: S61SS0168E
- Purpose: Advocacy, professional development, publications
- Headquarters: Singapore
- Fields: Medicine
- Members: 10,835 (2025)
- Official language: English
- President: Dr NG Chee Kwan
- Website: www.sma.org.sg

The Singapore Medical Association (abbreviated SMA) is a non-governmental, not-for-profit professional association representing the medical professionals in Singapore. It was established on September 15, 1959, replacing the Malaya Branch of the British Medical Association. As of March 2025, it had over 10,835 members. It publishes the monthly SMA Newsletter and peer-reviewed Singapore Medical Journal.

== See also ==
- Australian Medical Association (AMA)
- British Medical Association (BMA)
