= Graduate Medical School Admissions Test =

Exam for prospective medical students

The Graduate Medical School Admissions Test (commonly known as the GAMSAT, formerly Graduate Australian Medical School Admissions Test) is a test used to select candidates applying to study medicine, dentistry, optometry, pharmacy and veterinary science at Australian, British, and Irish universities for admission to their Graduate Entry Programmes (candidates must have a recognised bachelor's degree, or equivalent, completed prior to commencement of the degree). Candidates may take the test in a test centre in one of the 6 countries, being Australia, Ireland, New Zealand, Singapore, the United Kingdom and the United States, offering the test.

GAMSAT makes use of a marking system known as item response theory, meaning that scores are issued according to a sigmoid distribution and can be converted to a percentile rank based on the percentile curve that is issued at the same time as results are released. Candidates are not informed of their raw mark and, in any case, this bears little resemblance to their final score.

Sitting the GAMSAT is a separate process to applying to study medicine. Most universities with graduate-entry medical programs require:

- Completion of any bachelor's degree (this includes non-science-related degrees, e.g., arts or law)
- Obtaining a prerequisite GAMSAT cut-off score
- Achieving prerequisite marks in the bachelor's degree

Once a candidate has fulfilled these criteria, they may then apply to universities offering a medicine/dentistry/optometry/pharmacy/veterinary science course. If the GAMSAT and GPA scores, or GAMSAT and Degree Class, of the candidate are of sufficient calibre, the candidate may be invited to attend an interview at one or more of the universities to which they applied, based on priority laid out in the student's application. This interview is conducted by established medical practitioners and education professionals, and aims to elucidate the candidate's personal qualities, ethics, verbal reasoning skills, and motivation to study medicine at their university. If successful at this interview (as one half to two thirds of candidates are), then the candidate may be offered a place on their chosen course at the university.

== History ==
GAMSAT was originally produced in 1995 by four Australian medical schools as a tool to select for candidates applying to study medicine. Since then, its use in Australia has expanded to eleven graduate-entry medicine courses:

- Australian National University
- Deakin University
- Flinders University (although admission is not via the GEMSAS system, as with the other Australian universities)
- Griffith University (Gold Coast campus)
- Macquarie University
- The University of Melbourne (dentistry and optometry in addition to medicine)
- The University of Notre Dame Australia (Fremantle)
- The University of Notre Dame Australia (Sydney)
- The University of Queensland
- The University of Sydney (although admission is not via the GEMSAS system, as with the other Australian universities) (dentistry and pharmacy in addition to medicine)
- The University of Western Australia (dentistry and podiatric medicine in addition to medicine)
- The University of Wollongong

In 1999, it was brought into use by British universities and has since expanded to ten universities across the United Kingdom:

- Cardiff University
- Keele University
- University of Liverpool
- Scottish Graduate Entry Medicine Programme (University of St Andrews, University of Dundee and University of the Highlands and Islands)
- St Georges, University of London
- Swansea University
- University of Nottingham
- Ulster University
- University of Exeter
- University of Plymouth

In the Republic of Ireland, the University of Limerick and Royal College of Surgeons in Ireland adopted the GAMSAT for medical applicants starting with the 2007 enrolment cycle. It is currently used as the selection criteria for all graduate-entry programmes in Ireland (University College Dublin, University of Limerick, University College Cork, and Royal College of Surgeons in Ireland).

Apart from these, Oceania University of Medicine, Jagiellonian University of Medicine and Poznan University of Medical Sciences also accept GAMSAT scores.

== Usage ==
GAMSAT is a reasoning rather than knowledge-based test. It is not to be confused with the unrelated UCAT. UCAT is used for applicants to traditional undergraduate-entry medical schools, and is open to high school leavers.

== Format ==
GAMSAT is held twice a year: in late March / early April in Ireland and Australia, and around the middle/end of September in the UK and Australia albeit with fewer available venues. It is administered by the Australian Council for Educational Research (ACER) and requires timely registration, usually by late January for Ireland and Australia or August for the UK.

There is no prescribed synopsis of the test, but it does require the following levels of knowledge

- Biology and Chemistry - 1st year university level
- Physics - Australian Year 12 level
- English - HSC Standard English level

The test takes a full day, i.e. from 8 am until about 4 pm.

There are three sections that comprise the GAMSAT

- Section I comprises 62 questions in 100 minutes from the Humanities and Social Sciences
- Section II - 2 essays assessing written communication (65 minutes)
- Section III - 75 physical science questions in 150 minutes after 1-hour lunch

A score is calculated based on performance in all three sections, with double weighting applied to section III (except in the case of applications to the University of Melbourne, University of Sydney and University of Queensland, which weights all three sections equally). This overall score is then used by medical schools to determine which candidates shall be invited to interview.

== Attendance ==
According to ACER, "quite a few thousand" attend the GAMSAT annually worldwide but official figures have not been released. Unofficially however, it is reported that approximately 10,000 candidates attended the 2010 exam.

== Eligibility for GAMSAT ==
GAMSAT is available to any person who has completed a Bachelor or an undergraduate honours degree, or who will be in the penultimate (second-last) or final year of study, at the time of sitting the test, or, in the case of applicants to University of Exeter Medical School and Plymouth University Peninsula Schools of Medicine & Dentistry, who believes he/she has achieved an appropriate level of intellectual maturity and subject knowledge to meet the demands of the test.

To sit GAMSAT you must be a bona fide prospective applicant to a course for which GAMSAT is a prerequisite.

There is no limit to the number of times a bona fide candidate may sit GAMSAT.

== See also ==
- University Clinical Aptitude Test (created by Pearson)
- Special Tertiary Admissions Test (created by ACER)
- ACT Scaling Test (also created by ACER)
- Medical College Admission Test
