= Australian Council for Educational Research =

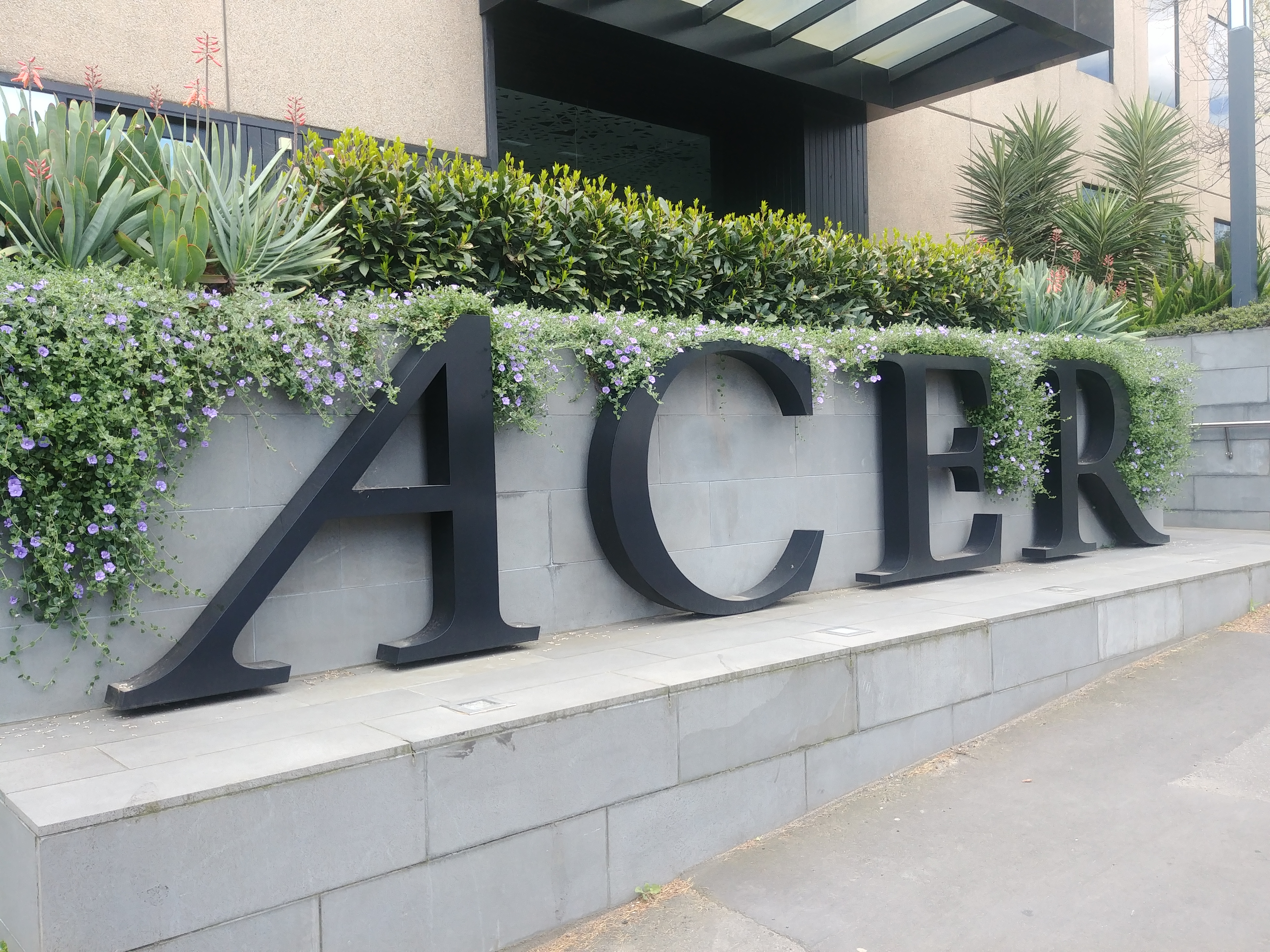
Australian Council for Educational Research Camberwell office

The Australian Council for Educational Research (ACER), established in 1930, is an independent educational research organisation based in Camberwell, Victoria (Melbourne) and with offices in Adelaide, Brisbane, Cyberjaya, Dubai, London, New Delhi, Perth and Sydney. ACER develops and manages a range of testing and assessment services and conducts research and analysis in the education sector.

== History ==
On 1 April 1930, two staff members, Ken Cunningham, the inaugural chief executive and secretary Mary Campbell, established ACER's first office in two rooms of the T&G building in central Melbourne. By the end of the 1930s ACER's total staff had expanded to five.

ACER was established with a grant from the Carnegie Corporation of New York, a foundation itself established "to promote the advancement and diffusion of knowledge and understanding". Although the Carnegie grants were to benefit the people of the United States, a small percentage of the funds could be used for the same purpose in countries that were or had been members of the British Commonwealth. The grant to establish ACER was made following a visit to Australia by American James Russell on behalf of the Carnegie Corporation to assess the state of education in Australia and investigate appropriate means of assistance.

The official title 'Australian Educational Research Council' was first selected, but then changed at the first council meeting held in 1930 to Australian Council for Educational Research, which has not changed again since.

== CEOs ==
Chief executive	Tenure	Notable contributions to education research
K.S. Cunningham	1930–1954	Chaired Social Science Research Council of Australia (1943–1952)
W.C. Radford	1955–1976	Edited Review of Education in Australia (1939–1964); Chaired committee to review of public examinations in Queensland and served on committee of inquiry into education in South Australia
J.P. Keeves	1977–1985	Editor of Educational research, methodology and measurement : an international handbook (1997) and Issues in education research (1999)
Barry McGaw	1985–1998	Director of Education of the OECD (1998–2005); chair of the board of the Australian Curriculum, Assessment and Reporting Authority (2009–)
Geoff Masters	1998–2024	Developed Partial Credit Model (1982); Undertook review of Queensland primary schools (2009); Review of NSW school curriculum (2018–19)
Lisa Rodgers	2024–present	Previously Director General, Department of Education, Western Australia; CEO of Australian Institute for Teaching and School Leadership; Deputy Secretary, Ministry of Education New Zealand.

CEO ACER India: Dr Priyanka Sharma (Acting)

Country Manager ACER Malaysia: Kris Sundarsagar

General Manager ACER Middle East: Aya Rajakaruna

CEO ACER UK: Colin Watson

== Organisational structure ==
ACER is an independent, not-for-profit organisation funded through contract work, fees for services and product sales. It has 500 staff working in its offices in Adelaide, Brisbane, Cyberjaya, Dubai, London, Melbourne, New Delhi, Perth and Sydney.

== ACER's work ==
After an early focus on Australian education, ACER now provides a range of services for an expanding number of international clients.

ACER has official partnership with the United Nations Educational, Scientific and Cultural Organization (UNESCO). ACER collaborates with UNESCO through the UNESCO Institute for Statistics and the UNESCO Office in Bangkok on initiatives such as the development of learning assessments for reading and mathematics, and associated tools and methodologies, that countries can use to monitor learning outcomes to inform educational policy.

ACER also works with organisations such as UNICEF, the World Bank, the Australian Department of Foreign Affairs and Trade, the Indian Central Board of Secondary Education and the United Kingdom Department for International Development, contributing to educational evaluation and reform in a number of countries. ACER is involved in the South East Asia Primary Learning Metrics (SEA-PLM) project, which assesses reading, writing, maths and global citizenship in Grade 5 students in the ASEAN region, in collaboration with the South East Asian Ministers of Education Organisation (SEAMEO) and UNICEF.

ACER research covers:

- Assessment and reporting: humanities, social sciences, mathematics and science
- Australian and international surveys
- Education and development
- Education policy and practice
- Psychometrics and methodology
- Systemwide testing
- Tertiary education

Some of ACER's work is conducted through its Global Education Monitoring (GEM) Centre.

ACER's research work has contributed to policy pertaining to Australian education, including learning progressions, the role of parents, the role of arts in education, teachers and school leaders, post-school education and training, tertiary students' engagement to equity in education.

A consortium led by ACER coordinated the OECD Programme for International Student Assessment (PISA), an international assessment of reading, mathematics and science, from 1997 until 2015. The OECD appointed ACER to lead the development and implementation of the PISA 2025 across more than 90 countries and economies, working with partners TAO, cApStAn and HallStat. ACER was engaged by the OECD to lead the first ever Assessment of Higher Education Learning Outcomes (AHELO) and to develop all of the new literacy tasks for the Programme of International Assessment of Adult Competencies.

ACER is also responsible for co-ordinating Australia's participation in the International Association for the Evaluation of Educational Achievement's Trends in International Mathematics and Science Study and Progress in International Reading Literacy Study. ACER has been involved in many other significant international studies and is a founding member of the Asia Pacific Educational Research Association (APERA) which links educational research organisations across the region.

In addition to research, ACER administers testing programs for scholarship selection, university entrance, psychologists and human resource management, some of which are delivered online. Tests, books and other materials are also published and sold through ACER Press for the education, psychology, human resources, special needs and speech pathology markets.

ACER offers a Masters-level unit in Understanding Rasch Measurement Theory. ACER also manages an annual research conference held in Australia each year.

== Well-known tests ==
ACER develops or administers a large range of tests. Some of the more well-known tests include:

- Progressive Achievement Tests
- International Benchmark Tests
- International Schools Assessment
- ACER Scholarship Tests
- Special Tertiary Admissions Test (STAT)
- GAMSAT
- HPAT-Ireland
- Literacy and Numeracy Test for Initial Teacher Education Students
