= Pieve Emanuele railway station =

Railway station in Italy

Pieve Emanuele
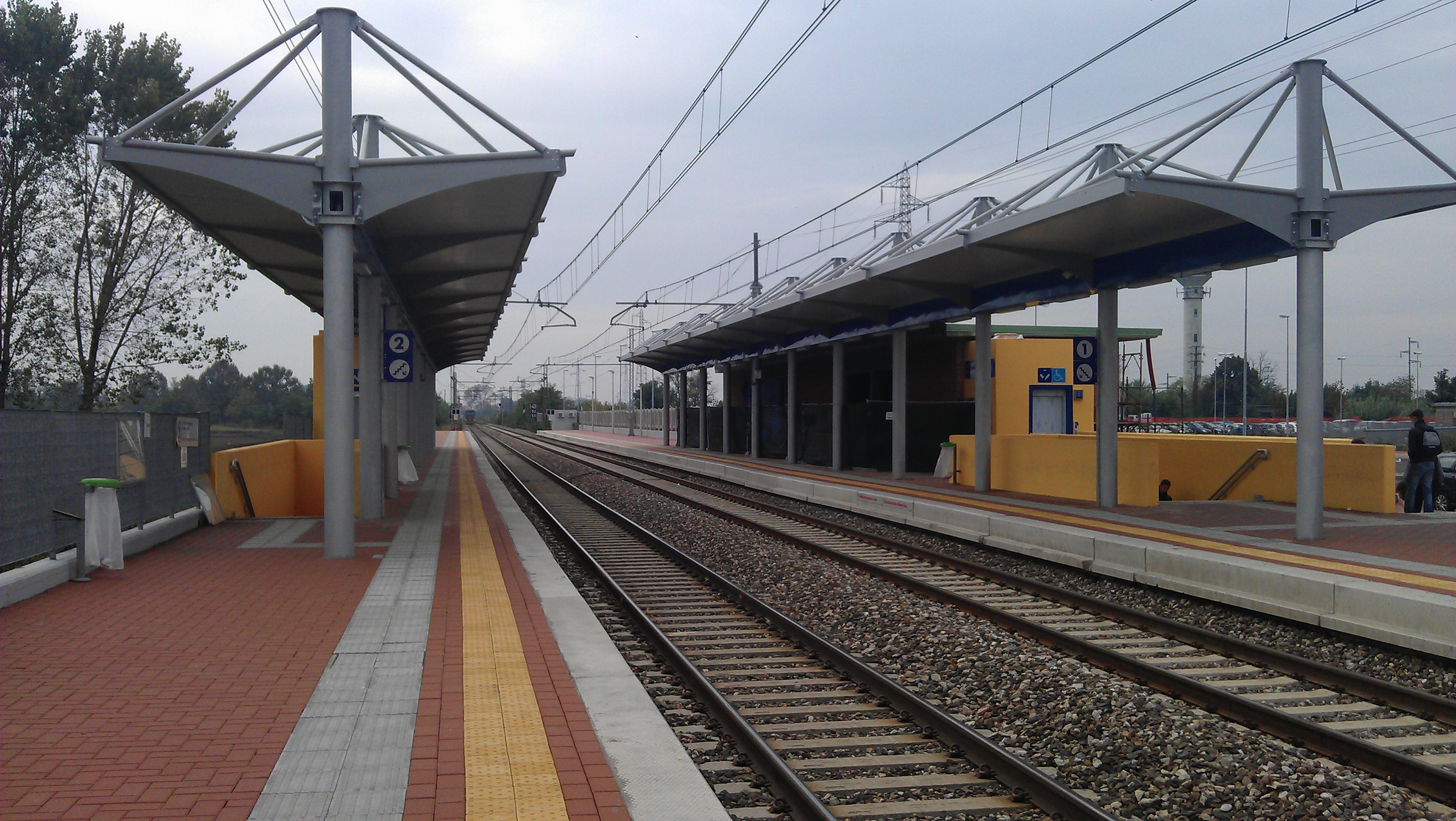

General information
- Location: Pieve Emanuele, Milan, Lombardy
- Coordinates: 45°20′20″N 09°12′10″E
- Operator: Rete Ferroviaria Italiana
- Line: Milan–Genoa
- Distance: 10.835 km (6.733 mi) from Milano Rogoredo
- Train operators: Trenord

Other information
- Fare zone: STIBM: Mi4
- Classification: ?

History
- Opened: 9 June 2013; 13 years ago

Services
Preceding station	Trenord	Following station
Locate Triulzi towards Milano Bovisa	Line S13 (Milan suburban railway service)	Villamaggiore towards Pavia
Location
- Location within Lombardy Location within Northern Italy Location within Italy

Pieve Emanuele railway station is a railway station in Italy. Located on the Milan–Genoa railway, it serves the municipality of Pieve Emanuele.

== Services ==
Pieve Emanuele is served by line S13 of the Milan suburban railway network, operated by the Lombard railway company Trenord.

== See also ==
- Milan suburban railway network
