= Locate di Triulzi =

Comune in Lombardy, Italy

Locate di Triulzi Locaa (Lombard)
- Comune
- Comune di Locate di Triulzi
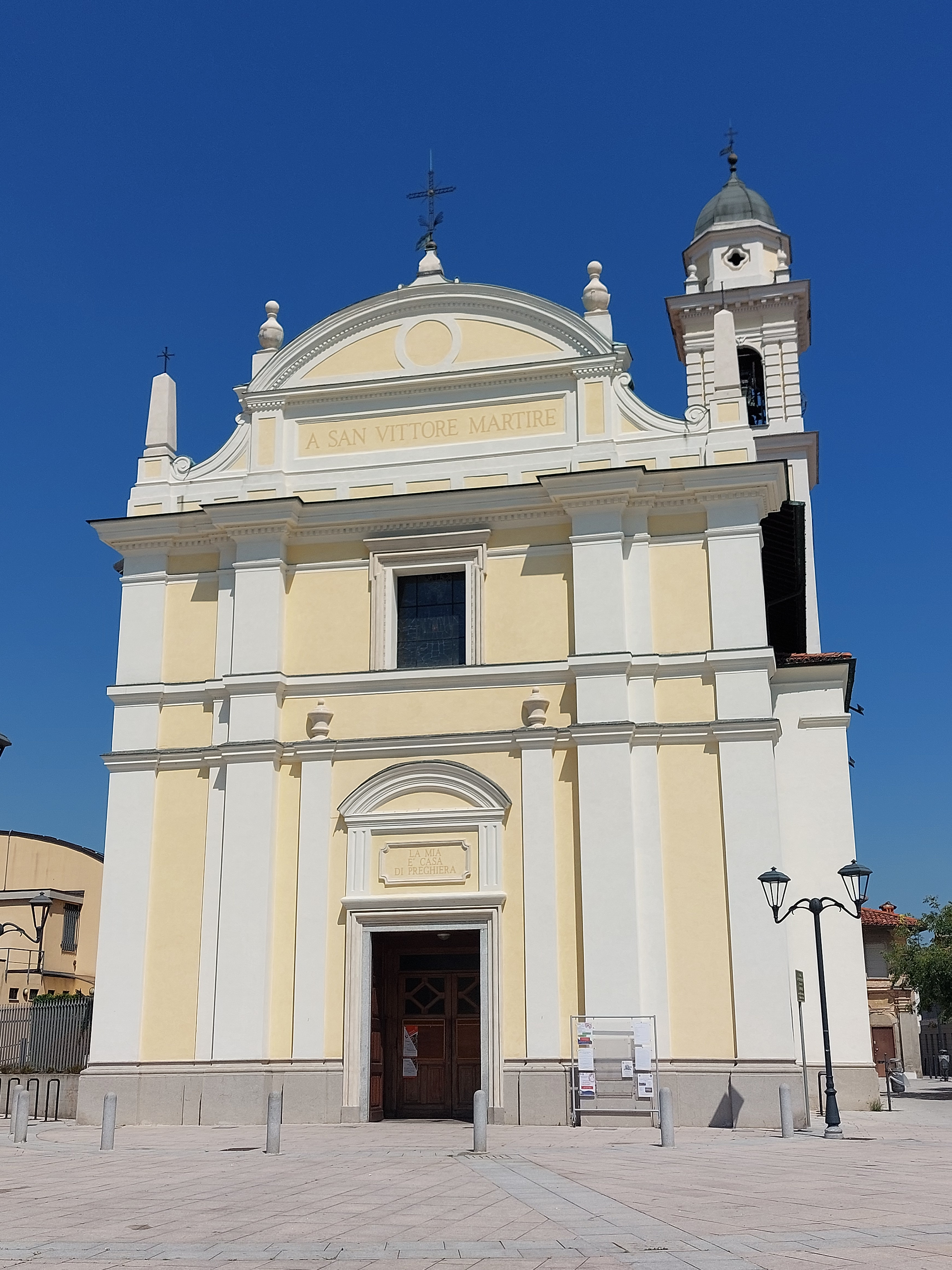
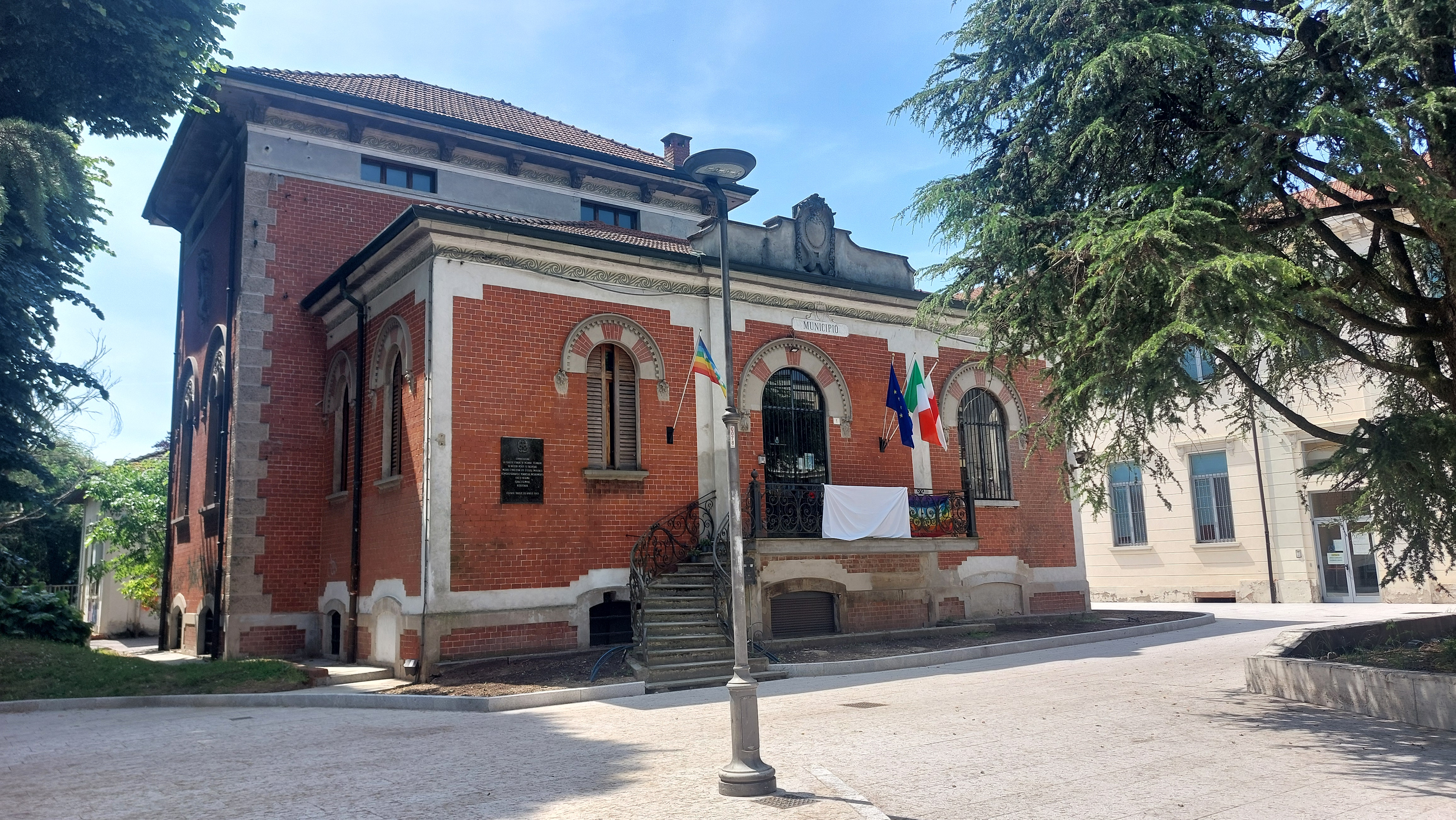
- Church of San Vittore Locate di Triulzi's town hall

- Flag Coat of arms

- Location within Italy Location within Lombardy
- Coordinates: 45°21′N 9°13′E
- Country: Italy
- Region: Lombardy
- Metropolitan city: Milan (MI)
- Frazioni: Gnignano, Moro

Government
  - Mayor: Davide Serranò

Area
  - Total: 12.61 km^{2} (4.87 sq mi)
- Elevation: 96 m (315 ft)

Population (31 December 2025)
  - Total: 10,360
  - Density: 821.6/km^{2} (2,128/sq mi)
- Demonym: Locatesi
- Time zone: UTC+1 (CET)
  - Summer (DST): UTC+2 (CEST)
- Postal code: 20085
- Dialing code: 02
- ISTAT code: 015125
- Patron saint: San Vittore
- Saint day: 8 May
- Website: Official website

Locate di Triulzi (Milanese: Locaa [luˈkaː]) is a comune (municipality) in the Metropolitan City of Milan, Lombardy, located about 14 kilometres (9 mi) southeast of Milan.

== Etymology ==
The settlement was, along with Pieve Emanuele, originally part of the Pieve di Leucate. In this name, "pieve" stood for the rural churches that were common in rural Italy of which the name stems from the latin "plebs", while "Leucate" (which then shifted to Locate), indicated the marcite, water meadows very common in northern Italy. In 1862 the comune changed name from Locate to the one it has today, Locate di Triulzi, with the Regio decreto 19 Ottobre 1862, n. 934.

== Geography ==
=== Topography ===
Locate di Triulzi is located on the left bank of the Lambro meridionale river about 14 kilometers south of Milan, and together with Pieve Emanuele and Carpiano it is the last comune of the area south-east of the lombard capital, after which there is the Province of Pavia. The average elevation is of 96 meters, with a minimum elevation of 90 meters and a maximum elevation of 101 meters. The municipality is located inside of the Parco Agricolo Sud Milano.

== Culture ==
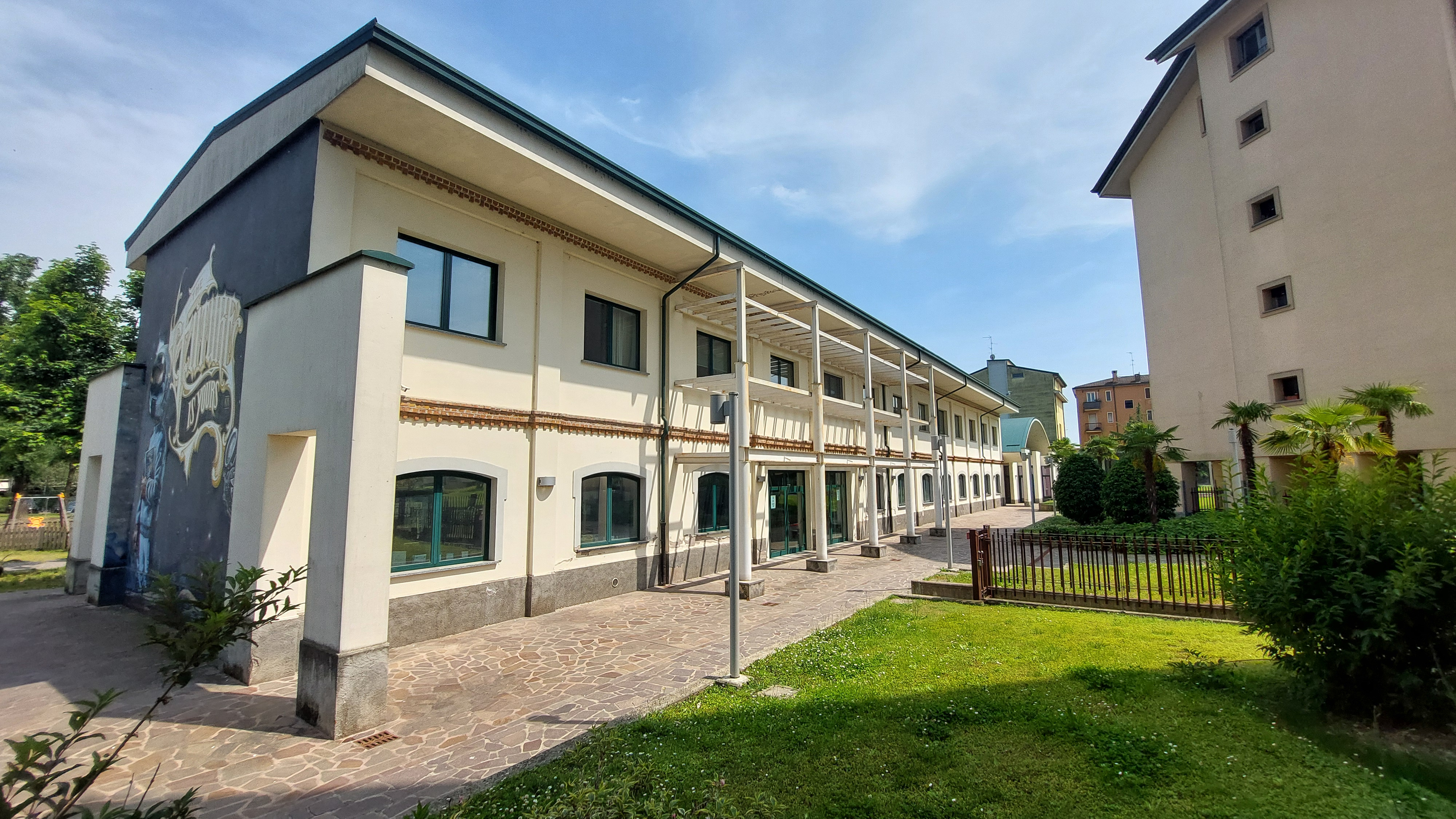
The municipal library

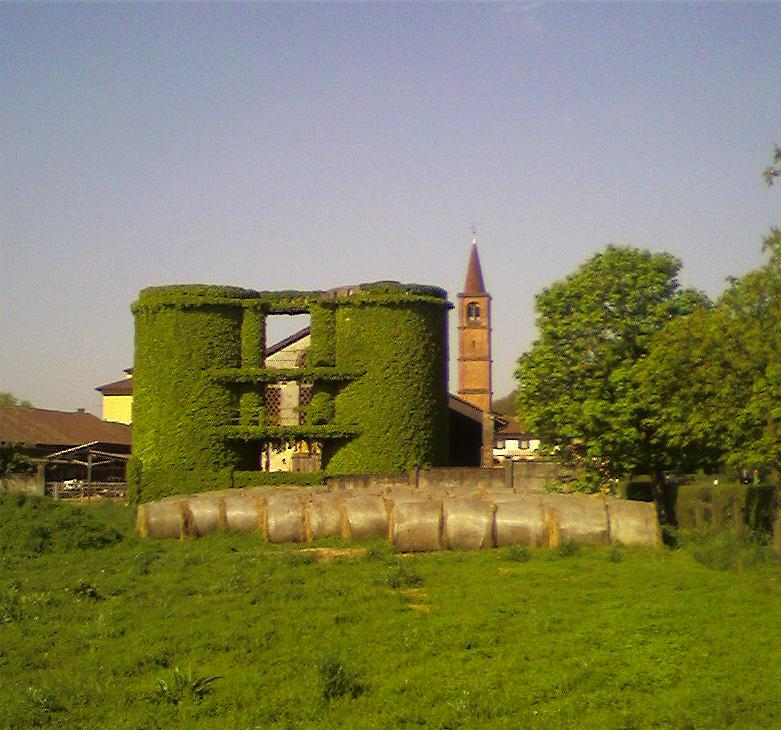
The bell tower of the Church of Santa Maria ad Fontem

=== Education ===
In 2025 in Locate di Triulzi there were a total of 3 public schools and 1 private kindergarten. Of the three public school one was another kindergarten, while the other two were a primary school and a middle school.

=== Libraries ===
In the comune there is a municipal library that offers multiple services other than lending books, such as spaces where to study or to work remotely, a computer area and a digital library.

=== Main sights ===
- Church of San Vittore, dedicated to the patron saint Victor Maurus. In 1573, the Archbishop of Milan, Charles Borromeo, visited an earlier church built in 1450, located in Locate di Triulzi on the site where the current Church of San Vittore now stands. Finding the structure in poor condition, he ordered its reconstruction and instructed the Trivulzio family to finance the work. The bell tower is of more recent construction, dating back to 1696. The whole complex is an example of Milanese baroque, a style that flourished under Charles Borromeo.
- Church of Santa Maria Ad Fontem, a Church that is actually a stratification of three churches that became one with time built upon an earlier chapel that was constructed in the 14th century. This chapel was likewise built upon an even earlier aedicula that dated back to the 13th century. This first small shrine rose upon a water spring of which the waters were maybe believed to be capable of miracles. Inside of the church there is a fresco of which the author is unknown. The style though resembles the one adopted by Leonardo da Vinci during his time in Milan.

== Administration ==
In April 2026, the administration led by Mayor Davide Serranò is currently governing the comune. The program of the mayor's civic list is focused on the protection of the town's environment, sustainability, fighting poverty and helping younger citizens through culture and sports.

Mayor	Term start	Term end	Party
Arianna Maria Censi	24 April 1995	13 June 2004	Civic list (centre-left)
Severino Carlo Preli	14 June 2004	25 May 2014	Civic list (centre-left)
Davide Serranò	26 May 2014	Incumbent	Civic list Locate Domani

== Demographics ==
=== Demographic evolution ===
Historical population

Year	Pop.	±%
1861	2,112	—
1871	2,130	+0.9%
1881	2,118	−0.6%
1901	2,390	+12.8%
1911	2,872	+20.2%
1921	2,808	−2.2%
1931	3,265	+16.3%

Year	Pop.	±%
1936	3,551	+8.8%
1951	4,639	+30.6%
1961	5,996	+29.3%
1971	6,501	+8.4%
1981	6,586	+1.3%
1991	8,148	+23.7%

Source: ISTAT

=== Foreign residents ===
As of the 1st January 2026, the number of foreign residents in Locate di Triulzi is 1.288.

== Infrastructure and trasportation ==
=== Railway ===
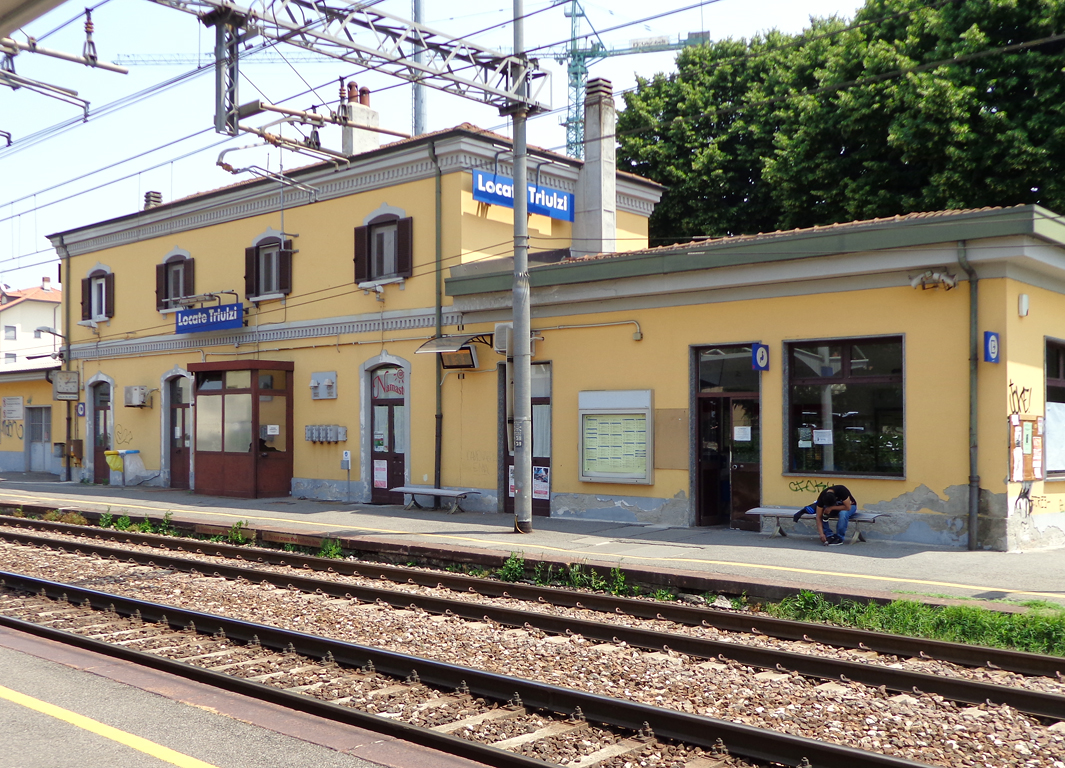
Locate di Triulzi's railway station.

Locate di Triulzi is served by its own railway station, located on the Milan-Genoa railway. The station has two platforms connected by an underpass: platform one is where trains headed towards Pavia stop, while on platform two stop the trains headed for Milan. The station is served by line S13 of the Milan suburban railway network, operated by Trenord.

=== Buses ===
Bus lines are operated by Autoguidovie for ATM, and they connect the comune to other ones south of Milan.
