= Canonica =

Canonica is a surname. Notable people with the name include:

- Emanuele Canonica (born 1971), Italian golfer
- Giorgio Walter Canonica (born 1947), Italian allergist and pulmonologist
- Luigi Canonica (1762–1844), Swiss architect and urban planner
- Pietro Canonica (1869–1959), Italian artist, composer, academic and senator
- Sibylle Canonica (born 1957), Swiss actress

== See also ==
- Canonica d'Adda, is a comune in the Province of Bergamo in the Italian region of Lombardy
- Eupithecia canonica, is a moth in the family Geometridae
