= Villamaggiore railway station =

Railway station in Italy

Villamaggiore
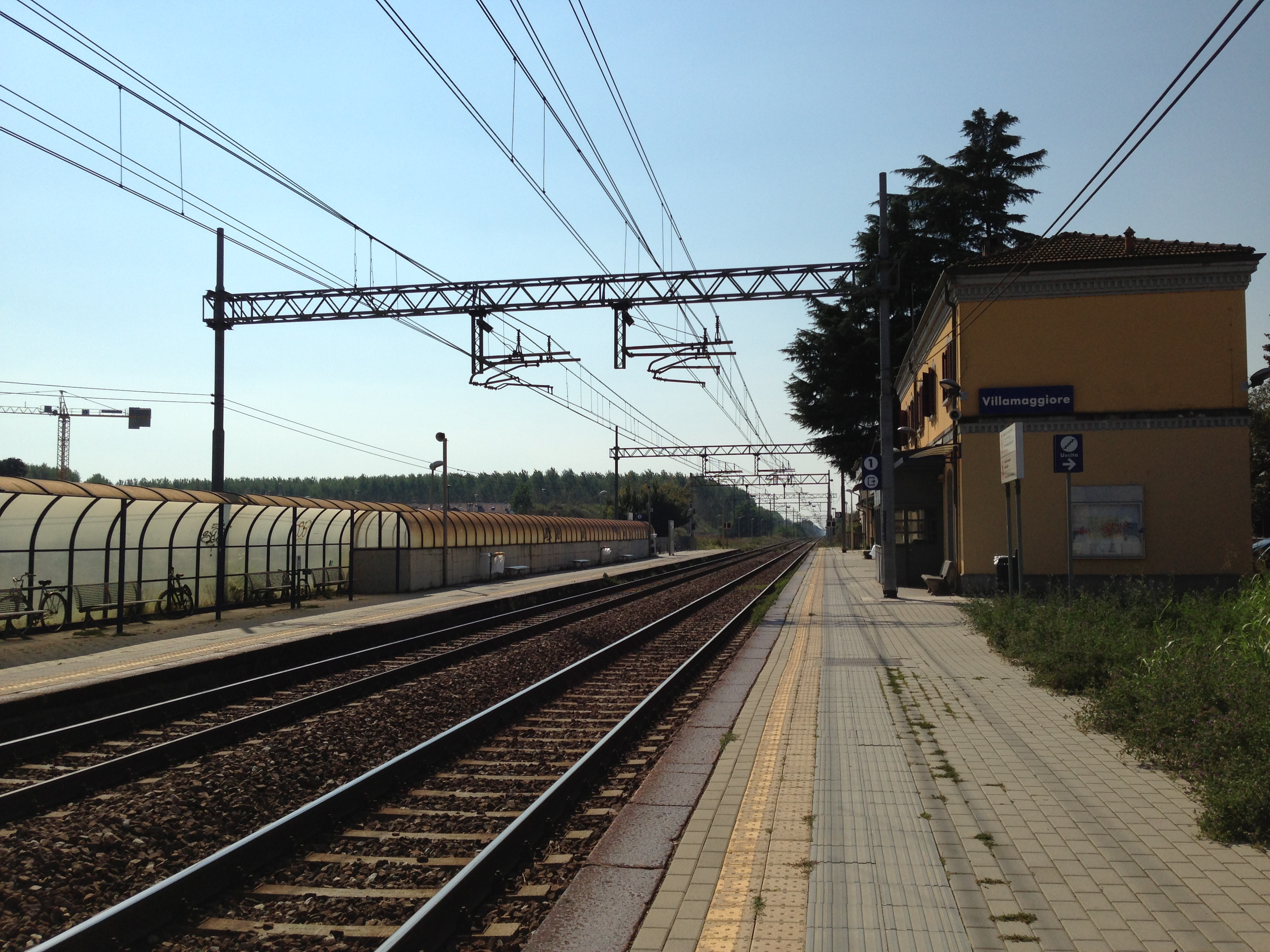

General information
- Location: Via Stazione; Lacchiarella, Milan, Lombardy; Italy
- Coordinates: 45°19′14″N 09°11′26″E
- Operator: Rete Ferroviaria Italiana
- Line: Milan–Genoa
- Distance: 13.207 km (8.206 mi) from Milano Rogoredo
- Train operators: Trenord

Other information
- Fare zone: STIBM: Mi5
- Classification: Silver

Services
Preceding station	Trenord	Following station
Pieve Emanuele towards Milano Bovisa	Line S13 (Milan suburban railway service)	Certosa di Pavia towards Pavia
Location
- Location within Lombardy Location within Northern Italy Location within Italy

Villamaggiore railway station is a railway station in Italy. Located on the Milan–Genoa railway, it serves the hamlet of Villamaggiore, in the municipality of Lacchiarella.

== Services ==
Villamaggiore is served by line S13 of the Milan suburban railway network, operated by the Lombard railway company Trenord.

== See also ==
- Milan suburban railway network
