= Locate Triulzi railway station =

Railway station in Italy

Locate Triulzi
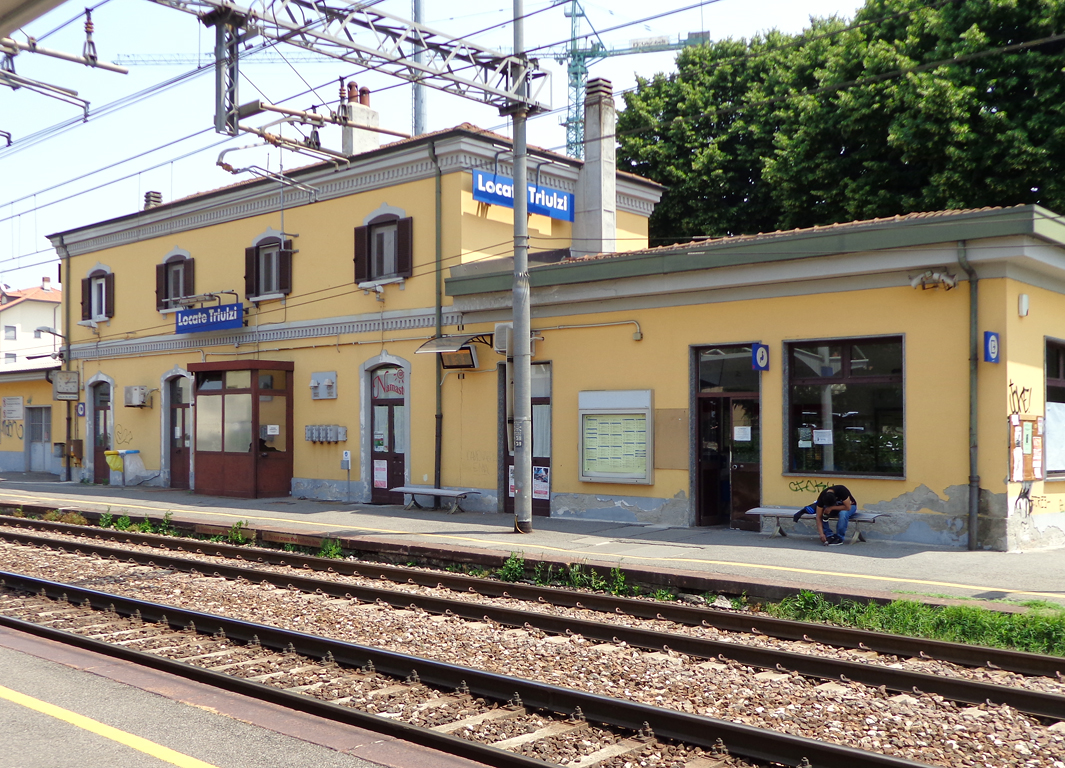

General information
- Location: Piazza Stazione, 1 Locate di Triulzi, Milan, Lombardy; Italy
- Coordinates: 45°21′35″N 09°13′17″E
- Operator: Rete Ferroviaria Italiana
- Line: Milan–Genoa
- Distance: 8.208 km (5.100 mi) from Milano Rogoredo
- Train operators: Trenord

Other information
- Fare zone: STIBM: Mi4
- Classification: Silver

Services
Preceding station	Trenord	Following station
Milano Rogoredo towards Milano Bovisa	Line S13 (Milan suburban railway service)	Pieve Emanuele towards Pavia
Location
- Location within Lombardy Location within Northern Italy Location within Italy

Locate Triulzi railway station is a railway station in Italy. Located on the Milan–Genoa railway, it serves the municipality of Locate di Triulzi.

== Services ==
The station is served by line S13 of the Milan suburban railway network, operated by the Lombard railway company Trenord.
