= Line S13 (Milan suburban railway service) =

Railway line in Milan, Italy

Garbagnate Milanese–Milano Passante–Pavia
- S13

Overview
- Status: Operational
- Locale: Milan, Italy
- Termini: Garbagnate Milanese; Pavia
- Stations: 13
- Website: Trenord (in Italian)

Service
- Type: Commuter rail
- System: Milan suburban railway service
- Route number: S13
- Rolling stock: Treno Servizio Regionale

History
- Opened: 2011

Technical
- Line length: 32 km (20 mi)
- Track gauge: 1,435 mm (4 ft 8 1/2 in)
- Electrification: 3,000 V DC
Route map
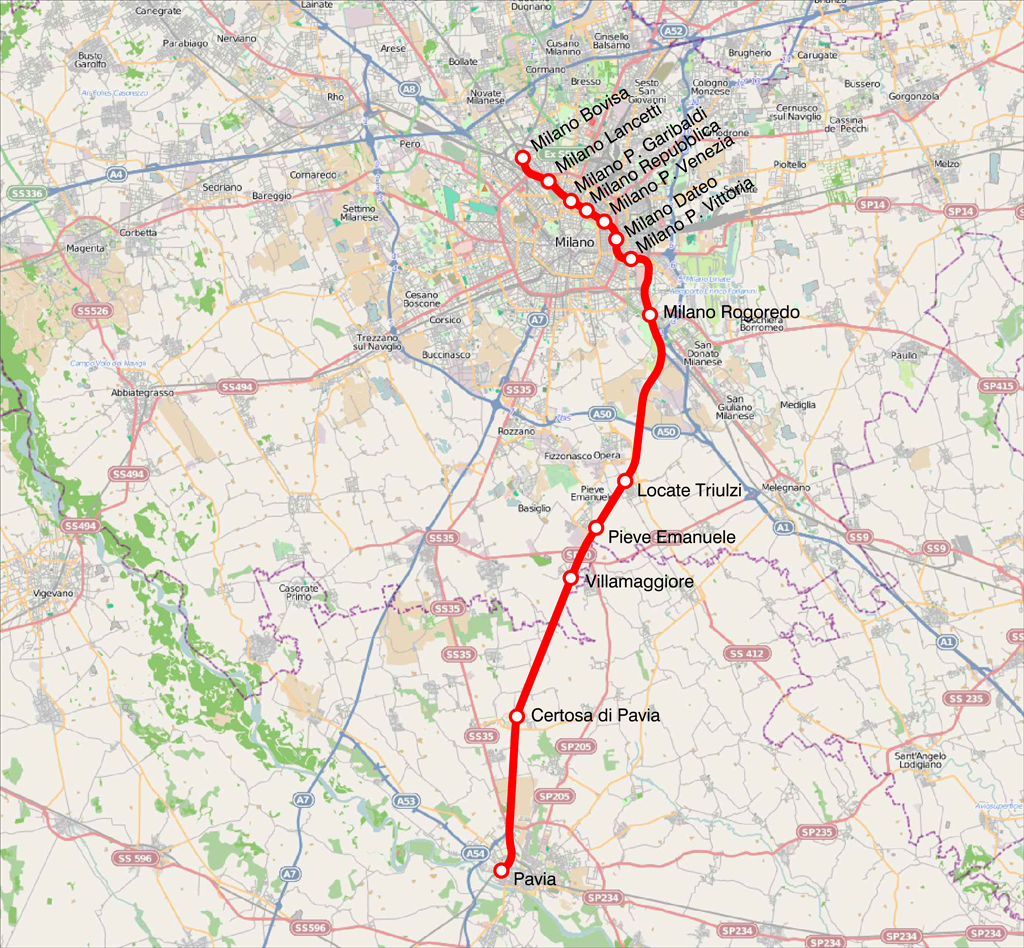
Map of line S13.

The S13 is a commuter rail route forming part of the Milan suburban railway service (Italian: Servizio ferroviario suburbano di Milano), which converges on the city of Milan, Italy.

The route runs over the infrastructure of the Milan Passante and Milan-Genoa railways. Like all but one of the other Milan suburban railway service routes, it is operated by Trenord.

== Route ==
- Milano Bovisa-Politecnico ↔ Milano Passante ↔ Pavia

Line S13, a cross-city route, heads initially in a southerly direction from Milano Bovisa-Politecnico through the Milan Passante railway to Milano Rogoredo. From there, it turns southwest towards its southern terminus, Pavia.

== History ==
The route was activated on 11 December 2011, to coincide with the introduction of the 2011/12 winter timetable. It replaced the S10, which was simultaneously closed down.

== Stations ==
The stations on the S13 are as follows (the stations with a coloured background are within the municipality of Milan):

Station	Opened	Interchange	Note
Milano Bovisa	1879	MXP	
Milano Lancetti	1997	Line S12	
Milano Porta Garibaldi	1963	MXP	
Milano Repubblica	1997	Line M3 Line S12	
Milano Porta Venezia	1997	Line M1 Line S12	
Milano Dateo	2002	Line S12	
Milano Porta Vittoria	2004	Line S12	
Milano Rogoredo	1862	Line M3 Line S12 Treni regionali	
Locate Triulzi	1862		
Pieve Emanuele	2013		
Villamaggiore	1862		
Certosa di Pavia	1862		
Pavia	1862	Treni regionali	

== Scheduling ==
As of 2012, S13 trains ran at half-hourly intervals between 05:30 and 23:30 Monday to Friday, and at the same intervals on Saturdays and holidays between 06:00 and 19:00.

As of 2024, trains run half-hourly every day, with frequency reduced to hourly in late evening.

== See also ==
- History of rail transport in Italy
- List of Milan suburban railway stations
- Rail transport in Italy
- Transport in Milan
