= Ospedale Niguarda Ca' Granda =

Largest and one of the most important hospitals in Milan, Italy

Coordinates: 45°30′35.9″N 9°11′9.55″E

Niguarda Ca' Granda
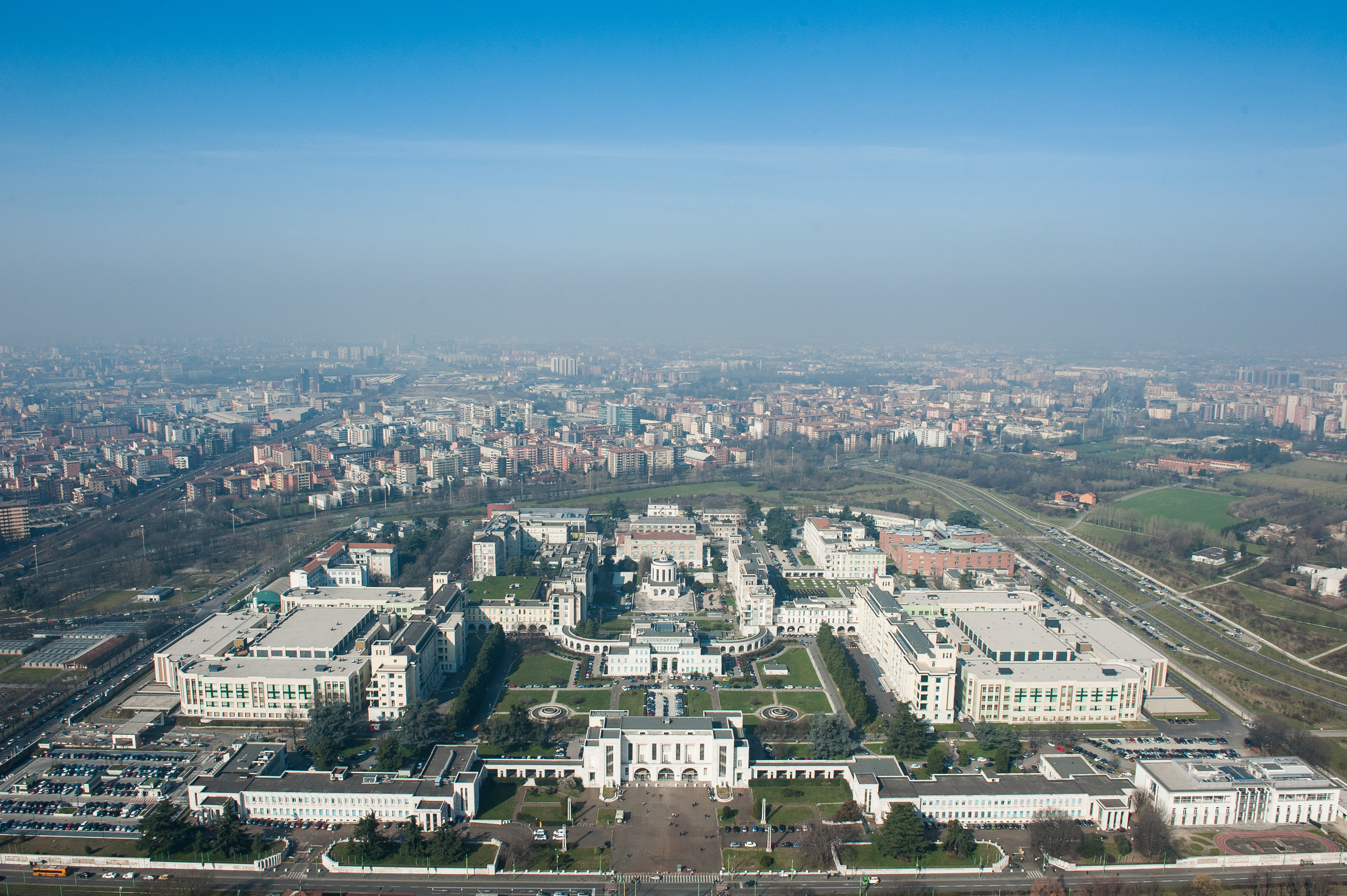

Geography
- Location: Milan, Italy

Organisation
- Type: General

History
- Opened: 1939

Links
- Website: www.ospedaleniguarda.it
- Lists: Hospitals in Italy

Grande Ospedale Metropolitano Niguarda, commonly known as Ospedale Niguarda or Niguarda Hospital, is the largest hospital in Milan, Italy, and one of the most important hospitals in the city.

In 2025, Niguarda Hospital was ranked 1st in Italy and 37th in the world in Newsweek's World's Best Hospitals 2025 list. In 2024, it was ranked 2nd in Italy and 52nd in the world; while in 2023, it was ranked 2nd in Italy and 60th in the world.

== History ==
The hospital was opened on October 3, 1939.

== See also ==
- Policlinico of Milan
- University of Milan
- International Medical School, University of Milan
- Humanitas University
