= Certosa di Pavia railway station =

Railway station in Italy

Certosa di Pavia
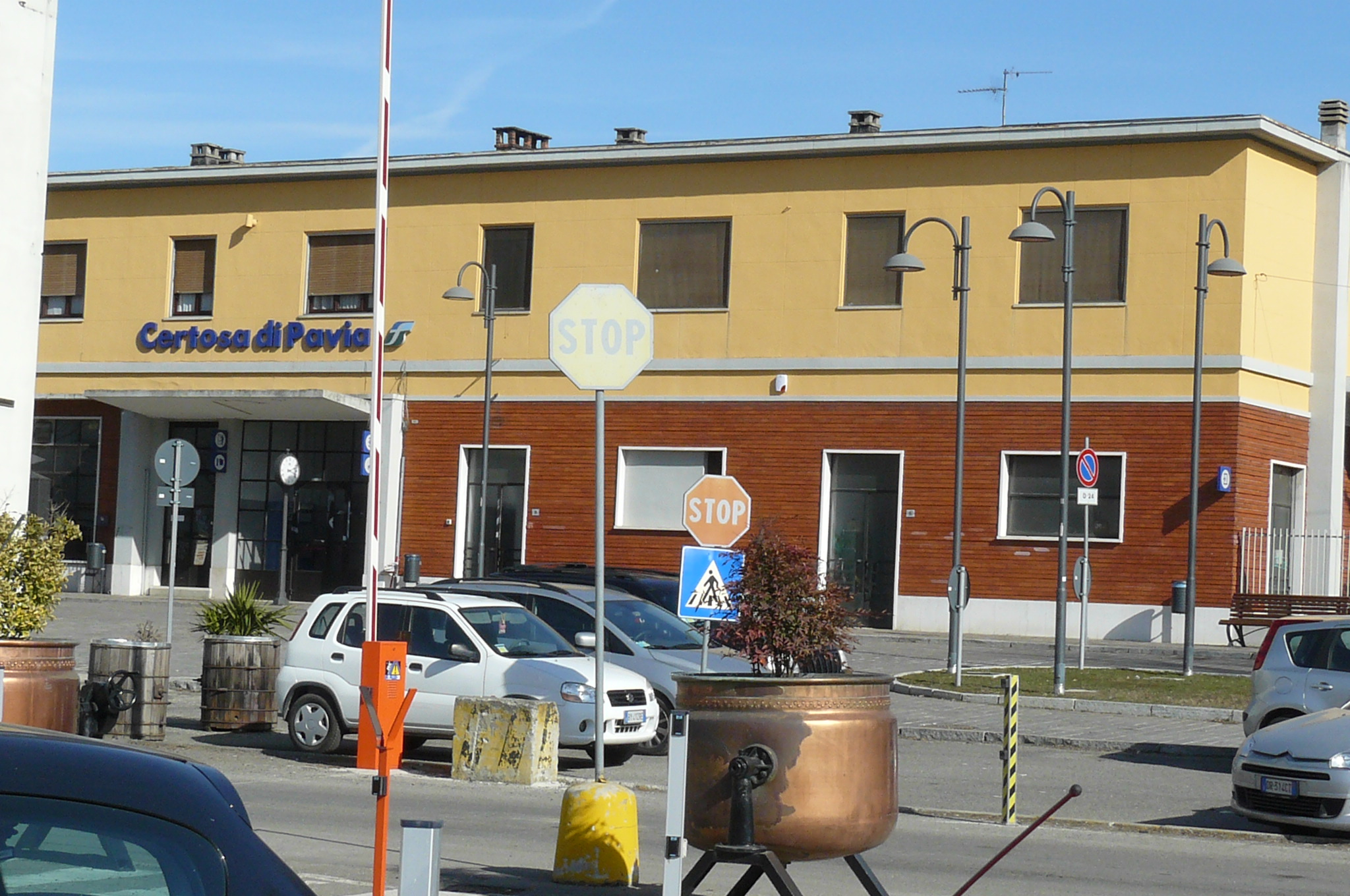

General information
- Location: Piazzale Stazione; Certosa di Pavia, Pavia, Lombardy; Italy
- Coordinates: 45°15′24″N 09°06′16″E
- Operator: Rete Ferroviaria Italiana
- Line: Milan–Genoa
- Distance: 8.208 km (5.100 mi) from Milano Rogoredo
- Train operators: Trenord

Other information
- Classification: silver

Services
Preceding station	Trenord	Following station
Villamaggiore towards Milano Bovisa	Line S13 (Milan suburban railway service)	Pavia Terminus
Location
- Location within Lombardy Location within Northern Italy Location within Italy

Certosa di Pavia railway station is a railway station in Italy. Located on the Milan–Genoa railway, it serves the municipality of Certosa di Pavia.

== Services ==
The station is served by the line S13 of Milan suburban railway network, operated by the lombard railway company Trenord.

== See also ==
- Milan suburban railway network
- Certosa di Pavia Monastery
