= International Workshop on Lung Health =

International Workshop on Lung Health is a medical association known to work specifically in the respiratory medicine domain. It is known for organizing annual conferences on recent approaches of daily clinical methodologies.

== History and Activity ==
The organization was conceived during the consensus conference held in January 2013 in Monaco, which was supported by principality of Monaco and Publi Creations. Francesco Blasi and Giorgio W. Canonica are serving as the president of the organization while Stefano Aliberti, Stefano Centanni and Tobias Welte are serving as the present chairman. The organization is known for convening annual conference and workshop for encouraging the confluence of views pertaining to different national health systems, difference clinical practices with associated culture. The conferences and workshops organized are known to receive endorsement of organizations and forums including Association Internationale pour la promotion de Formations Spécialisées en Médecine et en Sciences Biologiques (AFISM).

Year	Title	Venue	Reference
2020	7th International Workshop on Lung Health	Prague	
2019	6th International Workshop on Lung Health	Nice	
2018	5th International Workshop on Lung Health	Berlin	
2017	4th International Workshop on Lung Health	Budapest	
2016	3rd International Workshop on Lung Health	Monaco	
2015	2nd International Workshop on Lung Health	Valencia	
2013	1st International Workshop on Lung Health	Monaco	

== Notable publications ==
- Comparison of Comfort and Effectiveness of Total Face Mask and Oronasal Mask in Noninvasive Positive Pressure Ventilation in Patients with Acute Respiratory Failure: A Clinical Trial. https://doi.org/10.1155/2017/2048032
- Relationship between the presence of bronchiectasis and acute exacerbation in Thai COPD patients. https://doi.org/10.2147/COPD.S139776
- Clinical and Prognostic Characteristics of Patients with Post-chronic Thromboembolic Pulmonary Hypertension (CTEPH).
- Asthma knowledge, care, and outcome during pregnancy: The QAKCOP study. https://doi.org/10.1177/1479972318767719
- Effects of bronchodilation on biomarkers of peripheral airway inflammation in COPD. https://doi.org/10.1016/j.phrs.2018.05.010

== Footnotes ==
- Blasi, Francesco B.. Lung Diseases: Chronic Respiratory Infections. Switzerland, MDPI AG, 2018.
- Annesi-Maesano, Isabella. Respiratory Epidemiology. United Kingdom, European Respiratory Society, 2014.
- Viral Infections in Children, Volume II. Germany, Springer International Publishing, 2017. ISBN 9783319540931
- Zirpe, Kapil, et al. Critical Care Update 2019. India, Jaypee Brothers, Medical Publishers Pvt. Limited, 2019. ISBN 9789352709106
- Introduction to Bronchoscopy. United Kingdom, Cambridge University Press, 2017. ISBN 9781107449527
- Annual Update in Intensive Care and Emergency Medicine 2016. Germany, Springer International Publishing, 2016. ISBN 9783319273495
- Clinical Pulmonology. United States, Hayle Medical. ISBN 9781632413994
- Annual Update in Intensive Care and Emergency Medicine 2015. Germany, Springer International Publishing, 2015. ISBN 9783319137612
- Blasi, Francesco, and Dimopoulos, Georgios. Textbook of Respiratory & Critical Care Infection. India, Jaypee Brothers, Medical Publishers Pvt. Limited, 2014. ISBN 9789350902981
- Metabolism of Human Diseases: Organ Physiology and Pathophysiology. Austria, Springer Vienna, 2014. ISBN 9783709107157
