= Giorgio Walter Canonica =

Italian allergist and pulmonologist

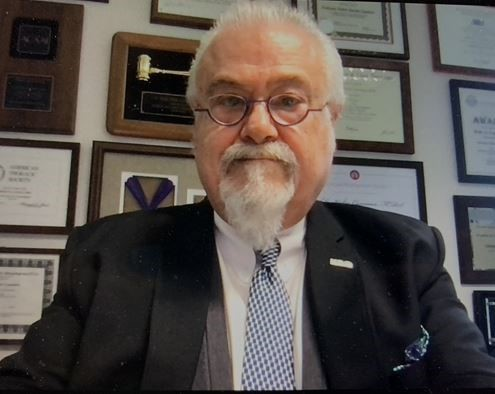
- Giorgio Walter Canonica
- Born: October 25, 1947
- Citizenship: Italian
- Education: University of Genoa, Milan, Italy
- Scientific career
- Workplaces: Medical University of South Carolina; Uppsala University; Humanitas University, Milan; World Allergy Organization; Global Asthma Association (INTERASMA)

Giorgio Walter Canonica (born October 25, 1947) is an Italian allergist, pulmonologist and professor of respiratory medicine at Humanitas University, Milan, Italy and Director Personalized Medicine Asthma & Allergy Center at Humanitas Research Hospital IRCCS-Milano Italy since December 2016. He is known for his research work related to treatment strategies for allergic diseases which includes biological response modifier in form of targeted immunotherapy with primary emphasis on sublingual immunotherapy (SLIT). He was president of several allergy and respiratory scientific cocieties.

== Early life and education ==
Canonica received his master's degree from School of Medicine, University of Genoa during 1972. He started his career as a specialist in pulmonary disease at University of Genoa. He then moved to Florence University while keeping the primary specialization in Allergy and Clinical Immunology. Consequently, he carried out research works in clinical immunology and allergology research from University of Uppsala, Sweden and Medical University of South Carolina, Charleston, US.

== Career ==
Canonica returned to Genoa University in 1995 and had different positions including the full professor Internal Medicine and Pulmonary Medicine, Director of the Speciality School of Allergy and Clinical Immunology, Director of the Specialty School of Pulmonary Diseases, Chairman of the Department of Medical Specialties (University Hospital San Martino Genoa, Italy). In 2016 he moved to Humanitas University and Research Hospital in Milan. As per national and international awards and recognition obtained, in 2004 Canonica received the title of Visitante Distinguido from Università Catolica Cordoba Argentina. Later on, in 2012, he won the WAO Gold Medal Award. In 2014, he received the Laurea Honoris Causa, Cluji Medical University, Romania. He also received the Special Recognition Award from WAO in 2019. He is also editor in chief of Current Opinion in Allergy and Clinical Immunology.

In 2020, he obtained the Scientific Recognition Award APAAACI-Asian Pacific Association Allergy. He was declared Legend of Allergy and Immunology in 2021. In 2022, he obtained the Lifetime Achievement Award – APAACI-Asian Pacific Association Allergy Clinical Immunology in Manila. Another Lifetime Achievement Award was obtained in 2023 from the WAO World Allergy Organization, in Dubai.

Throughout his career, Canonica has was President of several international and national associations. He chaired the World Allergy Organization (WAO) from 2007 to 2009; he was president for Interasma-Global Asthma Association from 2018 to 2020. He was President of the Respiratory Effectiveness Group (REG) from 2022 to 2024, continuing his research activities on the effectiveness of respiratory treatments.

At the national level, Canonica has held positions as President of the Italian Society of Allergology, Asthma, and Clinical Immunology (SIAAIC), and the Italian Society of Respiratory Medicine (SIMER), known as SIP/IRS. He was also involved in the Collegium Internationale Allergologicum (CIA) as a board member from 2021 to 2023. This position made him contribute to international collaboration and knowledge exchange in the field of allergology. Currently, Professor Canonica is an executive member and consultant in many important international initiatives and networks: Member of the executive committee of the Allergic Rhinitis and its Impact on Asthma (ARIA), and the Global Allergy & Asthma Excellence Network (GA²LEN), Canonica is also Chief Executive Director of Interasma since 2021.

Canonica has made significant contributions as Chair of the Methodology Committee at the EAACI since 2019, and as Chair of Biologics in Allergy at WAO from 2023 to 2024, leading important initiatives in research and therapeutic innovation. His involvement as an International Advocate at the Global Asthma Initiative (GINA) has contributed to the promotion of best clinical practices and awareness about asthma management globally.

He has served as president of the International Workshop on Lung Health.

Furthermore, Canonica is honored as an Honorary Member of several societies, including the Argentine Society of Allergology, the Latin American Society of Allergy and Immunology (SLAAI), the Finnish Society of Allergy and Immunology, the Hungarian Allergy Society, the Romanian Allergy Society, and the Italian Association of Nasal Cytology (AICNA).

He is also recognized as a Fellow of organizations such as the American Academy of Allergy Asthma and Immunology (AAAAI), the European Respiratory Society (ERS), the European Academy of Allergy and Clinical Immunology (EAACI), the American College of Allergy Asthma and Immunology (ACAAI), and the American College of Chest Physicians (ACCP).

== Research areas ==
Canonica's research areas primarily include the observations of molecular events, which further includes interactivity of epithelial cells, inflammatory cells and immunocompetent cells in allergic inflammation and airway remodeling. He is also known to be involved in innovative treatment strategies for allergic diseases including biological response modifier in form of targeted immunotherapy with primary emphasis on sublingual immunotherapy (SLIT).

== Notable publications ==
- Zuberbier, T.; Aberer, W.; Asero, R.; Abdul Latiff, A. H.; Baker, D.; Ballmer-Weber, B.; Bernstein, J. A.; Bindslev-Jensen, C.; Brzoza, Z.; Buense Bedrikow, R.; Canonica, G. W.; Church, M. K.; Craig, T.; Danilycheva, I. V.; Dressler, C.; Ensina, L. F.; Giménez-Arnau, A.; Godse, K.; Gonçalo, M.; Grattan, C.; Hebert, J.; Hide, M.; Kaplan, A.; Kapp, A.; Katelaris, C. H.; Kocatürk, E.; Kulthanan, K.; Larenas-Linnemann, D.; Leslie, T. A.; Magerl, M.; Mathelier-Fusade, P.; Meshkova, R. Y.; Metz, M.; Nast, A.; Nettis, E.; Oude-Elberink, H.; Rosumeck, S.; Saini, S. S.; Sánchez-Borges, M.; Schmid-Grendelmeier, P.; Staubach, P.; Sussman, G.; Toubi, E.; Vena, G. A.; Vestergaard, C.; Wedi, B.; Werner, R. N.; Zhao, Z.; Maurer, M. (July 2018). "The EAACI/GA²LEN/EDF/WAO guideline for the definition, classification, diagnosis and management of urticaria". Allergy. 73 (7): 1393–1414. doi:10.1111/all.13397. hdl:10230/35554. PMID 29336054.
- Brożek, Jan L.; Bousquet, Jean; Baena-Cagnani, Carlos E.; Bonini, Sergio; Canonica, G. Walter; Casale, Thomas B.; van Wijk, Roy Gerth; Ohta, Ken; Zuberbier, Torsten; Schünemann, Holger J. (September 2010). "Allergic Rhinitis and its Impact on Asthma (ARIA) guidelines: 2010 Revision" (PDF). Journal of Allergy and Clinical Immunology. 126 (3): 466–476. doi:10.1016/j.jaci.2010.06.047. hdl:1822/49100. PMID 20816182. S2CID 536060.
- Canonica, G. W.; Baena-Cagnani, C. E.; Bousquet, J.; Bousquet, P. J.; Lockey, R. F.; Malling, H.-J.; Passalacqua, G.; Potter, P.; Valovirta, E. (8 February 2007). "Recommendations for standardization of clinical trials with Allergen Specific Immunotherapy for respiratory allergy. A statement of a World Allergy Organization (WAO) taskforce: Recommendations for immunotherapy clinical trials". Allergy. 62 (3): 317–324. doi:10.1111/j.1398-9995.2006.01312.x. PMID 17298350. S2CID 16237704.
