= International Medical School, University of Milan =

Medical school in Italy

International Medical School (IMS)
- Type: State university
- Established: 2014
- Parent institution: University of Milan (UNIMI)
- Location: Milan, Italy
- Campus: Laboratorio Interdisciplinare Tecnologie Avanzate (LITA) (administrative headquarters and classrooms), Segrate; Niguarda Hospital (clerkship for 3rd-6th years; classrooms for 3rd-5th year)
- Language: English (lectures), Italian (clerkships)
- Programme Coordinator: Prof. Anna Marozzi
- Nickname: IMS UNIMI
- Website: ims.cdl.unimi.it/en www.unimi.it/en/education/single-cycle-master/international-medical-school-ims

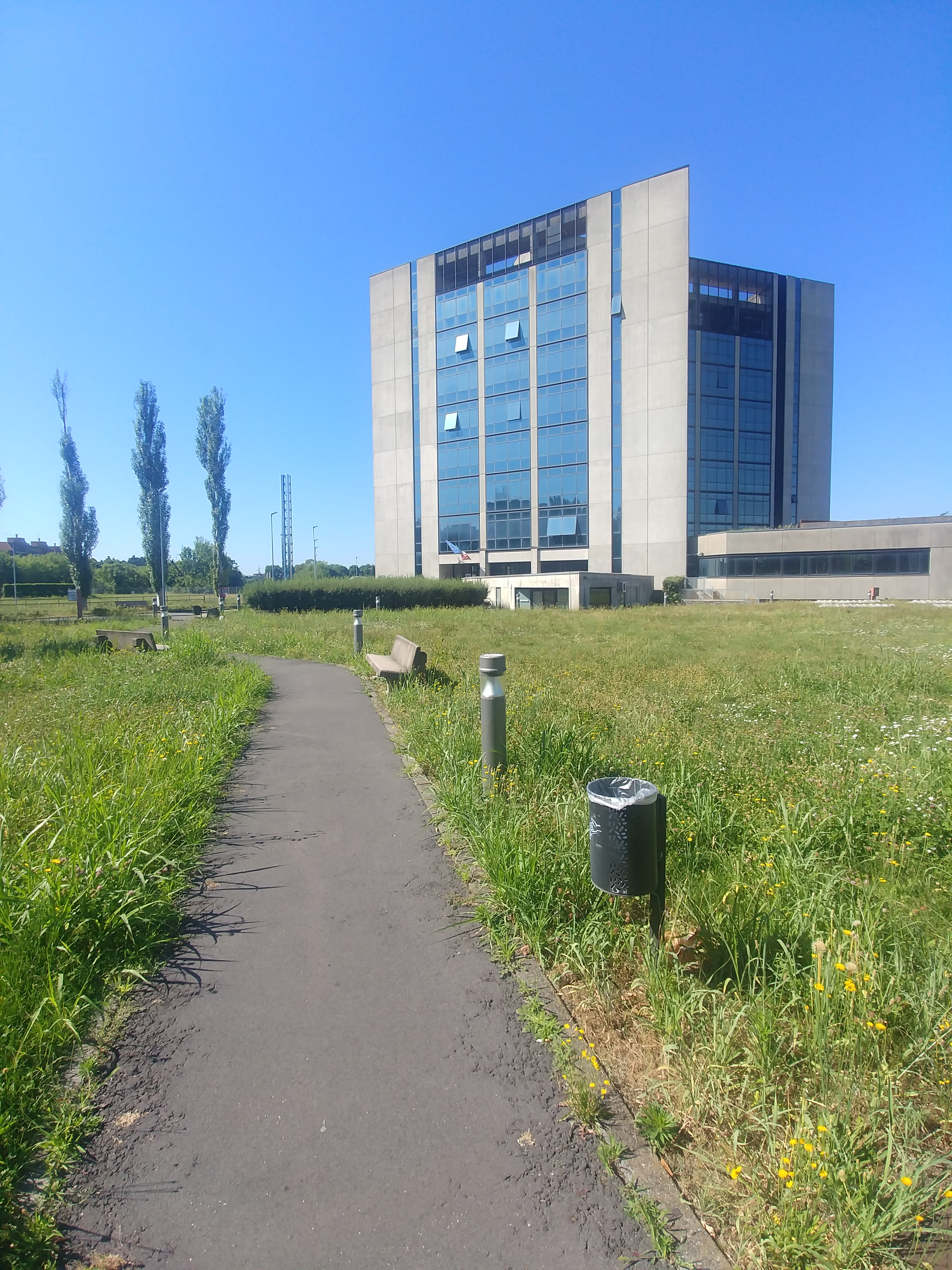
LITA Building, 2021

The International Medical School (IMS) of the faculty of medicine of the University of Milan is a public English-language medical school located primarily in Milan and neighboring Segrate, Italy, with other teaching clinics in the Milan metropolitan area. The school is officially recognized on the United Nations World Directory of Medical Schools.

It is consistently ranked as one of the top 100 medical schools in the world and is consistently 1st in Italy among rankings like Leiden, and QS. In 2026 the University of Milan ranked 1st in Italy and 65th in the world in the field of Medicine according to the QS World University Rankings. According to the global rankings of the USNWR in 2025, the University of Milan ranked 15th in the world in Gastroenterology and Hepatology, 43rd in Oncology, 53rd in Surgery, Pharmacology and Toxicology, 54th in Clinical medicine, 64th in Radiology, Nuclear medicine and Medical imaging, 68th in Cardiology and Cardiovascular systems, 77th in Infectious diseases, 78th in Endocrinology and Metabolism, 80th in Neuroscience and Behavioural sciences, and 98th in Immunology.

The school's mission is to "provide graduates with both a solid, up-to-date scientific understanding of medicine, and a deep appreciation of the human and social complexities associated with health and disease.”

== History ==
The course was founded in 2010 as "MiMed" in Humanitas Hospital, as a combined effort of the University of Milan and the hospital. In 2014 the hospital opened its own private course, thus the university renamed the course as "International Medical School" and relocated it in L.I.T.A. (Laboratorio Interdisciplinare Tecnologie Avanzate) building in Segrate.

== Admissions ==
Admission to the school is dependent on a high score on the International Medical Admissions Test. Only the top 2% of test takers are admitted into the program. One-third of seats are reserved for students who are not citizens of Italy and the European Union, nor certain affiliated countries, such as Switzerland and Norway. Among the incoming class of 2015, less than half the students were Italian citizens. The minimum International Medical Admissions Test score for first-round entry among Italian and EU-applicants was 50.1, representing approximately the top 2% of test-takers.

For non-EU citizens, the admission system is highly restrictive as candidates are limited to applying to only one medical school. In conjunction, there are only 15 available seats and the highest cut-off, making it the most brutal and competitive programs among Italian medical schools."International Medical School".

== Curriculum ==
The school has a six-year program. The curriculum is block/module based rather than course based, following a similar format as American and Canadian Medical Schools. The first two years are dedicated to pre-clinical studies, focusing on anatomy, physiology, biochemistry, and microbiology. The following four years are clinical, with frequent rotations in different medical and surgical departments in hospitals. The school emphasizes problem-based learning, interdisciplinarity, and translational medicine. Students have the opportunity to do part of their education abroad via the Erasmus Programme. All teaching is in English. Students are required to learn Italian, and, in order to be graduated, they must write and defend a final thesis in English. The degree granted is a Dottore magistrale, styled in English as a Doctor of Medicine.

== Activities ==
The first two years are mostly held in L.I.T.A, being considered "preclinical". Besides lectures, activities (e.g. Problem-Based Learning, classes with anatomical models, spirometry tests etc.) are provided to improve knowledge of critical topics. From the third year onwards the students alternate between lectures and practical clinical learning in hospitals.

== Affiliate hospitals ==
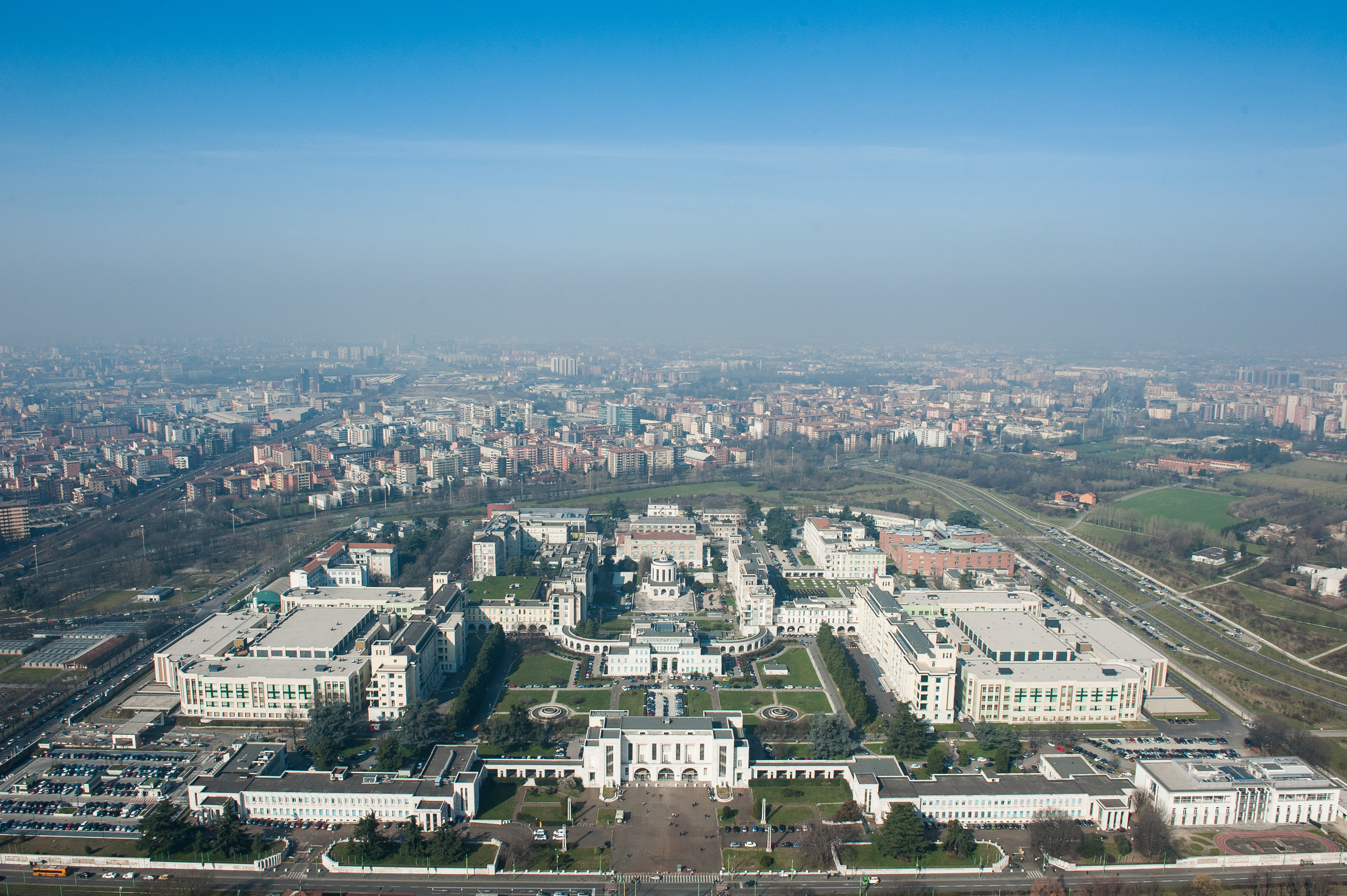
Ospedale Niguarda Ca' Granda in Milan, Italy

Among the school's teaching hospitals, there are:

- Ospedale Niguarda Ca' Granda – piazza dell'Ospedale Maggiore, 3 – Milan
- Fondazione IRCCS Ca' Granda Ospedale Maggiore Policlinico – via Francesco Sforza, 35 – Milan
- Ospedale Luigi Sacco – via Giovanni Battista Grassi, 74 – Milan
- IRCCS Centro Cardiologico Monzino – via Privata Carlo Parea, 4 – Milan
- Azienda Ospedaliera San Paolo – via Antonio di Rudinì, 8 – Milan
- Ospedale San Carlo Borromeo – via Pio II, 3 – Milan
- Presidio Ospedaliero Gaetano Pini – via Gaetano Pini, 3 (piazza Cardinale Andrea Ferrari, 1) – Milan
- Fondazione IRCCS Istituto Nazionale dei Tumori - via Giacomo Venezian, 1 – Milan
- CAMPUS IFOM-IEO (Istituto Europeo di Oncologia) - via Adamello, 16 – Milan
- IRCCS Istituto Ortopedico Galeazzi – via R. Galeazzi, 4 – Milan
- IRCCS Policlinico San Donato – via Morandi, 30 – San Donato Milanese
- Ospedale San Giuseppe – via S. Vittore, 12 – Milan

== See also ==
- University of Milan
- Vita-Salute San Raffaele University
- Humanitas University
