= Guido Torzilli =

Italian liver surgeon from Milan

- Born: Guido Torzilli; 29 November 1962 (age 63); Milan, Italy
- Medical career
- Profession: Surgeon
- Institutions: University of Milan; University of Tokyo; Humanitas research hospital
- Sub-specialties: Hepatobiliary surgery

Guido Torzilli is an Italian liver surgeon from Milan, known for his surgical and scientific activities in the field of precision surgery for malignant liver tumors.

== Education and career ==
Torzilli was admitted to the Medical Faculty of the University of Milan and completed his studies with the predicate summa cum laude. In the following years, he specialized in General Surgery at the same institution until 1993. For his PhD Program he moved to Japan, at the University of Tokyo, as a fellow of the Japanese Foundation for Promotion of Cancer Research. There he reached the position of assistant professor. After four years in the hepatobiliary surgical unit of the Hospital of Lodi, he returned to his Alma mater und became head of the Liver Surgery Section at the University of Milan. During this time he was also active in Radiology Education for Residents at the University of Pavia and in several other medical specialties in other Italian universities. Since 2006 he has been leading the Liver Surgery Department of the Humanitas Research Hospital.

=== Scientific and surgical activities ===
Torzilli had published more than 200 scientific articles, had edited two books and had written more than 50 chapters in medical books (2016). According to Google Scholar, in 2020 his publications has been cited 11,624 times. His interest in intraoperative ultrasound examination of the liver and its vascular structures led to the development of several novel techniques, such as liver tunneling, minimesohepatectomy and the upper transverse liver resection. He has been driven be the conviction, that a tailored liver surgery for malignant tumors should have the secondary goal of sparing parenchymal volume as well as the vascular skeleton of the liver. The overall strategy he dedicated much of his research and surgical activities to, has become known as parenchymal sparing liver surgery.
