= Francesco Blasi =

Italian medical scientist

- Born: November 18, 1959
- Citizenship: Italian
- Education: University of Milan
- Scientific career
- Workplaces: University of Milan; European Registry of Bronchiectasis; European Respiratory Society; Italian Respiratory Society

Francesco Bruno Blasi (born 18 November 1959) is an Italian medical scientist and professor. His domain of research is respiratory medicine. He has been the president of European Respiratory Society (ERS) during 2012–13. He has served as the president of Italian Respiratory Society during 2015–17. He is presently serving as one of the board of directors of University of Milan and is the professor of respiratory medicine in department pathophysiology and transplantation in University of Milan.

== Early life and education ==
Blasi received the MD degree from University of Milan in 1984. He carried out specialization in Cardiology and Respiratory Diseases from the same University during 1987 and 1997 respectively. He carried out his PhD in Respiratory Diseases from the University of Milan in 1991.

== Research area ==
Blasi is known for his work in the domain of immunology, bronchitis, pneumonia, cystic fibrosis, COPD, tuberculosis, lung transplantation etc. His research area includes the effects of atypical bacterial infection in the immunity at cellular level in the chronic case of bronchitis. He also known for working on the effects of antibiotics on Chronic obstructive pulmonary disease (COPD) and the for finding the roles of viral infection and atypical bacteria in the case of asthma onset.

== Associations ==
Blasi has been nominated as the chair of scientific committee of World Bronchiectasis Conference in 2017. He has been the founder member of European Registry of Bronchiectasis (EMBARC), Italian Bronchiectasis Registry (IRIDE) and Italian NTM Registry. He has served as head of cardiothoracic unit (IRCCS) at Policlinico of Milan. He has been the vice-president of European Respiratory Society (ERS) till 2011 and served as president during 2012–13. He has served as the president of Italian Respiratory Society during 2015–17. Besides being the professor of respiratory medicine, he is also a board of directors of University of Milan.

He has served as president of the International Workshop on Lung Health.

== Books authored ==
- Francesco, Blasi (2015). Textbook of Respiratory & Critical Care Infection. Dimopoulos George. DL: Jaypee Brothers, Medical Publishers. ISBN 978-93-86107-71-8. OCLC 1064743478.
- Allegra, L. (2013). MALATTIE RESPIRATORIE. F. Blasi, G. W. Canonica, S. Centanni, G. Girbino. London: Elsevier Health Sciences Italy. ISBN 978-88-214-3305-4. OCLC 882778181.
- Antibiotics and the lung. M. Cazzola, Francesco Blasi, S. Ewig, European Respiratory Society. Sheffield, UK: European Respiratory Society Journals. 2004. ISBN 978-1-904097-32-7. OCLC 56565332.
- Chlamydia pneumoniae infection. Luigi Allegra, F. Blasi. Berlin: Springer. 1995. ISBN 978-88-470-2201-0. OCLC 605246689.

== Bibliography ==
=== Notable publications ===
- Guidelines for the management of adult lower respiratory tract infections, 2011, https://doi.org/10.1111/j.1469-0691.2011.03672.x
- Confalonieri, Marco; Urbino, Rosario; Potena, Alfredo; Piattella, Marco; Parigi, Piercarlo; Puccio, Giacomo; Della Porta, Rossana; Giorgio, Carbone; Blasi, Francesco; Umberger, Reba; Meduri, G. Umberto (2005-02-01). "Hydrocortisone Infusion for Severe Community-acquired Pneumonia". American Journal of Respiratory and Critical Care Medicine. 171 (3): 242–248. doi:10.1164/rccm.200406-808OC. hdl:11368/2950957. ISSN 1073-449X. PMID 15557131.
- Lönnroth, Knut; Migliori, Giovanni Battista; Abubakar, Ibrahim; D'Ambrosio, Lia; Vries, Gerard de; Diel, Roland; Douglas, Paul; Falzon, Dennis; Gaudreau, Marc-Andre; Goletti, Delia; Ochoa, Edilberto R. González (2015-04-01). "Towards tuberculosis elimination: an action framework for low-incidence countries". European Respiratory Journal. 45 (4): 928–952. doi:10.1183/09031936.00214014. ISSN 0903-1936. PMC 4391660. PMID 25792630.
- Marco, Fabiano Di; Verga, Massimo; Reggente, Manuela; Casanova, Francesca Maria; Santus, Pierachille; Blasi, Francesco; Allegra, Luigi; Centanni, Stefano (2006-10-01). "Anxiety and depression in COPD patients: The roles of gender and disease severity". Respiratory Medicine. 100 (10): 1767–1774. doi:10.1016/j.rmed.2006.01.026. ISSN 0954-6111. PMID 16531031.
- Stoppelli, M P; Corti, A; Soffientini, A; Cassani, G; Blasi, F; Assoian, R K (1985). "Differentiation-enhanced binding of the amino-terminal fragment of human urokinase plasminogen activator to a specific receptor on U937 monocytes". Proceedings of the National Academy of Sciences. 82 (15): 4939–4943. Bibcode:1985PNAS...82.4939S. doi:10.1073/pnas.82.15.4939. ISSN 0027-8424. PMC 390473. PMID 2991901.
- Torres, Antoni; Peetermans, Willy E.; Viegi, Giovanni; Blasi, Francesco (2013-11-01). "Risk factors for community-acquired pneumonia in adults in Europe: a literature review". Thorax. 68 (11): 1057–1065. doi:10.1136/thoraxjnl-2013-204282. ISSN 0040-6376. PMC 3812874. PMID 24130229.
- Polverino, Eva; Goeminne, Pieter C.; McDonnell, Melissa J.; Aliberti, Stefano; Marshall, Sara E.; Loebinger, Michael R.; Murris, Marlene; Cantón, Rafael; Torres, Antoni; Dimakou, Katerina; Soyza, Anthony De (2017-09-01). "European Respiratory Society guidelines for the management of adult bronchiectasis". European Respiratory Journal. 50 (3). doi:10.1183/13993003.00629-2017. ISSN 0903-1936. PMID 28889110. S2CID 21772674.
- Sozzi, Fabiola B.; Belmonte, Marta; Schiavone, Marco; Canetta, Ciro; Blasi, Francesco (2020). "Considerations on cardiac patients during Covid-19 outbreak". Echocardiography. 37 (8): 1321–1322. doi:10.1111/echo.14790. ISSN 0742-2822. PMC 7404830. PMID 32654172.
- Group, The Severe Covid-19 GWAS (2020-06-17). "Genomewide Association Study of Severe Covid-19 with Respiratory Failure". New England Journal of Medicine. 383 (16): 1522–1534. doi:10.1056/NEJMoa2020283. PMC 7315890. PMID 32558485.
- Blasi, Francesco; Barnes, Peter J.; Gaga, Mina; Migliori, Giovanni Battista (2013-10-01). "Future directions for the ERS: Presidential plans". European Respiratory Journal. 42 (4): 875–880. doi:10.1183/09031936.00114513. ISSN 0903-1936. PMID 24081751. S2CID 13137396.
- Puggioni, Francesca; Brussino, Luisa; Canonica, Giorgio Walter; Blasi, Francesco; Paggiaro, Pierluigi; Caminati, Marco; Latorre, Manuela; Heffler, Enrico; Senna, Gianenrico (2020-11-10). "Frequency of Tiotropium Bromide Use and Clinical Features of Patients with Severe Asthma in a Real-Life Setting: Data from the Severe Asthma Network in Italy (SANI) Registry". Journal of Asthma and Allergy. 13: 599–604. doi:10.2147/JAA.S274245. PMC 7667506. PMID 33204116.

=== Additional sources ===
- Annesi-Maesano, Isabella. Respiratory Epidemiology. United Kingdom: European Respiratory Society, 2014.
- Blasi, Francesco B.. Lung Diseases: Chronic Respiratory Infections. Switzerland: MDPI AG, 2018.
- Bronchiectasis. United Kingdom: European Respiratory Society, 2018.
- Palange, Paolo., Rohde, Gernot. ERS Handbook of Respiratory Medicine. United Kingdom: European Respiratory Society, 2019.
- Vijayan, Vannan K., Jindal, Surinder K. World Clinics: Pulmonary & Critical Care Medicine - Chronic Obstructive Pulmonary Disease. India: Jaypee Brothers, Medical Publishers Pvt. Limited, 2013.
- Woodhead, Mark., Torres, Antoni., Mandell, Lionel., Ewig, Santiago. Respiratory Infections. United Kingdom: CRC Press, 2006.
- Menendez, Rosario. Community-Acquired Pneumonia: Strategies for Management. Germany: Wiley, 2008.
- Leeper, Kenneth V.. Severe Community Acquired Pneumonia. Germany: Springer US, 2013.
- Webb, Andrew. Oxford Textbook of Critical Care. United Kingdom: Oxford University Press, 2016.
