= Castle of Tolcinasco =

Castle in Lombardy, Italy

Coordinates: 45.364064°N 9.186809°E

- Castello di Tolcinasco
- Tolcinasco, frazione of Pieve Emanuele, Italy

Site information
- Type: Castle
- Owner: Privately owned
- Open to the public: Yes
- Condition: Restored in 2018

Site history
- Built: 16th century
- In use: 16th century to 17th century
- Materials: Bricks, stone and wood

The Castle of Tolcinasco (Italian: Castello di Tolcinasco) is a 16th century fortification located in Lombardy, Italy, more precisely in Tolcinasco, frazione of the comune of Pieve Emanuele. Built by the House of Adda, it can be defined as an heavily fortified farmhouse due to the fact that it was the building from which the country nearby could be defended and because it was also the depot where farming supplies and harvest from the crops was held. As of today, the castle is a privately owned structure which has been turned into a golf resort and spa.
