= Pieve Emanuele =

- Comune
- Comune di Pieve Emanuele
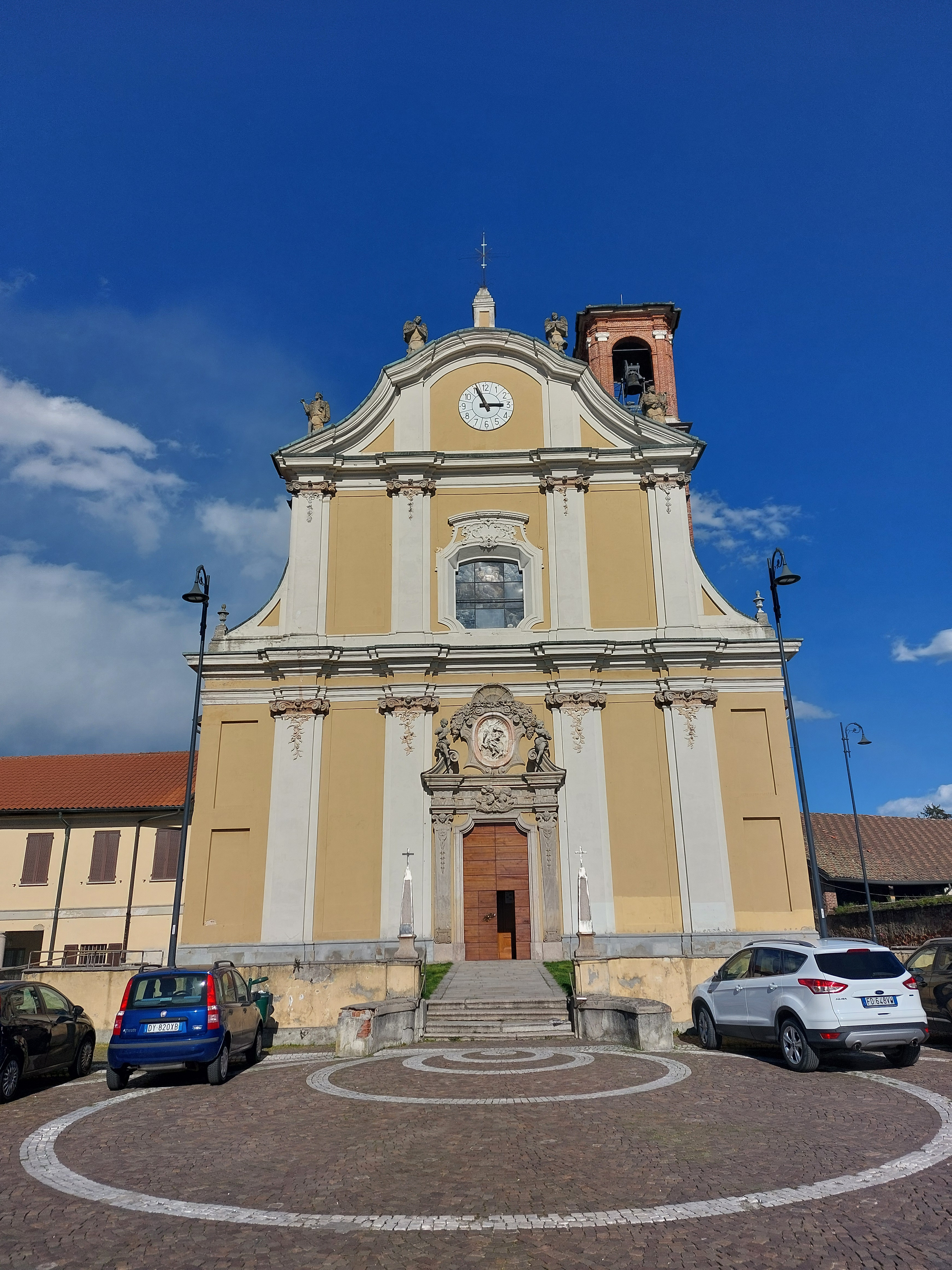
- The Church of Sant'Alessandro, main church of the comune.

- Flag Coat of arms

- Pieve Emanuele within the Metropolitan City of Milan.

- Location of Pieve Emanuele in Italy Pieve Emanuele (Lombardy)
- Coordinates: 45°21′N 9°12′E
- Country: Italy
- Region: Lombardy
- Metropolitan city: Milan
- Frazioni: Fizzonasco, Tolcinasco, Pizzabrasa

Government
  - Mayor: Pierluigi Costanzo

Area
  - Total: 13 km^{2} (5.0 sq mi)
- Elevation: 97 m (318 ft)

Population (30 June 2025)
  - Total: 15,876
  - Density: 1,200/km^{2} (3,200/sq mi)
- Demonym: Pievesi
- Time zone: UTC+1 (CET)
  - Summer (DST): UTC+2 (CEST)
- Postal code: 20072
- Dialing code: 02
- ISTAT code: 015173
- Patron saint: Saint Alexander of Bergamo
- Website: Official website

Pieve Emanuele (Lombard: Piev [ˈpjeːf]) is a comune (municipality) of 15,876 inhabitants in the Italian region of Lombardy, located about 13 kilometres (8 mi) south of Milan, and about 20 kilometres (12 mi) north of Pavia. It is located inside of the Parco Agricolo Sud Milano.

The Lambro meridionale flows through the comune's territory, and its erosive action has created the Valle delle Volpi (English: Valley of the Foxes), which is located entirely in the town's territory. Pieve Emanuele is also lapped by the river Olona. The great presence of water made the construction of a network of artificial canals possible, thus causing the great development of agricultural activity in the area.

== Geography ==
Pieve Emanuele is 12 kilometers (7.4 miles) distant from the center of Milan in a straight line, and it is located in the area known as Bassa pianura lombarda, in english Lower lombard plain. Alongside Locate di Triulzi and Lacchiarella, Pieve Emanuele is one of the three last comuni of the southern part of the metropolitan city, bordering the Province of Pavia, whose capital, Pavia, is at a distance of 15 kilometers (9,3 miles) from Pieve Emanuele itself.

The elevation of the town varies in a range between 70 meters and 100 meters. Within Pieve Emanuele's territory is located the lowest point of the whole Metropolitan City of Milan.

== Monuments and main sights ==
- Church of Sant'Alessandro, dedicated to the patron saint Alexander of Bergamo. It was built at the end of the 17th century. The Church is seat of the parish already in charge of the pieve of Locate, and it is part of the Archdiocese of Milan and of the Deanery of Rozzano.

== Infrastructure and transport ==
The comune is near various Strade Provinciali (in english provincial roads) that lead to the nearby comuni in the Pavese and the Parco Agricolo Sud Milano.

Pieve Emanuele is served by its own railway station, located on the Milan–Genoa railway, through which passes the S13 line.

There are also bus lines managed by Autoguidovie for Azienda Trasporti Milanesi, connecting Pieve Emanuele to the various other towns within the outskirts of Milan.

== Sport ==
=== Sports clubs ===
==== Football ====
- A.S.D Valentino Mazzola Calcio Pieve Emanuele (ex Polisportiva Pievese, then A.S. Pieve Emanuele from 2003 to the 2010-11 season).
- A.S.D. Devils (in the frazione Fizzonasco).
- G.S. Sant'Alessandro (not existent anymore).

==== Table tennis ====
- A.S. Pieve Emanuele - the town's tabletennis club has won various national titles from 2004 to 2007.

==== Swimming ====
- Scuola Nuoto Federale recognized by FIN

==== Karate ====
- A.S.D. Japan Karate Nakayama

==== Sport of athletics ====
- Atletica Pievese

== Administration ==
Since 1945, the elected local government of Pieve Emanuele had always been left-wing, until 2007: that year, the election of Rocco Pinto, candidate with the centre-right party House of Freedoms won the election. Here is a list of all the mayors since 1994 to 2025:

Mayor	Term start	Term end	Party	Sources
Umberto Franco	1994	1998	PDS	
Francesco Argeri	1998	2007	Civic list affiliated with the Democratic Party	
Rocco Pinto	2007	2012	Civic list affiliated with the party House of Freedoms	
Paolo Festa	2012	2022	PD	
Pierluigi Costanzo	2022	Incumbent	Civic List SiAMO Pieve Emanuele	

== Society ==
=== Demographic evolution ===
- 180 inhabitants in 1751
- 408 inhabitants in 1805
- 1033 inhabitants in 1809 after the annexation of Tolcinasco, Fizzonasco and Pizzabrasa
- annexation to Basiglio in 1811
- 1095 inhabitants in 1853 after the annexation of Tolcinasco, Fizzonasco and Pizzabrasa

=== Foreigners and other ethnicities ===
According to ISTAT, as of January 2017 the 11% of Pieve Emanuele's populationwas made of foreigners residing in the metropolitan comune. The main foreign nationalities whose representing was based to the percentual they were of the whole population were, as of 2017:

- Romania 316
- Ecuador 188
- Peru 182
- Albania 125
- China 89
- Sri Lanka 84
- Philippines 83
- Morocco 74
- Egypt 70
- Ucraina 56

== International relations ==
Pieve Emanuele is twinned with:

- Zimnicea, Romania
- Attard, Malta

== See also ==
- Castello di Tosinasco, Pieve Emanuele
