= Pavia–Stradella railway =

Railway line in Italy

Overview
- Status: In use
- Owner: RFI
- Locale: Lombardy, Italy
- Termini: Pavia; Stradella

Service
- Type: Heavy rail
- Operator(s): Trenord

History
- Opened: 1882

Technical
- Line length: 35 km (22 mi)
- Track gauge: 1,435 mm (4 ft 8 1/2 in) standard gauge
- Electrification: 3 kV DC overhead line

The Pavia–Stradella railway is a railway line in Lombardy, Italy. It was opened in 1882

== See also ==
- List of railway lines in Italy
