= Eupithecia canonica =

Scientific classification
- Kingdom: Animalia
- Phylum: Arthropoda
- Clade: Pancrustacea
- Class: Insecta
- Order: Lepidoptera
- Family: Geometridae
- Genus: Eupithecia
- Species: E. canonica

Binomial name
- Eupithecia canonica Prout, 1916

Species of moth

Eupithecia canonica is a moth in the family Geometridae. It is found in Peru.

The wingspan is about 26 mm for males. The forewings are violet grey, with dark fuscous irroration. The hindwings are dirty whitish, becoming greyer at the distal margin.
