= Humanitas University =

Italian private university

Coordinates: 45.3721°N 9.1694°E

- Università Humanitas
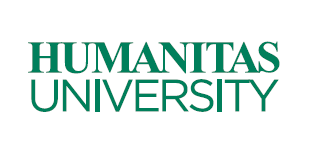
- Other name: Hunimed
- Type: Private
- Established: 20 June 2014
- Affiliations: Humanitas Research Hospital (Istituto clinico Humanitas)
- President: Gianfelice Rocca
- Rector: Luigi Maria Terracciano
- Faculty: 281
- Students: 2701
- Location: Pieve Emanuele, Bergamo, Castellanza, Catania, and Rozzano, Italy
- Colours: Green
- Website: www.hunimed.eu

Humanitas University, also recognized as Hunimed, is an Italian international private university dedicated to medical and biomedical sciences. Located within the municipality of Pieve Emanuele, a constituent of the Metropolitan City of Milan, the university's campus seamlessly integrates with the adjacent Humanitas Research Hospital Campus.

== History ==
Since 1997, an agreement with the Faculty of Medicine and Surgery at the University of Milan has facilitated a collaboration for the teaching activities of medical students within the Humanitas Research Hospital. Subsequently, degree courses in nursing and medicine were initiated, in 2000 and 2003, respectively.

In 2010, the International Medicine and Surgery Degree Program, delivered in the English language, was established at Humanitas in conjunction with the University of Milan.

In 2014, the Humanitas Research Hospital and the Humanitas Foundation for Research jointly advocated for the establishment of Humanitas University. This private institution, dedicated to life sciences, received legal recognition from the Italian Ministry of Education on June 20, 2014.

In 2016, the university launched a bachelor's degree program in Physiotherapy, and the following year marked the completion of the new university campus (buildings A, B, and C), situated adjacent to the Humanitas Research Hospital.

In 2018, the Mario Luzzatto Student House (building D) was inaugurated, offering accommodation for 240 students as a new university residence. Additionally, the following year saw the completion of the Humanitas Congress Center.

In 2019, a collaboration between Humanitas University and the Polytechnic University of Milan led to the establishment of the MEDTEC School, which offers a master's degree program in medicine and biomedical engineering. The following year witnessed the initiation of the master's degree program in nursing and midwifery, further expanding the educational offerings of the University.

The year 2023 marked the inauguration of the Innovation Building (Building F) and the commencement of bachelor's degree programs in Biomedical Laboratory Techniques, as well as Imaging and Radiotherapy Techniques.

In 2024, Humanitas University and Bocconi University jointly established a master's degree program in Data Analytics and Artificial Intelligence in Health Sciences (DAIHS).

== Campus ==
The Humanitas University campus is situated in the southern precinct of Milan, adjacent to the Humanitas Research Hospital. The campus encompasses a total area of approximately 42,000 square meters (450,000 sq ft), distributed among six distinct buildings.

The comprehensive campus layout includes two dedicated teaching centers denoted as buildings A and F, a multifunctional hub in building B, a research center in building C, a university residence with 240 beds for student accommodation located in building D, and specialized research laboratories housed in building E.

The campus facilities feature a simulation center, multimedia classrooms and laboratories, designated study rooms and library, an auditorium, a conference center, a cafeteria, a café, a bistro, underground parking, bike station with charging for e-bikes, Enjoy car-sharing, Amazon lockers, as well as green spaces and sports areas.

== Organization and administration ==
The university is part of the Humanitas Group, a private academic medical center focused on integrated health care, education, and research. Humanitas employs 8,600 professionals and operates a network of 21 multi-specialist outpatient clinics and 11 distinct hospitals in Italy.

=== Governance and structure ===
The core governance of the University comprises the Board of Directors, responsible for overseeing economic and financial management, with the President serving as its legal representative. The managing director, guided by the Board, handles offices organization and delegated functions. The executive committee carries out tasks assigned by the Board.

The scientific and educational governance of the University is overseen by the Rector, who, in conjunction with the Academic Senate, shapes policies, guides teaching and research, and defines plans and resources allocation.

The General Manager oversees administrative activities and facilitates the flow of information for decision-making.

== Academics ==
The University education and training are fully integrated with Humanitas Hospital and the Humanitas Research Center, contributing to a model that merges academics, research, and clinical practice.

Humanitas University has gained international recognition for its research excellence and educational innovation. In the Times Higher Education World University Rankings 2025, it was placed in the 151–175 band for clinical and health sciences, and among the top 250 universities worldwide overall. As reported in the THE Student 2025 overview of the best universities in Italy, Humanitas ranked eighth nationwide when considering all institutions across all academic disciplines.

The university also offers the MEDTEC School, a pioneering joint program with the Polytechnic University of Milan that combines medicine and biomedical engineering—considered the first of its kind in Europe. Its Simulation Center is one of the largest and most advanced in Europe, spanning over 3,000 m^{2} (3,600 sq yd) and providing early practical training to medical students.

=== Degree Courses ===
The University provides a six-year course in Medicine and Surgery (MD), as well as a six-year degree program in Medicine and Biomedical Engineering (MEDTEC School), both taught entirely in English. They also offer bachelor's degree courses in Nursing, Physiotherapy, Biomedical Laboratory Techniques, as well as Imaging and Radiotherapy Techniques, all taught in Italian.

=== Post-Graduate Courses ===
As post-graduate training, the University offers residency in 30 different Medical Specialty Schools, as well as 10 different post-graduate master's degrees and 3 PhD programs.

=== Student Placement ===
For student placements, Hunimed implements a collaboration with the US National Board of Medical Examiners (NBME) with the following aims:

- Reviewing the educational program – curriculum and student assessments – to meet U.S. standards;

Providing Advice on:

- The usage of the most appropriate assessment instruments applied in North America and International medical schools.
- How best to prepare students for these assessments.

== Research ==
The Humanitas Research Center is a not-for-profit, academic, and independent institution applying a translational research approach in conjunction with Humanitas University and Hospital.

The center hosts 450 international researchers under the leadership of the Scientific Director, Alberto Mantovani. The Research Center features 10,000 square meters (110,000 sq ft) of high-tech laboratories, along with the expansive facilities of the Humanitas University campus.

=== AI Center ===
The research center on artificial intelligence was established in 2018, marking the first of its kind in Italy to be integrated with a hospital. The center brings together a diverse and multidisciplinary team, including doctors, managers, researchers, engineers, and data scientists.

== Rectors ==
- Marco Montorsi (2014–2023)
- Luigi Maria Terracciano (since 2023)

== Presidents ==
- Gianfelice Rocca (since 2014)

== See also ==
- Alberto Mantovani
- Guido Torzilli
- Gianfelice Rocca
