= Pavia railway station =

Railway station in Pavia, Italy

Pavia
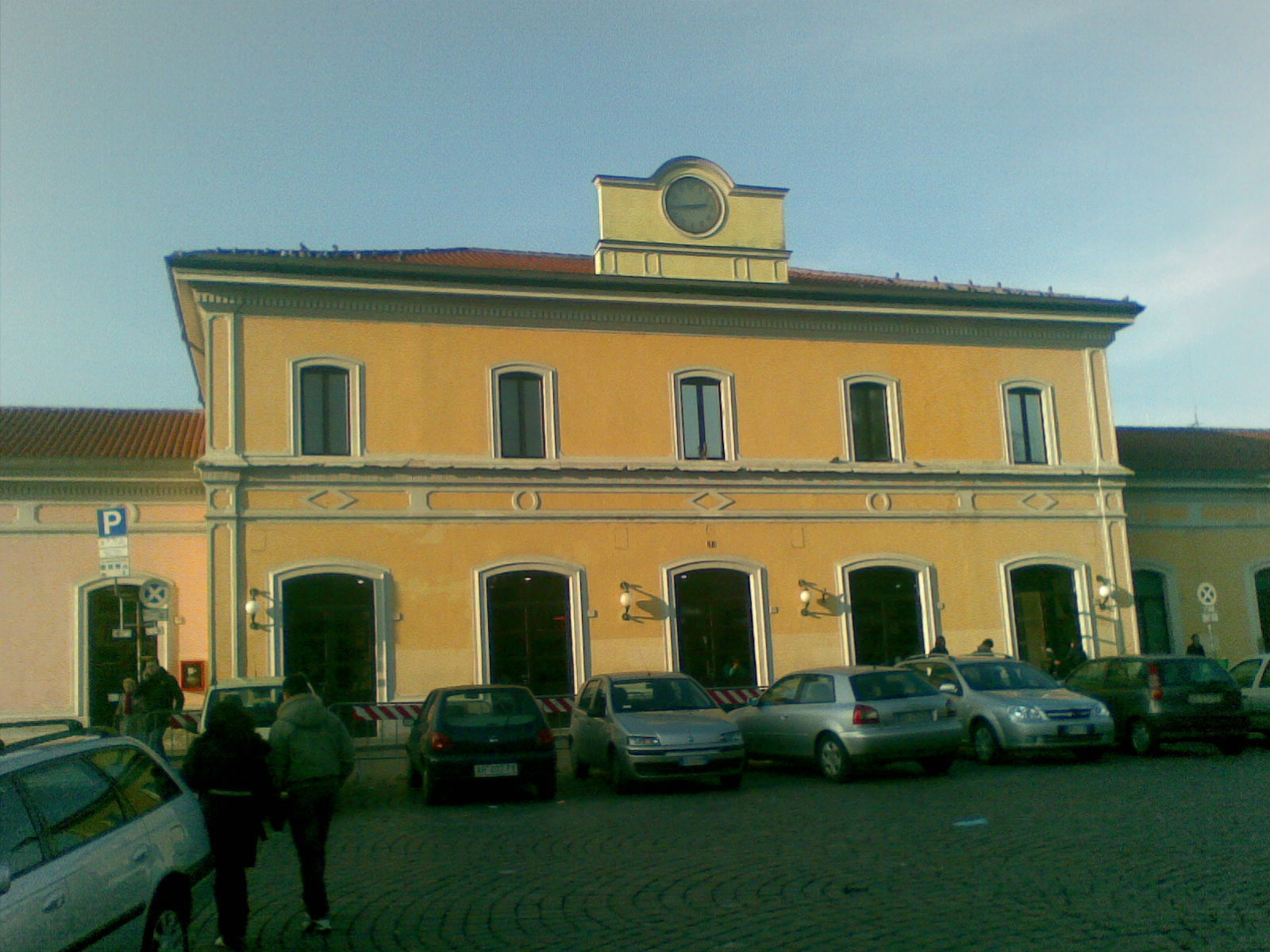
- The passenger building

General information
- Location: Piazzale della Stazione; 27100 Pavia; Pavia, Pavia, Lombardy; Italy
- Coordinates: 45°11′20″N 09°08′42″E
- Operator: Rete Ferroviaria Italiana; Centostazioni
- Lines: Genoa–Milan; Vercelli–Pavia; Pavia–Alessandria; Pavia–Mantua; Pavia–Stradella
- Distance: 28.603 km (17.773 mi) from Milano Rogoredo
- Train operators: Trenitalia, Trenord
- Connections: Urban and suburban buses

Other information
- Classification: Gold

History
- Opened: 1 May 1862; 164 years ago

Services
Preceding station	Trenord	Following station
Certosa di Pavia towards Milano Bovisa	Line S13 (Milan suburban railway service)	Terminus
Location
- Location within Lombardy Location within Northern Italy Location within Italy

Pavia railway station (Italian: Stazione di Pavia) serves the city and comune of Pavia, in the region of Lombardy, northern Italy. Opened in 1862, it forms part of the Genoa–Milan railway, and is also a terminus of four secondary railways, linking Pavia with Alessandria, Mantua, Vercelli and Stradella.

The station is currently managed by Rete Ferroviaria Italiana (RFI). However, the commercial area of the passenger building is managed by Centostazioni. Train services are operated by Trenitalia. Each of these companies is a subsidiary of Ferrovie dello Stato (FS), Italy's state-owned rail company.

== Location ==
Pavia railway station is situated at Piazzale della Stazione, a short distance to the west of the city centre.

== History ==
The station was opened on 10 May 1862, upon the simultaneous completion of two sections of railway line. They were the Milan–Pavia section of what was to become the Treviglio–Pavia–Voghera railway, and the final section of the Pavia–Alessandria railway. The opening of these two sections of line made it possible for the first time to travel by train between Milan and Genoa.

Recent renovation work at the station was performed mainly on the passenger building. The lobby was made more spacious and comfortable by the removal of the walls separating the waiting room and the lobby. That space is now equipped with seats, local trades and other services. The lighting was also replaced, and appropriate technical alterations were made to comply with legal requirements. Architectural barriers were removed, the public conveniences were restructured, and new elevators were installed at the underpass and on the platforms. Routine maintenance was also carried out on the plastering, and windows and canopies were restored.

== Features ==
The passenger building consists of three parts: the central one is on two levels, and is home to the majority of services for passengers. At ground level, it has five arches that provide access to the building, and on top of its facade at first floor level is an analogue station clock. The other two parts of the building have a structure very similar to one another. They extend symmetrically from the central body and have six arches. These two parts house the local technical and commercial spaces.

The station once had a goods yard with an adjoining goods shed, but the former has been dismantled and the latter converted for use as a storage facility. The architecture of that facility is very similar to that of other Italian railway stations.

The station yard has five tracks, all equipped with a platform sheltered by a canopy and connected with the other platforms by an underpass. In detail:

- Bay platform: used by trains to and from Codogno
- Track 1: deviates from the main rail path through the station, and is used for the overtaking of trains with odd numbers or for trains terminating in Pavia.
- Track 2: one of the two main paths through the station, and is used by trains with odd numbers.
- Track 3: the other main path, is for stops by trains with even numbers.
- Track 4: another deviating path, is used for overtaking of trains with even numbers or trains that have Pavia as the terminus station.
- Track 5: this track is also on a deviating path, and is used sporadically.

There are two other tracks, not served by platforms, which are used for goods trains, or for short-term storage of machinery involved in line maintenance.

== Train services ==
The station has about 8.7 million passenger movements each year.

Passenger services are operated exclusively by Trenitalia on behalf of the region of Lombardy.

The trains are regional services, Eurostar City and InterCity trains. Their main destinations are Milano Centrale, Codogno and Alessandria.

The station is served by the following service(s):

- EuroCity services (Thello) Marseille - Cannes - Nice - Monaco - Ventimiglia - Genoa - Milan

== See also ==
- History of rail transport in Italy
- List of railway stations in Lombardy
- Rail transport in Italy
- Railway stations in Italy
