= Milan–Genoa railway =

Railway line in Italy

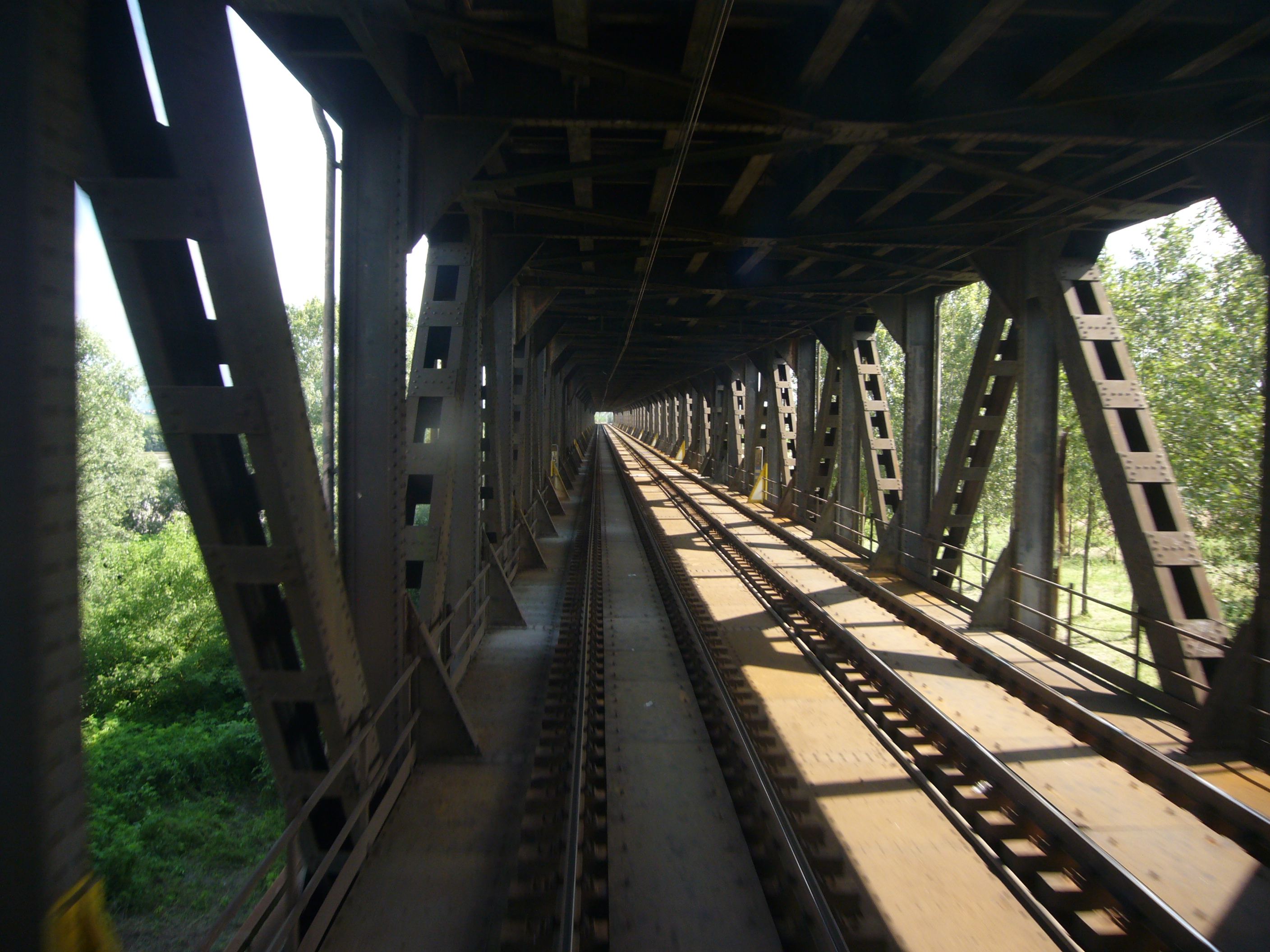
- The bridge over the Po river at Bressana Bottarone

Overview
- Status: in use
- Owner: RFI
- Line number: 32, 72, 73
- Locale: Italy
- Termini: Milano Centrale; Genova Piazza Principe

Service
- Type: Heavy rail
- Operator(s): Trenitalia

History
- Opened: 1862; 164 years ago

Technical
- Number of tracks: 2
- Track gauge: 1,435 mm (4 ft 8 1/2 in) standard gauge
- Electrification: 3 kV DC

The Genoa–Milan railway is a major Italian rail line, connecting the cities of Genoa and Milan. It is 157 km (98 mi) long and fully electrified at 3,000 V DC. Passenger traffic is managed by Trenitalia.

== History ==
Unlike the Turin-Genoa line, the Milan-Genoa line was not built as a single project. Instead it developed from the joining of different lines by a shortcut. The first part of the line from Milan to Genoa is the section from Milano Rogoredo to Pavia, which was opened on 10 May 1862 as a branch off the line from Milano Centrale to Piacenza, opened on 14 November 1861. Earlier, on 25 January 1858, the Alessandria-Tortona-Voghera-Casteggio line opened to the public along with the connection between Tortona and Novi Ligure, providing good connections to the by now completed Turin-Genoa line. On 14 November 1867 the opening to traffic of the rail link from Pavia to Voghera completed the link between Milan and Genoa.

The section between Genoa and Novi Ligure over the Giovi Pass used by both the Turin-Genoa and the Milan-Genoa lines, however, was extremely difficult and therefore a new link between Arquata Scrivia and Tortona was built which was opened on 1 October 1916, completing the current form of the line, except for improvements made in Genoa and the deviation opened in 2007 between Milan Rogoredo and Locate Triulzi replacing the 1862 route.

Track	Opened	Note
Arquata Scrivia-Busalla	10 February 1853	Part of the Turin–Genoa line
Busalla–Genoa	18 December 1853	Part of the Turin–Genoa line
Voghera-Tortona	25 January 1858	Part of the Alessandria–Piacenza
Milan–Pavia	10 May 1862	
Pavia–Voghera	15 November 1867	Part of the Voghera–Pavia–Cremona–Brescia line
Tortona–Arquata Scrivia	1 October 1916	Replacing the original line via Novi

== High speed line ==
The Tortona–Genoa high-speed railway (also known as the "third Giovi pass") project has been under development to bypass the mountainous and more congested southern section of the line since 1991. As of August 2023, this line is forecast to open in 2026.

== See also ==
- List of railway lines in Italy
