= Cambridge University Press and Assessment =

Non-teaching department of the University of Cambridge

- Status: Non-school institution of the University of Cambridge
- Founded: 1 August 2021; 5 years ago
- Headquarters location: Cambridge, England
- Key people: Deborah Prentice (vice chancellor); Peter Phillips (CEO)
- Revenue: ▲£1.025 billion (2024)
- No. of employees: 6,839 (2024)
- Official website: cambridge.org

Cambridge University Press and Assessment is a non-school institution of the University of Cambridge. It was formed under Queen Elizabeth II's approval in August 2021 by the merge between Cambridge University Press and Cambridge Assessment. The institution is headquartered in Cambridge, England, with 50 overseas office locations.

The institution's products include the Cambridge Dictionary, Cambridge Core, IGCSEs, Cambridge Technicals, Linguaskill and hundreds of academic journals and books.

Following the merger, the combined group calculated that it reaches 100 million learners worldwide, with 85% of its revenues coming from outside the United Kingdom. It reported revenue in excess of £1 billion and operating profit above £200 million in 2024.

Cambridge University Press & Assessment is reported as delivering:

- The Cambridge Dictionary, the number one dictionary website in the world
- 125 million downloads of scholarly research, including book chapters and research papers took place in 2023-24
- 63 percent of new research journal articles are now published as open access
- Books and journal articles from almost 200 Nobel Laureates (Cambridge also published seven of the 2024 Nobel laureates)
- 11 million grades issued by its exam boards in 2023–24, including Cambridge OCR and Cambridge International Education

Cambridge University Press & Assessment has advocated for "Effective climate education [to] become available to students at every age and stage".

As part of the University of Cambridge, Cambridge University Press and Assessment is a non-profit organization. It is led by Peter Phillips, its chief executive officer, who reports to the Vice-Chancellor of the university.

== History ==
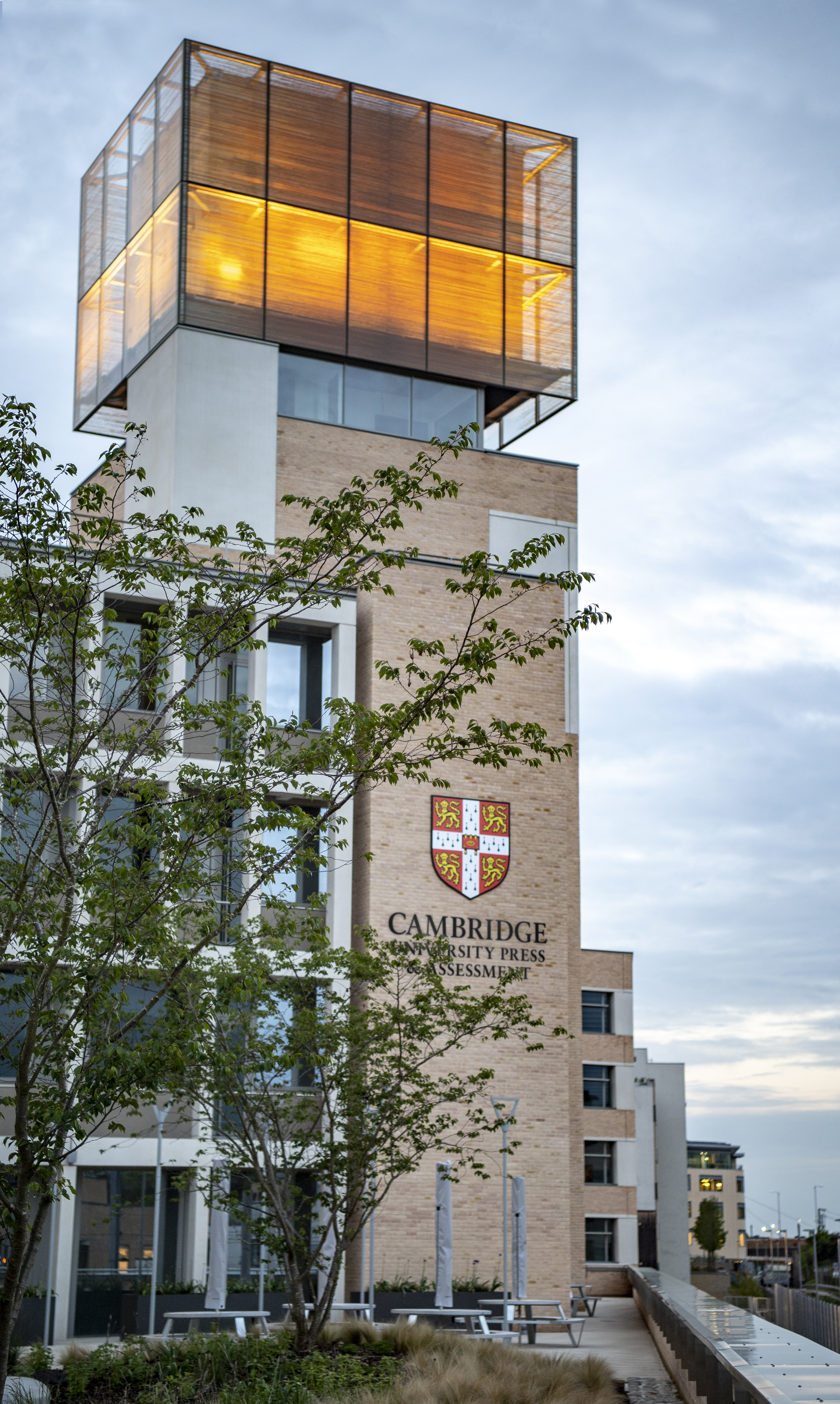
The Tower at the Triangle Building, part of the main headquarters of Cambridge University Press and Assessment

Cambridge University Press and Assessment was legally formed on 1 August 2021. Her Majesty Queen Elizabeth II approved amendments to University of Cambridge Statutes, which formally recognised the operational merger of Cambridge Assessment and Cambridge University Press, presented at a Privy Council meeting on 15 December 2021. The main changes to Statute J were to replace references to the University Press with references to the merged entity under the title of the Press and Assessment Department, and to update the name of the Press Syndicate to the Press and Assessment Syndicate. The two founding organisations have an entwined history, since December 1858 when Cambridge University Press first printed exam papers for Cambridge Assessment.

At the 2022 Education World Forum, Cambridge University Press and Assessment Chief Executive Peter Phillips warned of the impact of the COVID-19 pandemic on students' mental health, urging the gathering of education ministers and leaders to "put wellbeing at the heart of everything we do."

== Governance ==
The organisation is governed by a 'Syndicate' (Press and Assessment Syndicate) of 18 senior members of the University of Cambridge. The Press and Assessment Syndicate governs the group's activity and exercises oversight through the Press and Assessment Board and its committees. Day-to-day management of the business is delegated by the Syndicate to the Cambridge University Press and Assessment's Chief Executive Peter Phillips, working with its executive board. Updates from the syndicate are published by the official newspaper of the University of Cambridge, The Reporter.

In a 2021 discussion reported in the Cambridge University Reporter, D.D.K.Chow of Trinity College, expressed concerns about the lack of academic oversight of the newly merged institution.
