= Alma mater =

School or university that a person has attended or graduated from

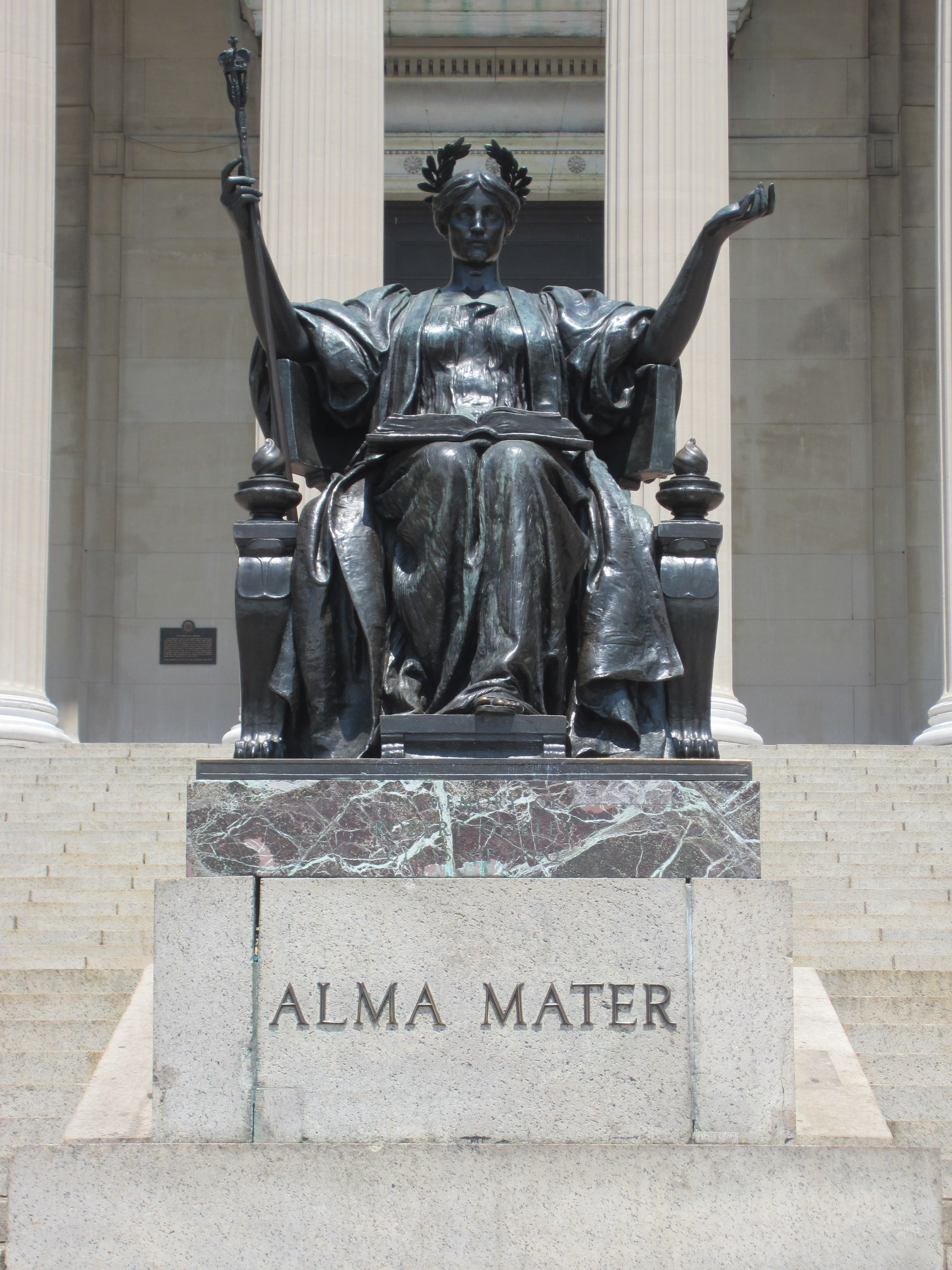
The Alma Mater statue at Columbia University in New York City, cast by Daniel Chester French in 1903

Alma mater (Latin: alma mater; pl.: almae matres) is an allegorical Latin phrase meaning 'nourishing mother'. It personifies a school that a person has attended or graduated from. The term is related to alumnus, meaning 'nursling', which describes a school graduate.

In its earliest usage, alma mater was an honorific title for various mother goddesses, especially Ceres or Cybele. Later, in Catholicism, it became a title for Mary, mother of Jesus. By the early 17th century, the nursing mother became an allegory for universities. Used by many schools in Europe and the United States, it has special association with the University of Bologna, whose motto Alma Mater Studiorum ("nurturing mother of studies") emphasizes its role in originating the modern university.

Several university campuses in the United States display artistic representations of Alma Mater, depicted as a robed woman wearing a laurel wreath crown. The earliest of these is the bronze Alma Mater statue at Columbia University, designed in 1901 by Daniel Chester French and installed in 1903.

In the US the term alma mater is often used to describe a school song.

== Etymology ==
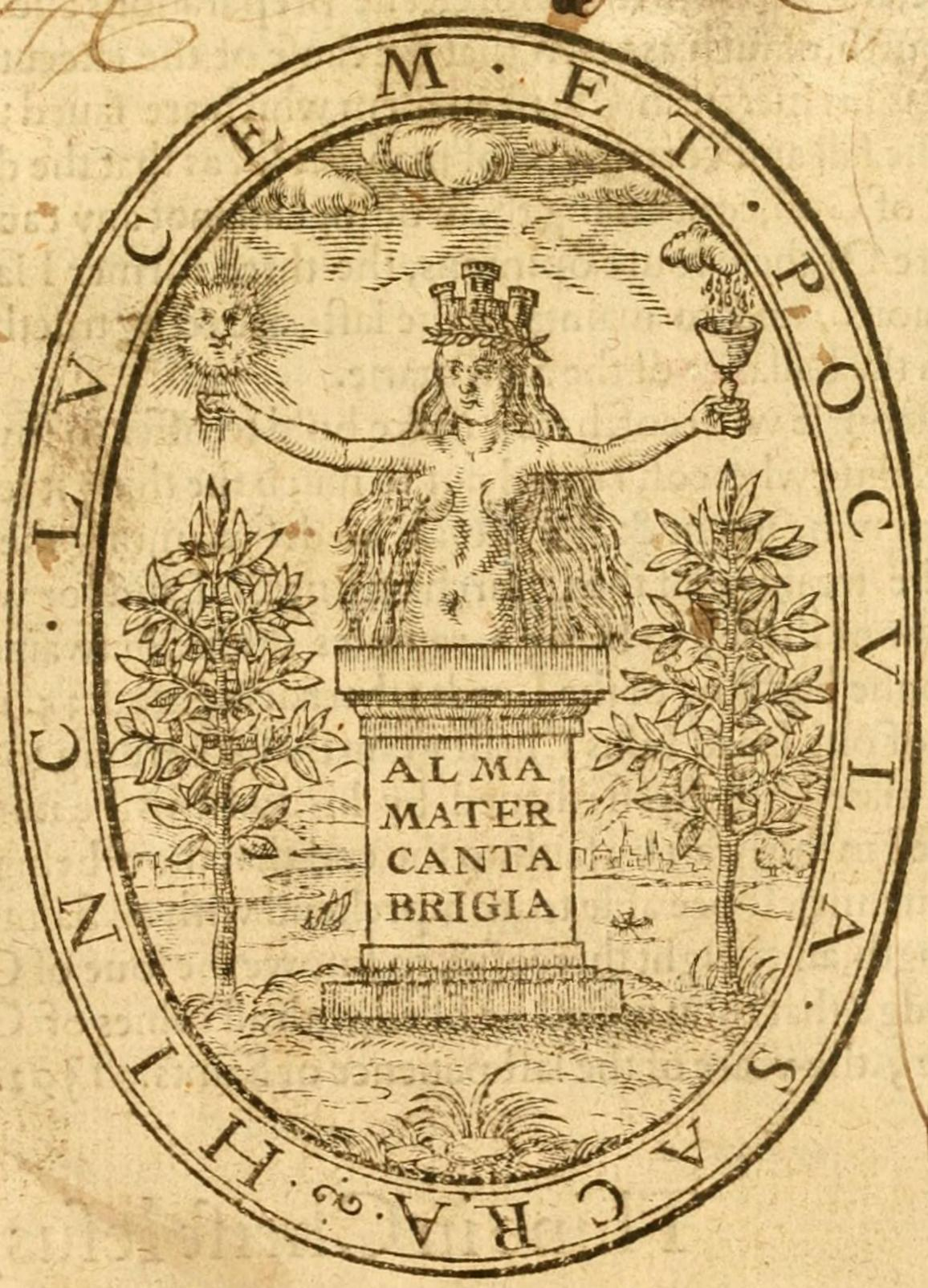
John Legate's Alma Mater for the University of Cambridge, written in 1600, the first known use of the term

Although alma (nourishing) was a common epithet for Ceres, Cybele, Venus, and other mother goddesses, it was not frequently used in conjunction with mater in classical Latin. In the Oxford Latin Dictionary, the full phrase's origin is attributed to De rerum natura, in which Lucretius uses the term as an epithet for an unnamed earth goddess:

Denique caelesti sumus omnes semine oriundi
omnibus ille idem pater est, unde alma liquentis
umoris guttas mater cum terra recepit (2.991–993)

We are all sprung from that celestial seed,
all of us have same father, from whom earth,
the nourishing mother, receives drops of liquid moisture

After the fall of Rome, the term was used in Christian liturgy to describe Jesus' mother, Mary. "Alma Redemptoris Mater" is a well-known eleventh century antiphon devoted to Mary.

The earliest documented use of the term to refer to a university is in 1600, when the University of Cambridge printer, John Legate, began using an emblem for the university press. The first-known appearance of the device is in William Perkins', A Golden Chain, a book first printed by Legate in 1600. On the title-page, the Latin phrase Alma Mater Cantabrigia ("nourishing mother Cambridge") is inscribed on a pedestal bearing a lactating woman wearing a mural crown.

In reference works of English etymology, often the first university-related usage is cited as 1710, when an academic mother figure is mentioned in a remembrance of Henry More by Richard Ward.

== Notable use ==
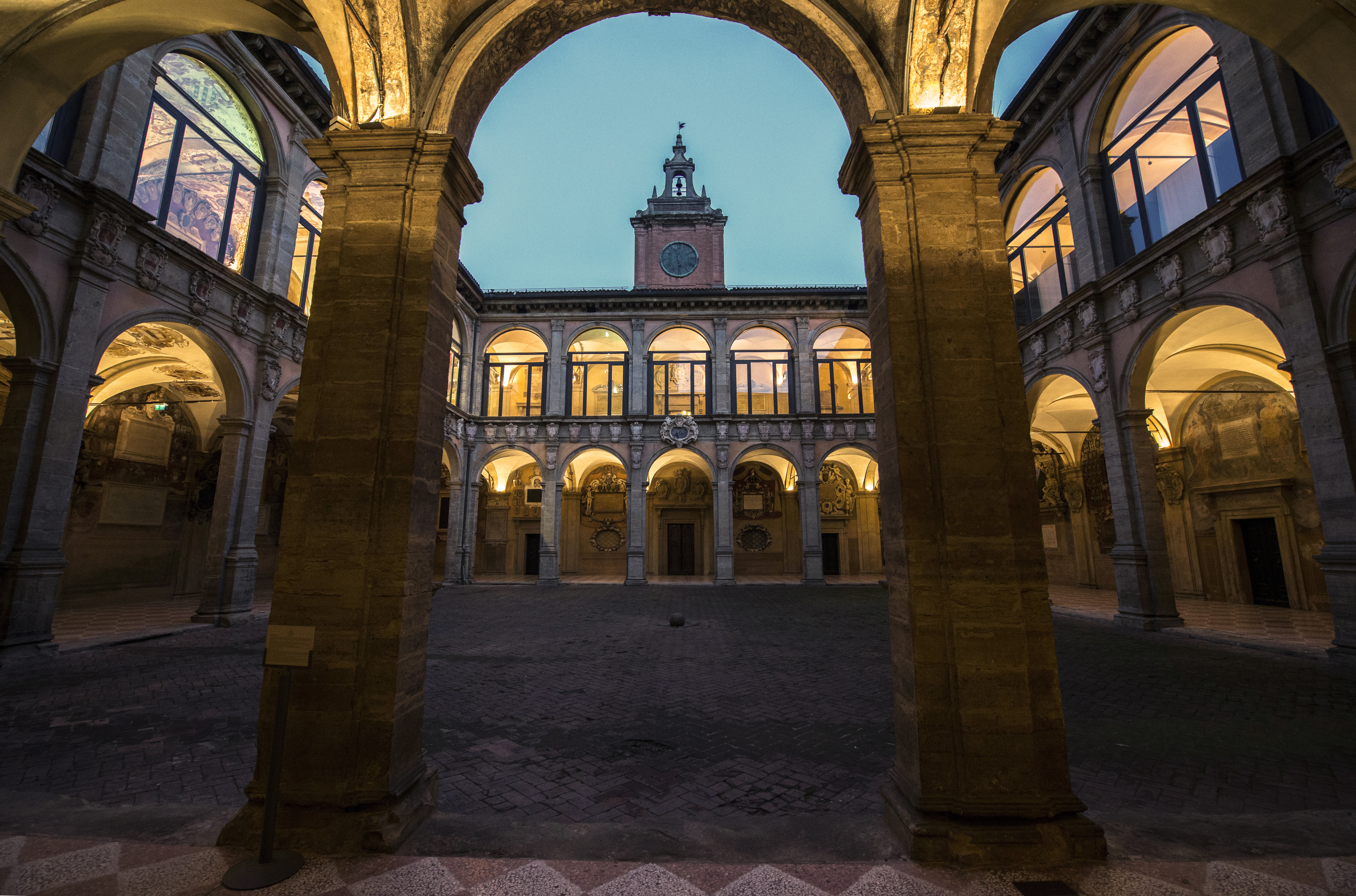
The University of Bologna, the world's oldest university in continuous operation, known in Latin as Alma Mater Studiorum (nourishing mother of studies)

Many historic European universities have adopted Alma Mater as part of the Latin translation of their official name. The Latin name of the University of Bologna, Alma Mater Studiorum (nourishing mother of studies), refers to its status as the oldest continuously operating university in the world. At other European universities, such as the Alma Mater Lipsiensis in Leipzig, Germany, or Alma Mater Jagiellonica, Poland, the title emphasizes historic ties to a founding city or dynasty.

The Alma Mater Europaea in Salzburg, Austria, an international university founded by the European Academy of Sciences and Arts in 2010, uses the term as its official name.

In the United States, the College of William & Mary in Williamsburg, Virginia, has been called the "Alma Mater of the Nation" because of its ties to the founding of the country.

At Queen's University in Kingston, Ontario, and the University of British Columbia in Vancouver, British Columbia, the main student government is known as the Alma Mater Society.

== Monuments ==
Sculptures of Alma Mater are found on several American and Cuban university campuses. In 1901, to commemorate the opening of the Low Library, Columbia University commissioned Daniel Chester French to design a bronze statue for the library's steps. French chose the Alma Mater to allegorically embody the university without depicting its founder, King George II. A similar sculpture, cast in 1919 by Mario Korbel, sits on the main entrance steps at the University of Havana.

Other tributes to Alma Mater include Lorado Taft's 1929 sculpture at the University of Illinois Urbana-Champaign and Cyrus Dallin's 1925 sculpture at the Mary Institute in 1925, commissioned by Washington University supporters.

An altarpiece mural in Yale University's Sterling Memorial Library, painted in 1932 by Eugene Savage, depicts the Alma Mater as a bearer of light and truth, standing in the midst of figures representing the arts and sciences.

Depictions of Alma Mater
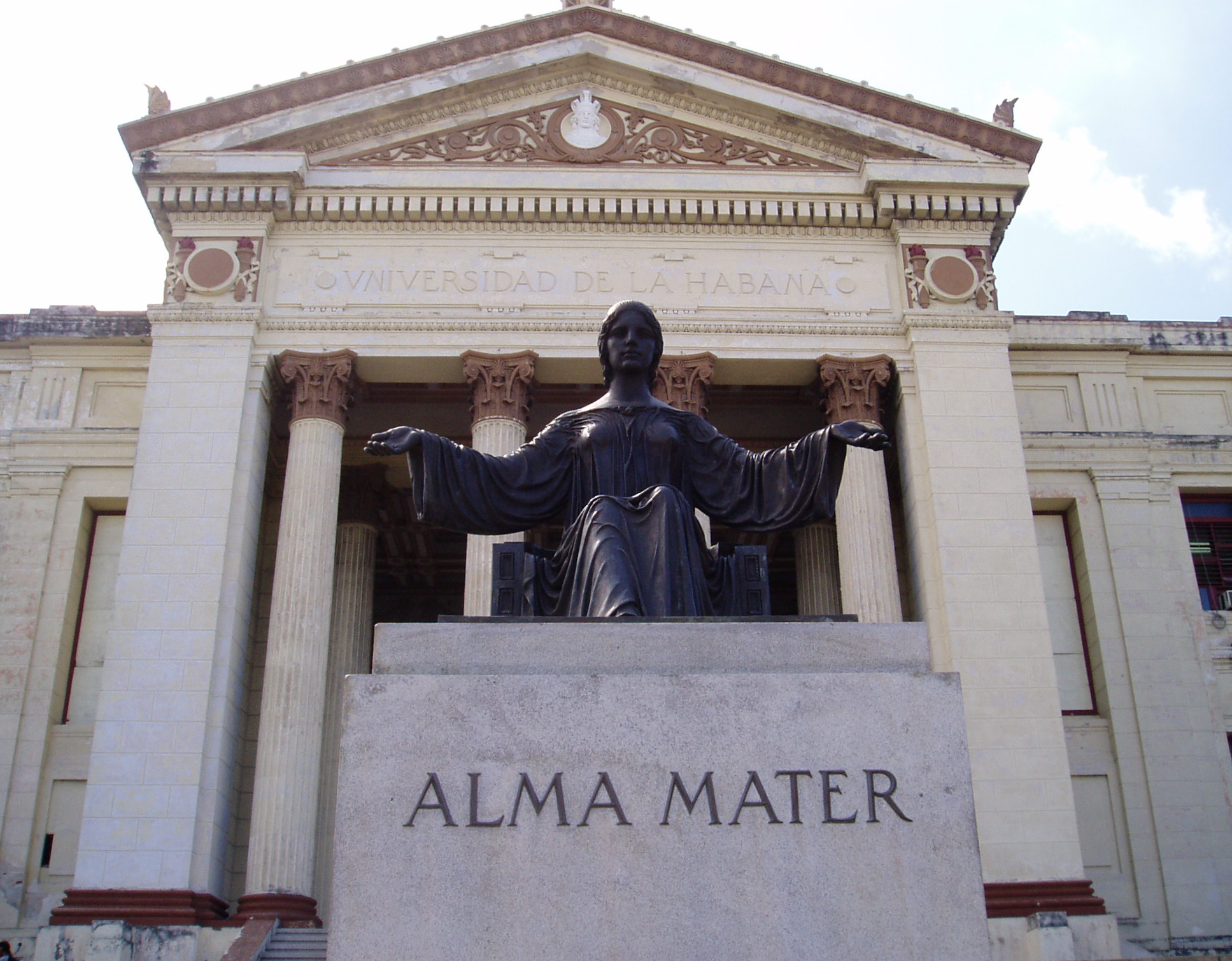
Alma Mater at the University of Havana

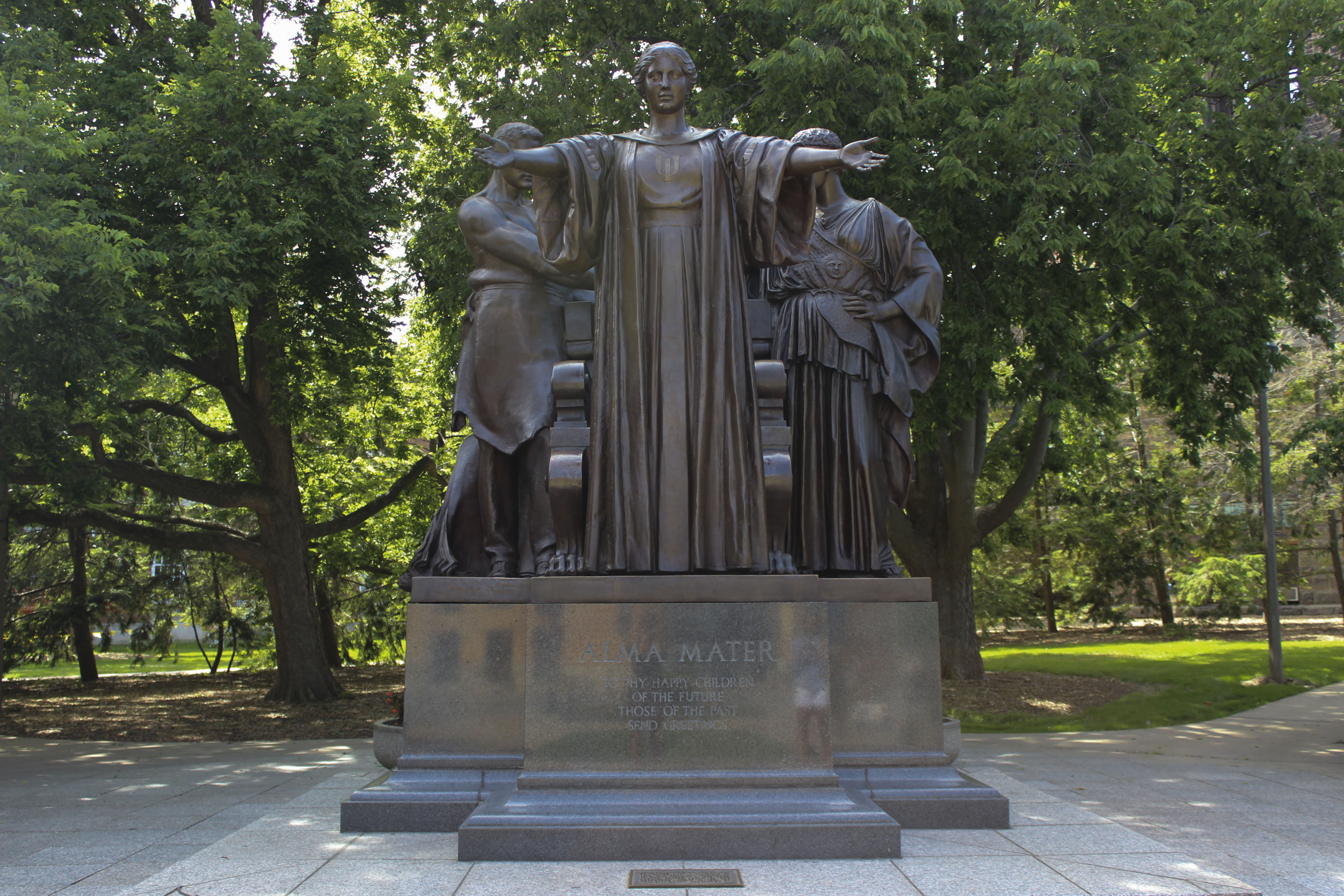
Alma Mater by Lorado Taft (1929) at the University of Illinois Urbana-Champaign

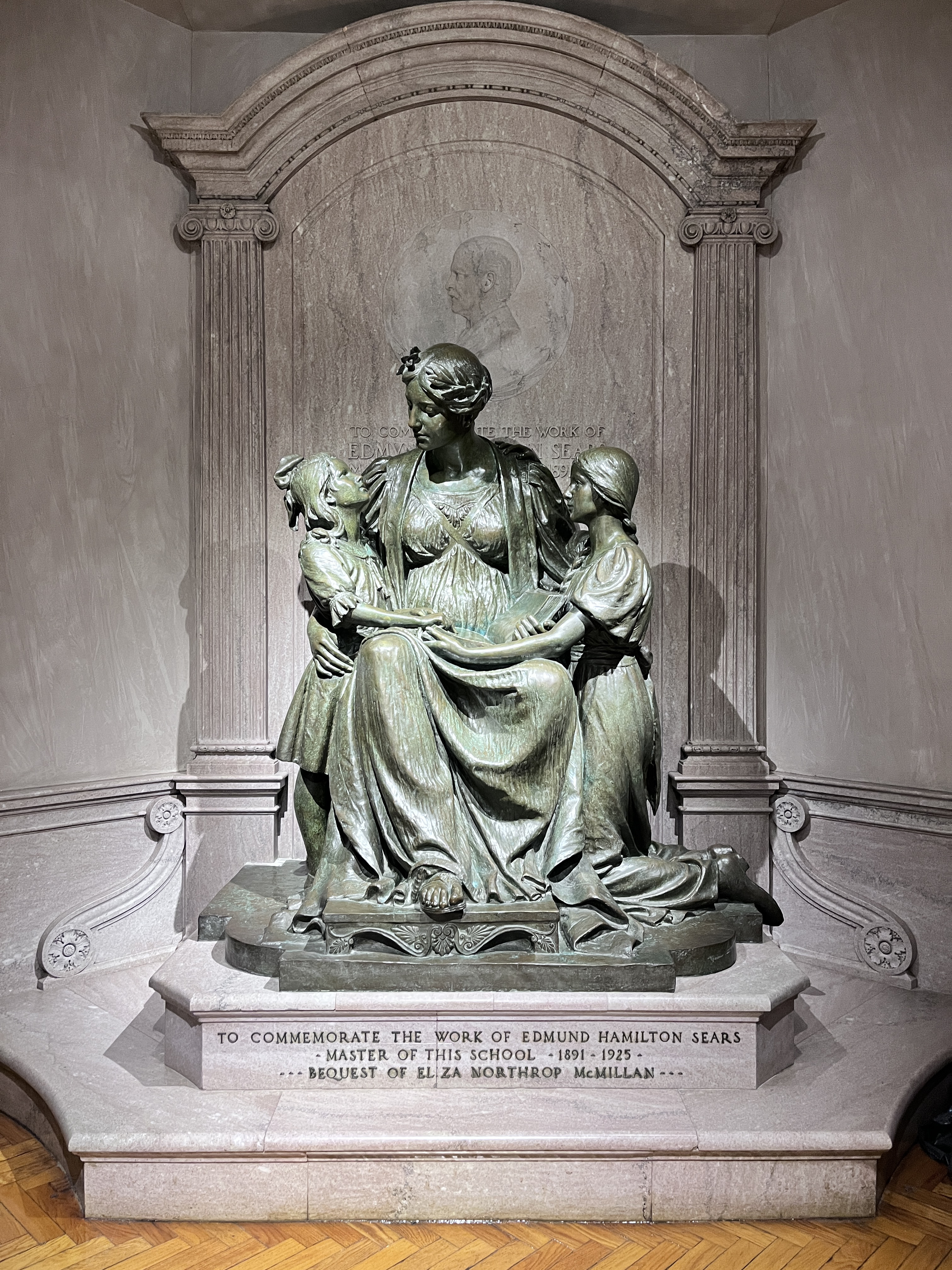
Alma Mater by Cyrus Dallin at Mary Institute and St. Louis Country Day School

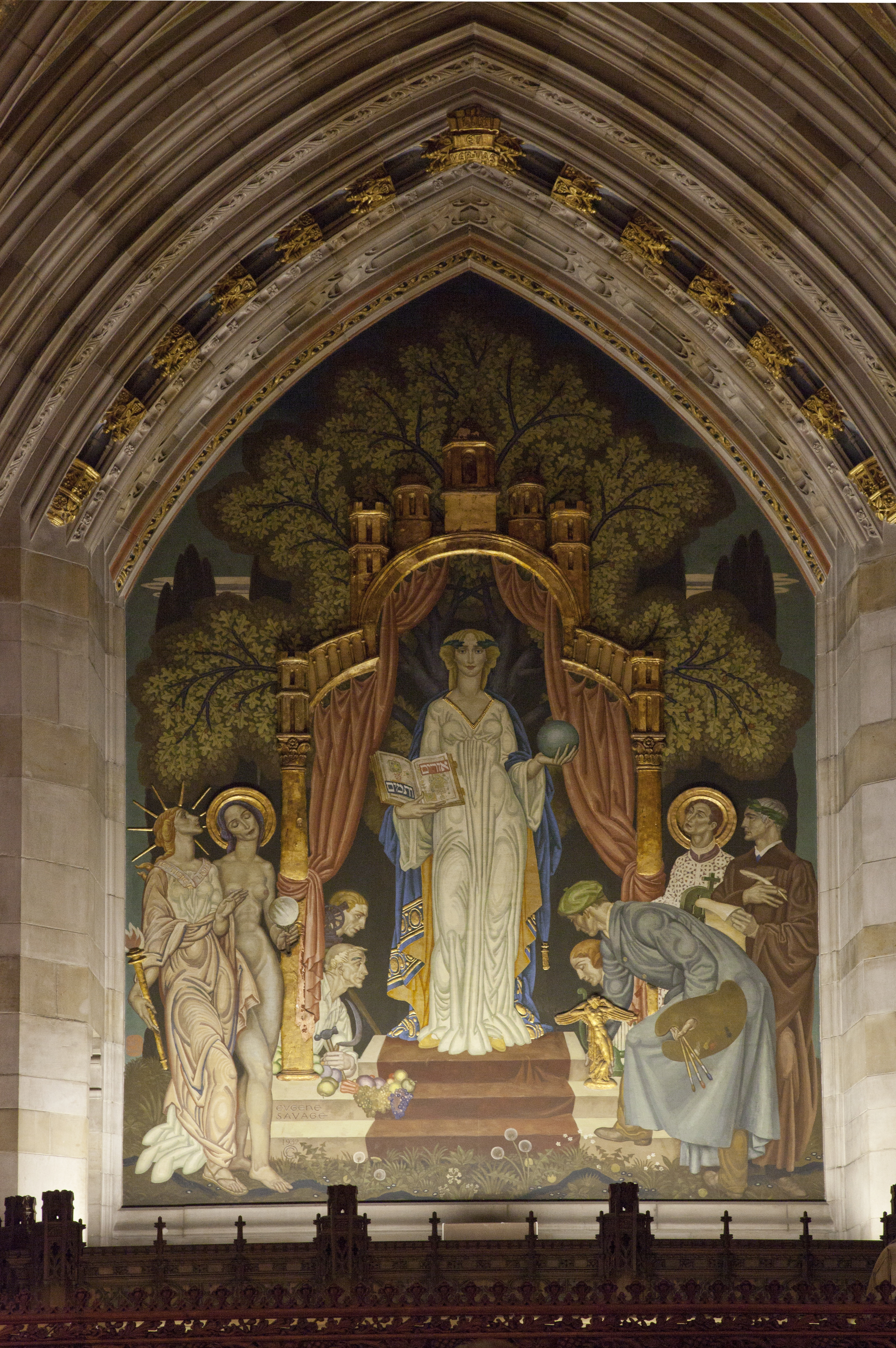
Alma Mater altarpiece mural by Eugene Savage at Yale University
