= Cambridge International Education =

International educational organisation

Coordinates: 52.1990°N 0.1282°E

- Abbreviation: CIE
- Formation: 1858; 168 years ago
- Legal status: Department of the University of Cambridge
- Parent organisation: Cambridge University Press & Assessment
- Website: cambridgeinternational.org
- Formerly called: (University of) Cambridge International Examinations

Cambridge International Education (abbreviated CIE, informally known as Cambridge International or simply Cambridge and formerly known as CAIE, Cambridge Assessment International Education and CIE, Cambridge International Examinations) is a provider of international qualifications, offering examinations and qualifications to 10,000 schools in more than 160 countries. It is part of Cambridge University Press & Assessment, a non-profit and non-teaching department of the University of Cambridge.

== History ==
Cambridge University Press & Assessment is part of the University of Cambridge. Its assessment organisation was founded in 1858 as the University of Cambridge Local Examinations Syndicate. It would later on become known as (University of) Cambridge International Examinations, or simply CIE. As part of a restructuring process of the University of Cambridge, Cambridge Assessment and Cambridge University Press were merged to form Cambridge University Press & Assessment and CIE eventually became CAIE: Cambridge Assessment International Education. Thereafter, CAIE was renamed Cambridge International Education and adopted again the abbreviation CIE.

== Qualifications ==
Cambridge International Education offers 5 educational programmes: the Early Years Programme for children aged 3-5, the Primary Programme for children aged 5-11, the Lower Secondary Programme for pre-teens aged 11-14, the Upper Secondary Programme for teens aged 14-16 where pupils take the Cambridge IGCSE and O-Levels and the Advanced Programme for teens aged 16-19 where pupils take the Cambridge AS and A-Levels. In addition, Cambridge International Education provides Key Stage examinations for primary and secondary schools internationally.

== Recognition ==
Former logo of CIE

Cambridge qualifications are recognized for admission by all UK universities as well as universities in the United States (Stanford and all Ivy League universities), Canada, the European Union, the Middle East, West Asia, New Zealand, Pakistan, Bangladesh, Sri Lanka, Nepal, Kazakhstan as well as in other countries.

== Partnerships ==
Cambridge International Education is engaged in partnerships with governments of 25 countries on integrated curriculum and assessment design and professional development for teachers.

== Philanthropy ==
As part of its corporate social responsibility initiatives, Cambridge International Education provides charitable support for children from troubled backgrounds.

== Criticism ==
The predecessor organisation of Cambridge International Education was criticized in 2019 for what some claimed were "colonial educational practices" in its literature curricula. A 2019 study said that Cambridge Assessment had privileged European male authors and under-represented female authors from developing countries.

== See also ==
- International Baccalaureate
- European Baccalaureate
- Cambridge University Press and Assessment
- Cambridge Assessment English
- University of Cambridge
