= BiblioTech =

BiblioTech may refer to libraries in countries or municipalities with Latin or Spanish-speaking populations:

== Brazil ==
- National Library of Brazil

== Chile ==
- Biblioteca Nacional de Chile, Santiago

== France ==
- Bibliothèque de la Sorbonne

== Italy ==
- Biblioteca Ambrosiana, Milan
- Biblioteca Estense, library of the dukes of Este in Modena
- Biblioteca Laurentiana, Florence
- Biblioteca Marciana, Venice
- Biblioteca Nazionale Centrale di Roma, Rome
- Biblioteca Nazionale Vittorio Emanuele III, Naples
- Vatican Library in Italy

== Mexico ==
- Biblioteca Palafoxiana, Puebla
- National Library of Mexico, Mexico City

== Portugal ==
- Biblioteca Nacional de Portugal, Lisbon

== Spain ==
- Biblioteca Nacional de España, Madrid
- Biblioteca Virtual Miguel de Cervantes, University of Alicante, a digital library

== United States ==
- BiblioTech (San Antonio), Bexar County, Texas, a digital library
- Bibliotech (textbooks)
- BiblioTech. Why Libraries Matter More Than Ever in the Age of Google (2015), a book by John Palfrey
- BiblioTech Program at Stanford University, Silicon Valley, California, an educational resource
