= Peter Phillips (businessman) =

British business leader

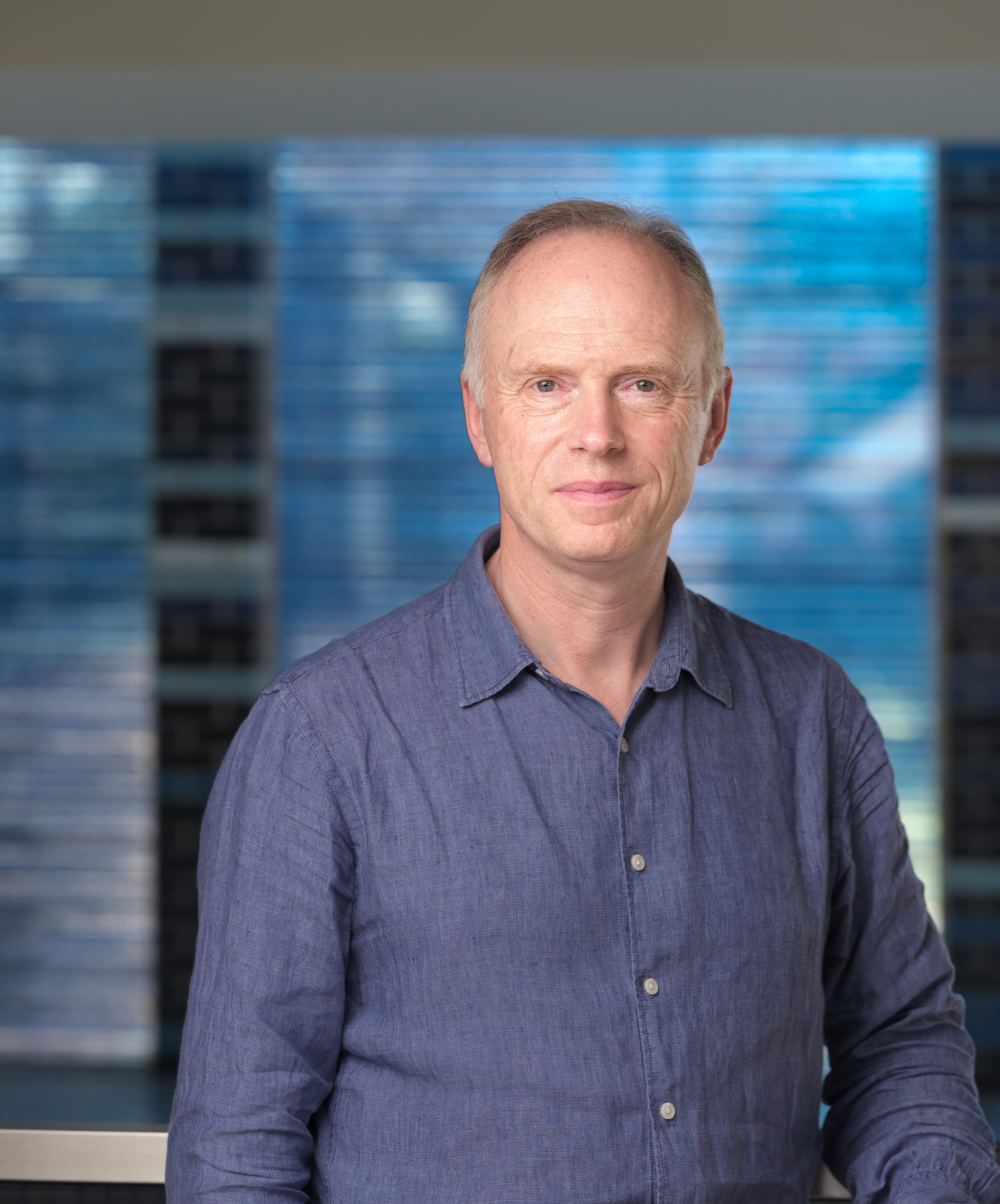
- Phillips in 2021
- Born: Peter Andrew Jestyn Phillips; 1 May 1962 (age 64)
- Education: Merton College, Oxford (BA); Harvard University; University of Cambridge (MA)
- Occupations: Business leader, strategist
- Spouse: Clare Higgins
- Children: 3

Peter Andrew Jestyn Phillips (born 1 May 1962) is the Chief Executive of Cambridge University Press & Assessment, a non-teaching department of the University of Cambridge, when it was formed on 1 August 2021.

He is also a Fellow of Wolfson College, Cambridge, a former Trustee of the Cambridge Commonwealth Trust and a former President of The Publishers Association.

He was previously a trustee of the Nuffield Trust, the Crafts Council, Article 19 and the John Schofield Trust, an adviser to the Royal College of Physicians, Chairman of the Sabre Trust and a director of Parliamentary Broadcasting Limited.

The Bookseller described Phillips as one of the "most influential people in UK publishing”.

== Education ==
Phillips studied Mathematics at Merton College, Oxford, graduating with first class honours. He also holds a Masters degree from the University of Cambridge and graduated from Harvard Business School’s Advanced Management Program in 2002.

== Career ==
After graduating from the University of Oxford, Phillips joined the strategy consulting firm Bain & Company, where he spent seven years, before moving on to corporate finance at investment bank SG Warburg.

In 1993, he joined the British Broadcasting Corporation (BBC) as Head of Corporate Planning and became Finance Director of BBC News in 1997, before being appointed as BBC News’ Chief Operating Officer in 2001. In 2005, he became the BBC’s Director of Business Development, and was responsible for the sale of BBC Broadcast to Australian investment bank, Macquarie Bank, for £166m. The business was subsequently renamed Red Bee Media.

In 2006, Phillips moved to Ofcom, the UK's media and communications regulator, where he was a member of the Board. As Partner, Strategy & Market Developments, he was responsible for its approach to reshaping regulation in the light of digital developments, and led its work on the future of public service broadcasting, high-speed broadband, and illegal internet file sharing. Early in his tenure, he presented Ofcom's findings into the changing use of electronic devices in the UK which questioned the future of commercial advertising, and was a member of the Steering Board that informed the UK government's 2009 strategic report into a Digital Britain that was sponsored by the Department for Culture, Media and Sport and Department for Business, Innovation and Skills. In 2007, he led the organisation's call for a national debate on the future of children's television in Britain, given concerns about cultural differences present in imported shows. Giving evidence to the House of Lords Communications Committee in 2010, Phillips acknowledged concerns about children's programming in the UK, but stated the output of domestic broadcasters had been driven by parliamentary decisions. In 2008, he presented the findings of the organisation's second consultation into the future of Public Service Broadcasting, which concluded that £145-235 million of replacement public funding would needed by 2012 to keep public service programmes in the UK in addition to the BBC. Phillips and other Board members turned down bonuses in 2009 after the organisation froze the pay of all Ofcom staff during the Great Recession. In 2010, he presented the conclusions of the organisation's 18-month review of early termination charges on landline telephone contracts in the UK. Telephone operators BT, TalkTalk and Virgin Media all reduced their exit charges following the regulator's determination of apparent inconsistencies with the Unfair Terms in Consumer Contracts Regulations 1999.

In 2010, Phillips moved to Cambridge University Press, the world's oldest media organisation, as Chief Operating Officer. He was appointed as the Press's Chief Executive in 2012. In 2018, Phillips, along with other representatives of the Publishers Association called on the UK government to make sure the country retained its place as ‘the world’s publisher’ during the UK government's Brexit negotiations with the European Union.

In 2021, he became the inaugural Chief Executive of Cambridge University Press & Assessment, formed when the University of Cambridge merged Cambridge University Press with its worldwide assessment arm University of Cambridge Local Examinations Syndicate (UCLES, also known as Cambridge Assessment).

At the 2022 Education World Forum, Peter Phillips warned of the impact of the Covid-19 pandemic on students' mental health, urging the gathering of education ministers and leaders to "put wellbeing at the heart of everything we do."

In 2024, Phillips argued for “more attention and investment in Africa’s education systems”, in an article for the World Economic Forum. That year he wrote in the Financial Times that "Global economic advancement hinges on educational success in low-income countries."
