= Packt =

Publishing company

Packt Publishing Ltd
- Founded: 2004
- Founder: David Maclean, Rachel Maclean
- Country of origin: United Kingdom
- Headquarters location: Birmingham
- Publication types: Books
- Nonfiction topics: Technology
- Revenue: £18.4m (2018)
- Official website: www.packtpub.com

Packt is a publishing company founded in 2004 and headquartered in Birmingham, UK, with offices in Mumbai, India.

Packt primarily publishes print and electronic books and videos relating to information technology, including programming, web design, data analysis, and hardware.

== History ==
Founded in 2003 by David and Rachel Maclean, Packt Publishing provides books, eBooks, video tutorials, and articles for software engineers, web developers, system administrators, and users. The company states that it supports and publishes books on smaller projects and subjects that standard publishing companies cannot make profitable. The company's business model, which involves print-on-demand publishing and selling direct, enables it to make money selling books with lower unit sales. This business model aims to give authors high royalty rates and the opportunity to write on topics that standard publishers tend to avoid.

In 2018, Packt's revenue reached 18.4 million pounds, a 28% increase over the previous year, attributed to increased market share over the period.

In 2019, Packt stated it had published 6,500 books over its 16 years of operation.

== Books ==
Packt offers printed version of their books shipped to Europe, North America and selected Asian countries. In addition, they offer PDF versions of all of their books for download and in August 2010 began offering them in ePub and Mobi format. These eBooks were made free from digital rights management in March 2009. Packt books are also available via the Perlego platform, while some (but not all) are accessible on the Safari Books Online system.

== Packt Enterprise and Packt Open Source ==
In April 2010, Packt launched two new brands, Packt Enterprise and Packt Open Source, with the release of Microsoft Silverlight 4 Data and Services Cookbook and Moodle 1.9 Theme Design. Packt Enterprise focuses on technologies produced by businesses for use in other corporations, while Packt Open Source focuses on technologies built around open source licences.

These two brands do not encompass all of Packt's books, and it will continue to publish into areas which are not necessarily classifiable as open source or enterprise

== Open source project royalties ==
Packt supports and promotes open source projects and concepts. When a book written on an open source project is sold, Packt pays a royalty directly to that project. This scheme has resulted in the company providing sustainable revenues to many of the open source projects since 2004.

In March 2011, following its 'Believe in Open Source campaign' Packt announced that its donations to Open Source projects have surpassed the $300,000 mark.
