= BibliU =

- Type: Private
- Industry: Education Technology
- Founded: 2013; 13 years ago
- Headquarters: London, United Kingdom
- Area served: Global
- Key people: David Sherwood, CEO
- Products: eTextbooks; Online learning
- Number of employees: 80+

BibliU is an education technology company, specialising in digital textbook and monograph provision for universities, libraries and other higher education institutions. BibliU is currently partnered with over 130 higher education institutions globally, including the University of Coventry, University of Liverpool and the University of Phoenix.

BibliU was founded in 2013 by former Rhodes Scholar David Sherwood, while he was studying at Oxford University. He cofounded the company with current CTO Daniel Engelke, Tao Mantaras, Ryan White, and Ellis Gecan at the Oxford University startup incubator.

== Platform ==
The company provides e-textbooks to students by negotiating with core book publishers to give access to students and academics at reduced prices. Textbook packages are integrated into school library management systems and packages are adjusted according to a schools' reading lists. The company also has a subscription service for university libraries to make textbook packages searchable in their databases. The first field in which the company had a significant portion of the available textbooks for offer was chemistry, though its provision has expanded significantly into other fields in recent years.

== Funding history ==
In 2018, the company received $4 million in funding from the University of Oxford Innovation Fund III. In 2020, the company received an additional $10m (USD) in Series A funding, with the investment round led by Nesta Impact Investments, who announced that "BibliU is playing a leading role in the digital transformation of higher education and seeks to support inclusive access to educational content. BibliU offers all students more cost-effective access to their course materials and in formats that are inclusive and accessible."

BibliU's successful Series A funding round, taking place at the height of the COVID-19 pandemic and associated economic fallout was covered extensively by Sky News, EdSurge, and Forbes, among others.

== Leadership ==
As of September 2020, BibliU's Board of directors consists of the following individuals,

- Dave Sherwood, CEO and Co-Founder
- Daniel Engelke, CTO and Co-Founder
- Mark Whitby, Chairman and former SVP at Seagate Technology

== See also ==
- Perlego
- Education Technology
- Open Educational Resources
