= Cambridge University Press =

Publishing arm of the University of Cambridge

Coordinates: 52.1882°N 0.1320°E

- Founded: 1534; 492 years ago
- Founder: Henry VIII
- Successor: Cambridge University Press and Assessment
- Country of origin: Kingdom of England (since 1534)
- Headquarters location: Cambridge, England
- Distribution: Self-distributed; Ingram Content Group (US fulfillment); DHL Supply Chain (UK fulfillment)
- Key people: Deborah Prentice (vice chancellor); Peter Phillips (CEO)
- Nonfiction topics: Humanities; social sciences; science; medicine; engineering and technology; English language teaching and learning; education; Bibles
- Fiction genres: Academic; Educational
- Imprints: Cambridge University Press
- Official website: cambridge.org/universitypress

Cambridge University Press is the university press of the University of Cambridge. Granted letters patent by King Henry VIII in 1534, it is the oldest university press in the world. Cambridge University Press merged with Cambridge Assessment to form Cambridge University Press and Assessment under Queen Elizabeth II's approval in August 2021. However, the Press retains an independent existence within the larger entity.

With a global sales presence, publishing hubs, and offices in more than 40 countries, it has published over 50,000 titles by authors from over 100 countries. Its publications include more than 420 academic journals, monographs, reference works, school and university textbooks, and English language teaching and learning publications. It also publishes Bibles, runs a bookshop in Cambridge, sells through Amazon, and has a conference venues business in Cambridge at the Pitt Building and the Sir Geoffrey Cass Sports and Social Centre. It also serves as the King's Printer.

Cambridge University Press, as part of the University of Cambridge, is a non-profit organization. Cambridge University Press joined The Association of American Publishers trade organization in the Hachette v. Internet Archive lawsuit which resulted in the removal of access to over 500,000 books from global readers.

== History ==
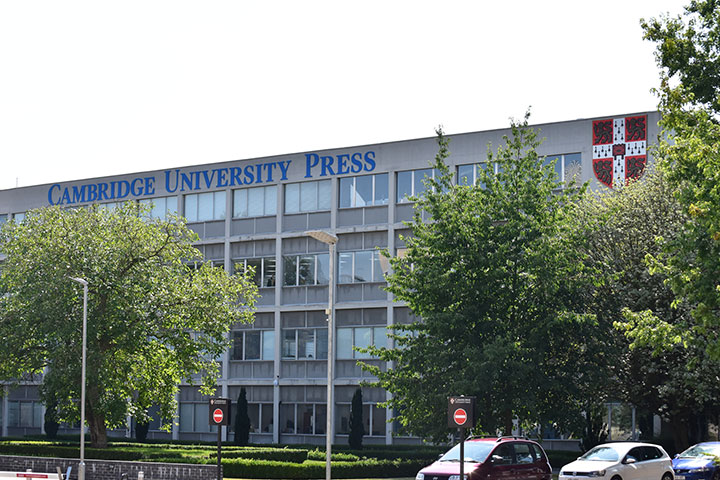
Cambridge University Press head office in Cambridge

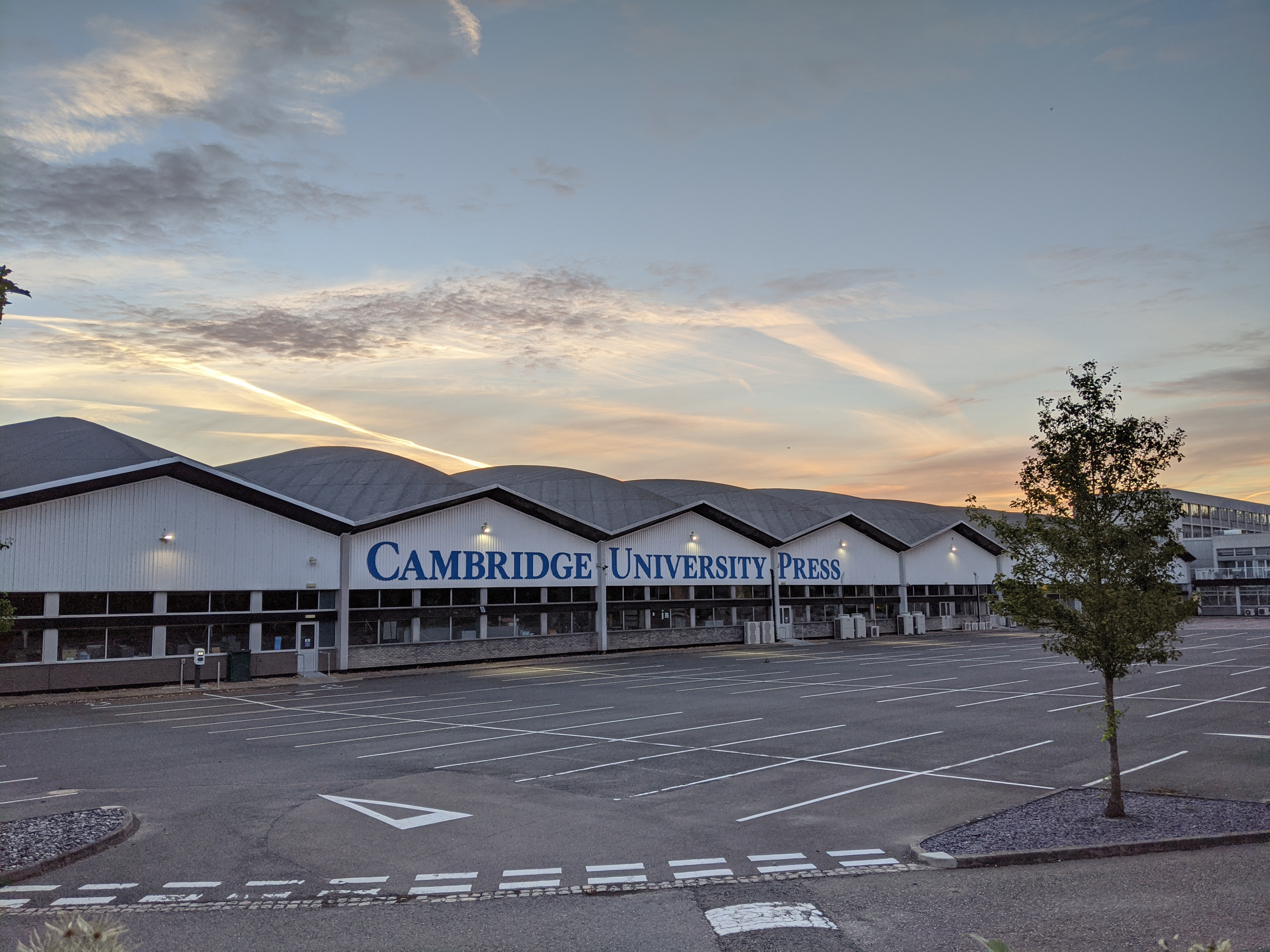
Cambridge University Press building in Cambridge

Cambridge University Press is the oldest university press in the world. It originated from letters patent granted to the University of Cambridge by Henry VIII in 1534. Cambridge was one of the two privileged presses (the other being Oxford University Press). Authors published by Cambridge have included John Milton, William Harvey, Isaac Newton, Bertrand Russell, and Stephen Hawking.

University printing began in Cambridge when the first practising University Printer, Thomas Thomas, set up a printing house in 1584. The first publication was a book, Two Treatises of the Lord His Holie Supper. In 1591, the first Cambridge Bible was printed by John Legate, and in 1629, the Cambridge folio edition of the King James Bible was printed by Thomas and John Buck.

In July 1697, the Duke of Somerset made a loan of £200 to the university "towards the printing house and press," and James Halman, Registrary of the university, lent £100 for the same purpose.

A new home for the press, The Pitt Building, on Trumpington Street in the centre of Cambridge, was completed in 1833 and was designed by Edward Blore. It became a listed building in 1950.

In the early 1800s, the press pioneered the development of stereotype printing, allowing successive printings from one setting. The press began using steam-powered machine presses by the 1850s. It was in this period that the press turned down what later became the Oxford English Dictionary – a proposal for which was brought to Cambridge by James Murray before he turned to Oxford.

The press journals publishing programme began in 1893 with the Journal of Physiology, followed by the Journal of Hygiene and Biometrika. By 1910, the press had become a well-established journal publisher with a successful list that included its first humanities title, Modern Language Review. 1956 saw the first issue of the Journal of Fluid Mechanics.

In 1913, the Monotype system of hot-metal mechanised typesetting was introduced at the press.

In 1949, the press opened its first international branch in New York.

The press moved to its current site in Cambridge in 1963. The mid-century modern building, University Printing House, was constructed in 1961–1963. The building was designed by Beard, Bennett, Wilkins and Partners.

In 1975, the press launched its English language teaching publishing business.

In 1981, the press moved to a new site on Shaftsbury Road. The Edinburgh Building was purpose-built with an adjoining warehouse to accommodate the press's expansion. It was built in 1979–80 by International Design and Construction. The site was demolished in 2017 to make way for the construction of Cambridge Assessment's Triangle Building. In 1989, the press acquired the Bible and prayer-book publisher Eyre & Spottiswoode, which gave the press the title of The Queen's Printer.

In 1992, the press opened a bookshop at 1 Trinity Street, Cambridge, which was the oldest-known bookshop site in Britain, as books have been sold there since 1581. In 2008, the shop expanded into 27 Market Hill, where its specialist Education and English Language Teaching shop opened the following year. The press bookshop sells Press books as well as Cambridge souvenirs. In 1993, the Cass Centre was opened to provide sports and social facilities for employees and their families. In 1999, Cambridge Dictionaries Online was launched.

In 2012, the press sold its printing operation to MPG Books Group and now uses third parties around the world to provide its print publications. In 2019, the press released Cambridge Elements, where authors whose works are either too short to be printed as a book or too long to qualify as a journal article could have them published within 12 weeks.

In 2021, Cambridge University Press merged with Cambridge Assessment. The new organisation was called Cambridge University Press & Assessment. In 2022, Amira Bennison was elected chair of the Cambridge University Press academic committee, replacing Kenneth Armstrong.

Named printers at Cambridge University Press
Name	From	To
Thomas Thomas	1583	1588
John Legate	1588	before 1593
John Porter	before 1593	1606
Cantrell Legge	1606	before 1608
Thomas Brooke	before 1608	1622
Thomas Buck	1625	?
John Buck	?	1630
Francis Buck	1630	1632
Roger Daniel	1632	1650
John Legate	1650	1655
John Field	1655	1669
Matthew Whinn	1669	
John Hayes	1669	1680
John Peck	1680	1682
Hugh Martin	1682	1683
James Jackson	1683	1686
H Jenkes	1693	1697
Jonathan Pindar	1697	1705
Cornelius Crownfield	1705	1730
Mary Fenner, Thomas & John James	1734	1740
Joseph Bentham	1740	1758
John Baskerville	1758	1766
John Archdeacon	1766	1793
John Burges	1793	1802
John Deighton	1802	1804
Andrew Wilson	1804	1809
John Smith	1809	1836
John William Parker	1836	1854
George Seeley	1854	
Charles John Clay	1854	1882
John Clay	1882	1886
Charles Felix Clay	1886	1916
James Bennet Peace	1916	1923
Walter Lewis	1923	1945
Brooke Crutchley	1945	1974
Euan Phillips	1974	1976
Harris Myers	1976	1982
Geoffrey Cass	1982	1983
Philip Allin	1983	1991
Geoffrey Cass	1991	1992
Anthony K Wilson	1992	1999
Jeremy Mynott	1999	2002
Stephen Bourne	2002	2012
Peter Phillips	2011	

== Print and typographic heritage ==
=== People ===
- John Siberch, in 1521 the first printer in Cambridge
- John Baskerville (1707–1775), the official printer; his Cambridge edition of the King James Bible (1763) was considered his masterpiece
- Bruce Rogers (1870–1957), appointed 'printing expert' at the press for two years in 1917
- Stanley Morison (1889–1967), typographical advisor both to the press and to the Monotype Corporation from 1925 to 1954 and, from 1929, also to The Times newspaper
- John Dreyfus (1918–2002), joined the press in 1939 and became Assistant Printer in 1949
- David Kindersley (1915–1995), designed a special typeface, Meliorissimo, for the press's buildings, stationery, signs and vans
- John Peters (1917–1989), designer of Angelus (Monotype, 1954, a 4 1/2 point typeface for Bible composition at Cambridge University Press), Castellar (an open caps face, Monotype, 1954? or 1957), Fleet Titling (1967, Monotype Series 632), and Traveller (1964, a Monotype font done for the British Railways
- Gordon Johnson (1943–), chair of the Syndicate governing Cambridge University Press from 1981 to 2010. Sandars Reader in Bibliography in 2009–2010 and lectured on "From printer to publisher: Cambridge University Press transformed, 1950 to 2010."

=== Publications ===
- 1584: the press's first publication was a book, Two Treatises of the Lord His Holie Supper.
- 1591: the first Cambridge Bible was printed by John Legate
- 1629: Cambridge folio edition of the King James Bible was printed by Thomas and John Buck.
- 1633: The Temple by George Herbert (1593–1633) includes "Easter Wings". The poem's words and lines are arranged on the page to create a visual image of its subject.
- 1713: the second edition of Isaac Newton's Philosophiæ Naturalis Principia Mathematica was published by the press.
- 1763: John Baskerville's folio Bible, considered a masterpiece, uses his innovations with type, paper, ink, and the printing process.
- 1895: the first title by a Nobel Laureate was published: J. J. Thomson's Elements of the Mathematical Theory of Electricity and Magnetism.

== Open access ==
Cambridge University Press has stated its support for a sustainable transition to open access. It offers a range of open access publishing options under the heading of Cambridge Open, allowing authors to comply with the Gold Open Access and Green Open Access requirements of major research funders. It published Gold Open Access journals and books and works with publishing partners such as learned societies to develop Open Access for different communities. It supports Green Open Access (also called Green archiving) across its journals and monographs, allowing authors to deposit content in institutional and subject-specific repositories. It also supports sharing on commercial sharing sites through its Cambridge Core Share service.

In recent years it has entered into several Read & Publish Open Access agreements with university libraries and consortia in several countries, including a landmark agreement with the University of California. In its 2019 Annual Report, Cambridge University Press stated that it saw such agreements "as an important stepping stone in the transition to Open Access".

In 2019, the press joined with the University of Cambridge's research and teaching departments to give a unified response to Plan S, which calls for all publications resulting from publicly funded research to be published in compliant open access journals or platforms from 2020. The response emphasized Cambridge's commitment to an open access goal which works effectively for all academic disciplines, was financially sustainable for institutions and high-quality peer review, and which leads to an orderly transition.

The Press is a member of the Open Access Scholarly Publishing Association and the International Association of STM Publishers.

In 2023, more than 50 per cent of Cambridge University Press research articles were in open access mode.

== Nobel prize winners published by Cambridge University Press ==
- J. J. Thomson (Physics – 1906)
- Ernest Rutherford (Chemistry – 1908)
- Niels Bohr (Physics – 1922)
- Werner Heisenberg (Physics – 1932)
- Charles Scott Sherrington (Medicine – 1933)
- Erwin Schrödinger (Physics – 1935)
- James Chadwick (Physics – 1935)
- Patrick Blackett (Physics – 1948)
- John Cockcroft (Physics – 1951)
- Ernest Hemingway (Literature – 1954)
- Alexander R. Todd (Chemistry – 1957)
- Max Perutz (Chemistry – 1962)
- Eugene Wigner (Physics – 1963)
- Max Born (Physics – 1964)
- Nikolay Basov (Physics – 1964)
- Richard Feynman (Physics – 1965)
- Derek Barton (Chemistry – 1969)
- Samuel Beckett (Literature – 1969)
- Simon Kuznets (Economics – 1971)
- Dennis Gabor (Physics – 1971)
- Kenneth Arrow (Economics – 1972)
- Burton Richter (Physics – 1976)
- James Meade (Economics – 1977)
- Nevill Francis Mott (Physics – 1977)
- Herbert A. Simon (Economics – 1978)
- Steven Weinberg (Physics – 1979)
- Abdus Salam (Physics – 1979)
- Subramanyan Chandrasekhar (Physics – 1983)
- Gérard Debreu (Economics – 1983)
- Richard Stone (Economics – 1984)
- Franco Modigliani (Economics – 1985)
- James M. Buchanan (Economics – 1986)
- Wole Soyinka (Literature – 1986)
- Robert Solow (Economics – 1987)
- Pierre-Gilles de Gennes (Physics – 1991)
- Robert Fogel (Economics – 1993)
- Douglass North (Economics – 1993)
- Harry Kroto (Chemistry – 1996)
- William Vickrey (Economics – 1996)
- Claude Cohen-Tannoudji (Physics – 1997)
- William Phillips (Physics – 1997)
- Amartya Sen (Economics – 1998)
- Gerard 't Hooft (Physics – 1999)
- Martinus J. G. Veltman (Physics – 1999)
- James Heckman (Economics – 2000)
- George Akerlof (Economics – 2001)
- Joseph Stiglitz (Economics – 2001)
- Daniel Kahneman (Economics – 2002)
- Vernon L. Smith (Economics – 2002)
- Clive Granger (Economics – 2003)
- Anthony James Leggett (Physics – 2003)
- Edmund Phelps (Economics – 2006)
- Leonid Hurwicz (Economics – 2007)
- Intergovernmental Panel on Climate Change (Peace Prize – 2007)
- Elinor Ostrom (Economics – 2009)
- Thomas A. Steitz (Chemistry – 2009)
- Christopher A. Pissarides (Economics – 2010)
- Peter Diamond (Economics – 2010)
- Christopher A. Sims (Economics – 2011)
- Alvin E. Roth (Economics – 2012)
- Angus Deaton (Economics – 2015)
- Kip Thorne (Physics – 2017)
- Joachim Frank (Chemistry – 2017)
- William Nordhaus (Economics – 2018)

== Organisational governance and operational structure ==
=== Relationship with the University of Cambridge ===
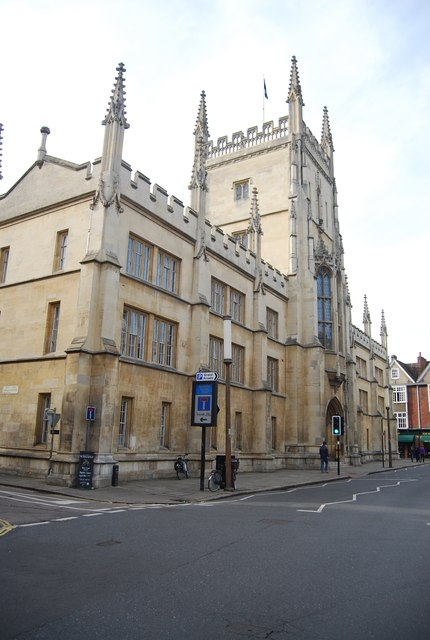
The Pitt Building in Cambridge, which used to be the headquarters of Cambridge University Press, is now a conference venue.

Cambridge University Press was a non-teaching department of the University of Cambridge. The press has, since 1698, been governed by the press 'Syndics' (originally known as the 'Curators'), 18 senior members of the University of Cambridge who, along with other non-executive directors, bring a range of subject and business expertise. The Chair of the syndicate in 2021 was Professor Stephen Toope (Vice-Chancellor of the University of Cambridge). The syndicate has delegated its powers to a Press & Assessment Board; and to an Academic Publishing Committee and an English Language Teaching & Education Publishing Committee.

The Press & Assessment Board is responsible for setting overarching strategic direction. The Publishing Committees provide quality assurance and formal approval of the publishing strategy.

The operational responsibility of the press was delegated by the Syndics to the Secretary of the Syndicate and the Chief Executive.

=== Operational structure ===
Until August 2021, Cambridge University Press had three publishing groups:

- Academic Publishing: published research books and journals in science, technology, medicine, humanities, and the social sciences. It also published advanced learning materials and reference content as well as 380 journals, of which 43 are 'Gold' Open Access. Open Access articles now account for 15 per cent of articles. The group also published Bibles, and the press was one of only two publishers entitled to publish the Book of Common Prayer and the King James Version of the Bible in England.
- English Language Teaching: published English language teaching courses and resources for learners of all ages around the world. It offers a suite of integrated learning and assessment tools underpinned by the Cambridge Curriculum, a systematic approach to learning and evaluating proficiency in English. It works closely with Cambridge Assessment through the joint initiative Cambridge Exams Publishing.
- Education: delivers educational products, services and software for primary, secondary and international schools. It collaborates with Cambridge Assessment and the University of Cambridge Faculty of Education to help countries such as Kazakhstan and Oman to improve their education systems. It also works with Cambridge Assessment to reach more schools and develop new products and services that improve teaching and learning. This area was merging with the schools team at Cambridge Assessment

From 1 August 2021 onwards, Cambridge University Press became solely the academic and bible publishing division of Cambridge University Press & Assessment. The English and education arms of the organisation merged with the equivalent departments of Cambridge Assessment to form new, merged divisions.

== Partnerships and acquisitions ==
- 2011, formed a partnership with Cambridge Assessment to publish official Cambridge preparation materials for Cambridge English and IELTS examinations.
- 2015, formed a strategic content and technology partnership with Edmodo, the world's most extensive e-learning platform for primary and secondary teachers and pupils, to bring premier educational content and technology to schools in the United Kingdom.
- 2017, the University of Cambridge announced that Cambridge University Press and Cambridge Assessment would work more closely in future under governance by the Press & Assessment Board.
- 2019, with Cambridge Assessment English acquired the Centre for Evaluation and Monitoring from Durham. CEM provides assessments to measure learner progress and potential, as well as 11 Plus exams for many UK independent and grammar schools.
- 2020, partnered with EDUCATE Ventures, the University College London edtech accelerator, to better understand the challenges and successes of home education during the lockdown.
- 2020, partnered with online library Perlego to offer students access to digital textbooks.
- 2020, the University Cambridge announced it would create a "new unified organization" by merging Cambridge University Press and Cambridge Assessment, to launch 1 August 2021.
- 2021, Cambridge Assessment and Cambridge University Press formally became one organisation under the name Cambridge University Press & Assessment.

== Digital developments ==
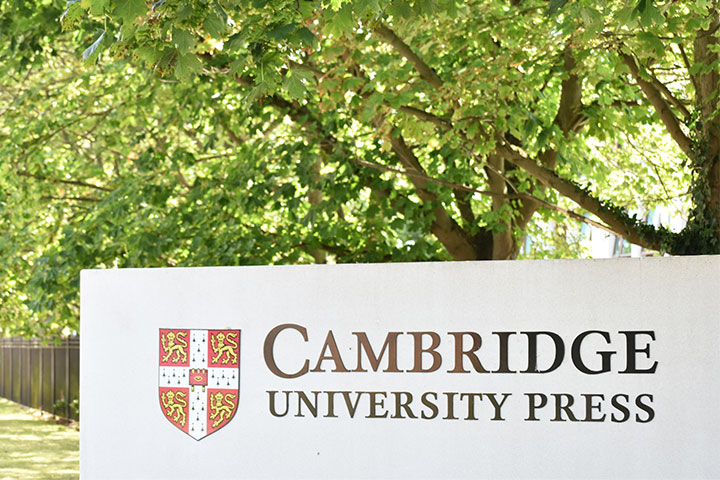
Cambridge University Press sign at the Cambridge headquarters

In 2011, Cambridge University Press adopted SAP software. Cambridge University Press works closely with IT services firm Tech Mahindra on SAP, and with Cognizant and Wipro on other systems.

In 2016, Cambridge Books Online and Cambridge Journals Online were replaced by Cambridge Core – a single platform to access its publishing ("the home of academic content from Cambridge University Press"). It provided significantly enhanced interfaces and upgraded navigation capabilities, as well as article-level and chapter-level content selection. A year after Cambridge Core went live, the press launched Cambridge Core Share, functionality to allow users to generate and share links with free access to selected journal articles, an early sign of the press's commitment to open research.

In 2020, Cambridge University Press partnered with online library Perlego to offer students access to digital textbooks.

In 2021, the press acquired CogBooks. The technology adapts and responds to users, "recommending course material needed to optimise learning".

In 2021, the press began migrating its website onto Drupal.

== Controversies ==
=== Tax exemption controversy ===
In May 1940, CUP applied to the Inland Revenue for the exemption of its printing and publishing profits from taxation, equivalent to charitable status. After a November 1940 Inland Revenue hearing, CUP's application was refused "on the ground that, since the Press was printing and publishing for the outside world and not simply for the internal use of the University, the Press's trade went beyond the purpose and objects of the University and (in terms of the Act) was not exercised in the course of the actual carrying out of a primary purpose of the University". In November 1975, with CUP facing financial collapse, CUP's chief executive Geoffrey Cass wrote a 60-page "preliminary letter" to the Inland Revenue again seeking tax-exemption. A year later Cass's application was granted in a letter from the Inland Revenue, though the decision was not made public. After consulting CUP, Cambridge's 'sister' press, the giant Oxford University Press presented their own submission and received similar exemption. In 2003 OUP's tax exemption was publicly attacked by Joel Rickett of The Bookseller in The Guardian. In 2007, with the new 'public benefit' requirement of the revised Charities Act, the issue was re-examined with particular reference to the OUP. In 2008 CUP's and OUP's privilege was attacked by rival publishers. In 2009 The Guardian invited author Andrew Malcolm to write an article on the subject.

In 2007, from the National Archives at Kew, Malcolm obtained scans of CUP's unsuccessful applications for tax-exemption made in the 1940s and 1950s and their later successful applications in the 1970s. He then indexed and posted these on the Akmedea website. Late in 2020, the papers held at Kew were withdrawn from public access and ruled closed for 50 years until 1 January 2029. This rendered the scans on the website their only public source.

In 2021, the documents were cited in a discussion on the formation of Cambridge University Press & Assessment reported in the Cambridge University Reporter. D.D.K. Chow of Trinity College, expressed concerns about the lack of academic leadership of the new body:

"For 323 years, the Press has been tightly controlled under the University's academic leadership through the Press Syndicate (formerly Curators)...However, the Council's report proposes a Press and Assessment Syndicate, without such academic leadership....The proposed change in composition of the Syndicate...is in stark contrast to the arguments used by the Press to obtain its current tax exemption. In a landmark letter to the Inland Revenue in 1975, Sir Geoffrey Cass, then Chief Executive of the Press, wrote: "The Press of Cambridge University is actually no more than a department of the University, with no independent status of its own, governed by academic senior members of the University" and that it was not "an almost semi-independent 'international publisher'....Without adequate academic leadership, it would be all too easy for commercial concerns to override academic values, removing public benefit....If the Regent House does zippo to provide leadership on the Press and Assessment Syndicate, treating Cambridge University Press and Cambridge Assessment as cash cows, there is little reason for the University to continue owning them."

=== Alms for Jihad ===
In 2007, controversy arose over the press's decision to destroy all remaining copies of its 2006 book Alms for Jihad: Charity and Terrorism in the Islamic World, by Burr and Collins, as part of the settlement of a lawsuit brought by Saudi billionaire Khalid bin Mahfouz. Within hours, Alms for Jihad became one of the 100 most sought after titles on Amazon.com and eBay in the United States. The press sent a letter to libraries asking them to remove copies from circulation. The press subsequently sent out copies of an "errata" sheet for the book.

The American Library Association issued a recommendation to libraries still holding Alms for Jihad: "Given the intense interest in the book, and the desire of readers to learn about the controversy first hand, we recommend that U.S. libraries keep the book available for their users." The publisher's decision did not have the support of the book's authors and was criticized by some who claimed it was incompatible with freedom of speech and with freedom of the press and that it indicated that English defamation laws were excessively strict. In the New York Times Book Review (7 October 2007), United States Congressman Frank R. Wolf described Cambridge's settlement as "basically a book burning". The press pointed out that, at that time, it had already sold most of its copies of the book.

The press defended its actions, saying it had acted responsibly and that it was a global publisher with a duty to observe the laws of many different countries.

=== Cambridge University Press v. Patton ===
In this case, originally filed in 2008, CUP et al. accused Georgia State University of infringement of copyright. The case closed on 29 September 2020, with GSU as the prevailing party.

=== The China Quarterly ===
On 18 August 2017, following an "instruction" from a Chinese import agency, Cambridge University Press used the functionality that had been built into Cambridge Core to temporarily delete politically sensitive articles from The China Quarterly on its Chinese website. The articles focused on topics China regards as taboo, including the 1989 Tiananmen Square massacre, Mao Zedong's Cultural Revolution, the 2014 Hong Kong protests, and ethnic tensions in Xinjiang and Tibet. On 21 August 2017, in the face of growing international protests, Cambridge University Press announced it would immediately repost the articles to uphold the principle of academic freedom on which the university's work was founded.

In a discussion reported in the Cambridge University Reporter, D.K.K. Chow declared, "Without academic leadership on the matter, the University's basic ethical values were cast aside by commercial considerations. This instigated public debate, which would have been avoided had academic leadership been more vigilant, causing unnecessary damage to the University's reputation. The Press statement explained that lack of academic leadership was to blame: 'This decision was taken as a temporary measure pending discussion with the academic leadership of the University.'"

=== The Cambridge Handbook of Privatization ===
In February 2021, the forthcoming Cambridge Handbook of Privatization was found to have included a chapter by J. Mark Ramseyer in which he described Koreans murdered in the Kantō Massacre of 1923 as "gangs" that "torched buildings, planted bombs, [and] poisoned water supplies". Editors Avihay Dorfman and Alon Harel acknowledged the historical distortions of the chapter, but gave Ramseyer a chance to revise. Harel described the inclusion of the original chapter as an "innocent and very regrettable" mistake on the part of the editors.

== Corporate social responsibility ==
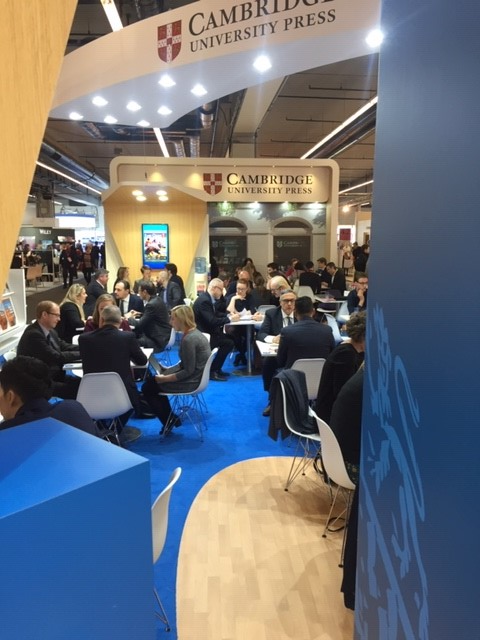
CUP stand at the Frankfurt Book Fair 2018

=== Community ===
The Press undertakes community engagement in Cambridge and around the world where there are Press employees. Annually, the press selects a UK Charity of the Year, which has included local charities Centre 33 (2016 and 2017), Rowan Humberstone (2018), and Castle School (2019). In 2016, some of the press's community works included its continued support to Westchester Community College in New York, the installation of hygienic facilities in an Indonesian rural school, raising funds to rehabilitate earthquake-stricken schools in Nepal, and guiding students from Coleridge Community College, Cambridge in a CV workshop. On World Book Day 2016, the press held a digital Shakespeare publishing workshop for students and their teachers. Similarly, their Indian office conducted a workshop for teachers and students in 17 schools in Delhi to learn the whole process of book publishing. The press donated more than 75,000 books in 2016.

An apprenticeship programme for people interested in careers in publishing was established in 2016; by 2022 it had 200 active apprentices in the UK in a wide range of roles.

=== Environment ===
The Press monitors its emissions annually, has converted to energy-saving equipment, minimizes plastic use and ensures that their paper was sourced ethically.

In 2019, the World Wildlife Fund awarded its highest score to the press of Three Trees, based on the press's timber purchasing policy, performance statement and its responsible sourcing of timber. The press won the Independent Publishers Guild Independent Publishing Awards for sustainability in 2020 and in 2021. Its public commitments to sustainability include being a signatory of the UN Global Compact and to the goals of the Cambridge Zero initiative run by the University of Cambridge – to being carbon zero on all energy-related emissions by 2048.

Cambridge University Press was a signatory of the SDG Publishers Compact, and has taken steps to support the achievement of the Sustainable Development Goals (SDGs) in the publishing industry. These include publishing a new set of open access journals known as Cambridge Prisms, relevant to the SDGs, that includes Coastal Futures, Precision Medicine, Global Mental Health, Extinction, Plastics, Water and Drylands. Cambridge also worked with the Association of Learned and Professional Society Publishers (ALPSP) to create the University Press Redux Sustainability Award in 2020. The inaugural award was given to the Organisation for Economic Co-operation and Development (OECD) for its SDG Pathfinder, an open-access digital discovery tool for finding content and data relating to the SDGs.
