= John Legate =

English printer

John Legate (died 1620?) was an English printer.

== Biography ==
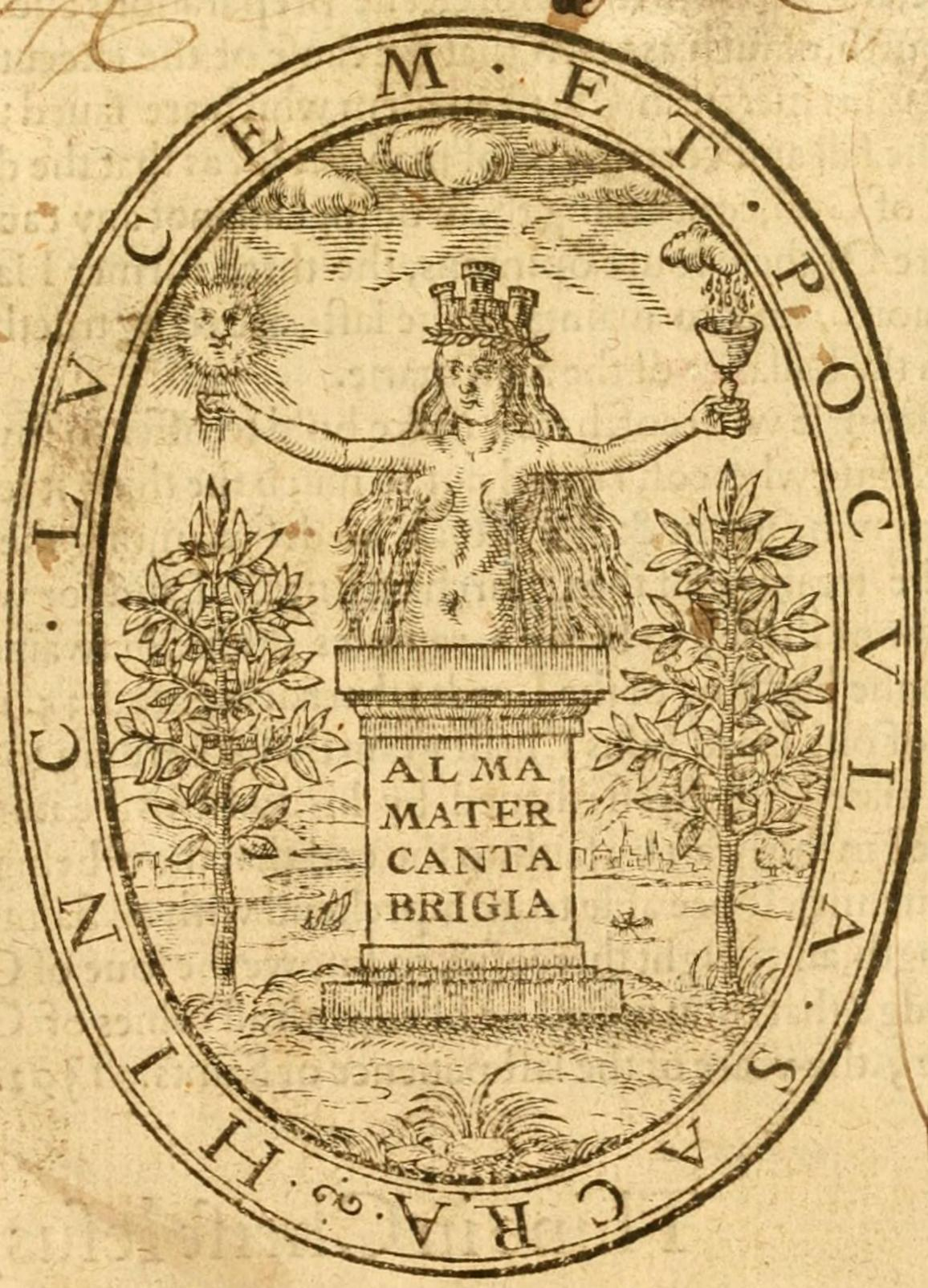
Legate's Alma Mater for the University of Cambridge, written in 1600

Legate was admitted and sworn a freeman of the Stationers' Company on 11 April 1586 (Arber, ii. 696). He was appointed printer to the University of Cambridge by grace, on 2 November 1588, as ‘he is reported to be skilful in the art of printing books.’ On 26 April 1589 he received as an apprentice Cantrell Legge, afterwards also university printer and his immediate successor in the conduct of the press at Cambridge. From 1590 to 1609 he appeared in the parish books of the Church of St Mary the Great, Cambridge, as paying 5s. a year for the rent of a shop. In 1609 he was elected churchwarden, and paid a fine of 10s. for his ‘dismission.’ The respective rights of the Company of Stationers and of the university were at this time not well defined, and there were frequent differences between them. By the help of their chancellor the rights of the university and of their printer were successfully defended, and in 1597 an entry in the ‘Stationers' Registers’ (ib. iii. 88) shows that the stationers acknowledged Legate's right to copyright protection for a book printed by the authority of the vice-chancellor, ‘so that none of this company shall prynt yt from hym.’ Legate had the exclusive right to print the Latin dictionary of Thomas Thomas, his predecessor as university printer, a right renewed to his children after his death, and he also printed most of the books of William Perkins.

The earliest documented use of the term alma mater to refer to a university is in 1600, when Legate began using an emblem for the university press. The first-known appearance of the device is on the title-page of a book by William Perkins, A Golden Chain, where the Latin phrase Alma Mater Cantabrigia ("nourishing mother Cambridge") is inscribed on a pedestal bearing a lactating woman wearing a mural crown.

Legate left Cambridge about 1609. In 1612 he was described on the title page of one of his books as living at Trinity Lane (between Old Fish Street and Bow Lane), London. On 21 August 1620 an entry appears in the ‘Stationers' Registers’ (ib. iv. 45) of forty-two books transferred to John Legate the younger, ‘the copies of John Legate, his father, lately deceased,’ and of these no less than twenty-six are by Perkins. This entry is the only evidence we have of the year of his death. On 4 February 1588–9 he married, at St Mary the Great, Cambridge, Alice Sheirs, and between 17 January 1589–90 and 9 July 1609 the baptism of nine daughters and three sons, and the death of one infant daughter, appear in the registers of that parish. He is said by Ames (Typ. Ant. p. 462) to have married Agatha, daughter of Christopher Barker, queen's printer; and according to Nichols (Lit. Illustr. iv. 164) Agatha, daughter of Robert Barker. If these statements apply to the elder Legate, he must have married a second wife after he left Cambridge.

John Legate the younger (1600–1658), his eldest son, was baptised in the parish of St Mary the Great, Cambridge, on 8 June 1600, was admitted freeman of the Stationers' Company on 6 September 1619, and on the death of his father in the following year succeeded to his business. He was included in the list of authorised London printers in the Star-chamber decrees in 1637, and again in 1648. He was appointed one of the Cambridge University printers by grace on 5 July 1650, probably in succession to Roger Daniel, but his patent was cancelled for neglect on 10 October 1655. He died, ‘distempered in his senses,’ at Little Wood Street, London, 4 November 1658 (R. Smyth, Obituary, Camd. Soc.). In the parish registers of St Botolph's Church, Cambridge, 25 June 1642, is a marriage of John Legate to Elizabeth Grime. This in all probability concerns the younger Legate.
