= Education World Forum =

- Genre: Seminar
- Frequency: Annually
- Location: London
- Country: England
- Inaugurated: 2002
- Most recent: 2026
- Participants: Ministers and policy makers

The Education World Forum is the largest annual gathering of education and skills ministers in the world. It is held in London each year. The Education World Forum brings together Ministers of Education, Higher Education and Skills, their advisors and delegations from across the world to address key issues and to share the education system challenges they face, the solutions they have found, the learning that has occurred and the successes they have achieved. The 2026 Education World Forum was held in London from 17 to 20 May 2026.

Although an international event, the Forum is supported by the Foreign Commonwealth and Development Office, the Department for Education, the Department for Business and Trade and the British Council.

== History ==
Founded in 2002 the Education World Forum was initially named 'Moving Young Minds' and the event was run by the governmental organisation Becta (British Educational Communications Technology Agency). It was renamed the "Learning and Technology World Forum" in 2009.

Following the May 2010 post-election spending review, the event was taken over by the Education World Forum and renamed as such, broadening its programme to encompass higher education and skills. Ministerial delegates representing over two thirds of the world's population attend the event each year.
