= Perlego =

Digital online library

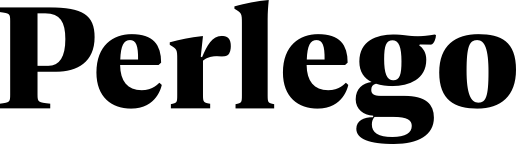
- Industry: Education
- Founded: 2017; 9 years ago
- Founders: Gauthier Van Malderen; Matthew Davis
- Headquarters: London, UK
- Key people: Gauthier van Malderen, CEO; Matthew Davis, CTO
- Website: perlego.com

Perlego is a digital library that offers readers unlimited access to over 1.3 million academic, professional and non-fiction ebooks. Described as the "Spotify for textbooks" by the Evening Standard, it is a membership-based service that allows users to read any book available in the library for the duration of their membership.

Perlego offers ebooks in 8 languages: English, Spanish, Italian, German, French, Portuguese, Swedish and Dutch, from local and international publishers. The service is available worldwide and allows users to read both online and offline on most smartphones, tablets or laptop devices.

== History ==
Perlego was founded in 2017 in London, United Kingdom, by Gauthier Van Malderen and Matthew Davis, both Belgian natives and recent university graduates. Drawing from their personal experiences with the high and rising cost of university textbooks, and noting the convenience of accessing music and films via subscription models like Netflix and Spotify, the founders aimed to increase global access to academic resources. They did this by offering students an "all-you-can-read" subscription model, providing a more affordable and convenient alternative to purchasing new textbooks while aiding publishers in reclaiming market share lost to online piracy.

In January 2025, Perlego was listed in the Sunday Times ranking of the 100 fastest-growing technology firms in the UK.

=== Funding ===
Perlego was initially self-funded. Its pre-seed funding was derived from the profit made from Gauthier's previous business venture – Iconic Matter. In January 2017, Perlego raised £850,000 in a round of seed funding. This was led by angel investors from the UK, Belgium and France, with Zoopla founder Alex Chesterman and LoveFilm founder Simon Franks being notable participants. In September 2018, Perlego raised a further £3,500,000 in a venture round led by Accelerated Digital Ventures, with further participation from its existing angel investors. In November 2019, Perlego closed its Series A fundraising round, having raised a total of £7,000,000. The fundraising was led by Charlie Songhurst, Dedicated VC, and Thomas Leysen (Chairman of Mediahuis and Umicore), with Perlego's existing investors all reinvesting on a pro-rata basis. In March 2022, Perlego closed its Series B fundraising round, raising $50,000,000. The round was led by Mediahuis Ventures. In October 2024, Perlego announced a $20,000,000 fundraising led by Sir Terry Leahy, the former Tesco CEO.

== Services ==
In 2023, Perlego's digital library contained over one million academic e-textbooks in eight languages, covering more than 900 disciplines from aeronautics to zoology. At the moment Perlego works with over 9,000 publishers who provide content for the service, including major academic publishers such as Wiley and Bloomsbury.

Users can access titles via their browser on desktop computers or download an application on mobile devices where it is also possible to download books for offline reading. Study tools include highlights, making notes and the text-to-speech feature Read Aloud. In 2024, Perlego launched two artificial intelligence tools, Smart Search and AI Researcher.

Perlego partnered with the University of West London in 2022 to provide its full catalogue to its students. September 2024 saw Perlego launch a partnership with the University of Leeds, a Russell Group member that serves nearly 40,000 students, to offer unlimited access to its digital library. In 2025, Perlego launched a partnership with Westcliff University in the US.
