= Good Shepherd Convent =

Good Shepherd Convent or Convent of the Good Shepherd may refer to:

- any convent of the Congregation of Our Lady of Charity of the Good Shepherd
- Good Shepherd Convent, Colombo, school
- Good Shepherd Convent, Chennai, school
- Good Shepherd Convent, Shahdol, school
- Convent of the Good Shepherd, Finchley, former reformatory
