= HCJ =

HCJ may refer to:

- Hague Convention on Jurisdiction
- Handcrafting Justice, an American fair trade organization
- Heathcote Junction railway station, in Victoria, Australia
- Hechi Jinchengjiang Airport, in Guangxi, China
- High Council of Justice (disambiguation)
- High Court of Justice (disambiguation)
