= Good Shepherd Convent, Kandy =

Location
- Peradeniya Road, Kandy, Sri Lanka; 20000; 7°17′29″N 80°37′49″E

Information
- School type: Semi-Government
- Motto: Latin: Fortiter et Suaviter (Strength and Sweetness)
- Religious affiliation: Christianity
- Denomination: Roman Catholic
- Patron saint: Saint Mary Euphrasia
- Established: 1889; 137 years ago
- Founders: Sister Mary of St. Magdalence de Pazzi Walsh, Sister Mary of St. Constance
- Sister school: Good Shepherd Convent, Colombo; St. Bridget's Convent, Colombo
- Principal: Sudarika Fernando
- Grades: Nursery and 1 - 13
- Gender: Girls
- Age: 2 to 18
- Enrollment: 1600
- Education system: GCE Sri Lanka
- Language: English, Sinhala, Tamil
- Houses: St. Brigids; St. Helenas; St. Lucias; St. Marguerites; St. Terasitas
- Colors: Blue and white
- Alumni name: Shepherdians
- Brother School: St. Anthony's College, Kandy
- Website: https://www.goodshepherdconventkandy.org

Good Shepherd Convent, Kandy, is a semi-government fee-levying Roman Catholic girls' school in Kandy, Sri Lanka. The convent was established by Sister Mary of St. Magdalence de Pazzi Walsh and Sister Mary of St. Constance in February 1889.

== Principals ==
Name of the Principals (In Chronological Order)
Name	Starting Year	Leaving Year	Notes
Mary Gertrude	1889		
Mary Constance Phelan		1907	
Mary Ferrier Allan			
Mary Aidan Howlett			
Mary Alibe Cosgrave			
Mary Cuthbert M. Connel			
Mary Claver Shanley			
Mother Mary of St. Joseph Deegan		April 1963	Last Irish principal
Mary Agnes de Alwis	May 1963		First Sri Lankan principal
Mary Carmeline Jayaweera	1972	1974	
J. I. Jayasekara	1974		Acting principal
Mary Laetitia Cooray	1975	1985	
Mary Thomas de Cruz	1986		
Mary Lalani Gunawardena			
Mary Laetitia Cooray			
Mary Marjory Silva			
Mary Alexandra Mendis			
Chandrika Perera			
Sudarika Fernando			Current principal
