= Lakmali =

Lakmali or Lakmalee (Sinhala: ලක්මාලි, romanized: Lakmāli) is a feminine given name of Sinhalese origin. Notable people with the name include:

== Lakmalee ==
- Chandrika Lakmalee (born 1978), Sri Lankan cricketer

== Lakmali ==
- Lakmali Karunanayake, Sri Lankan judge of the Court of Appeal
- Nadeeka Lakmali Bambarenda Liyanage (born 1978), Sri Lankan athlete
