= Shanthi Sachithanandam =

Sri Lankan women's rights activist, human rights activist and political critic

Shanthi Sachithanandam (Tamil: சாந்தி சச்சிதானந்தம், romanized: Cānti Caccitāṉantam) was a Sri Lankan human rights activist, social activist, political activist, architect, researcher and writer.

== Biography ==
Shanthi was born in Echchamodai, Jaffna. She later relocated to Colombo. She pursued her primary and secondary education at the St. Bridget's Convent, Colombo. She was also one of the victims of the 1983 Black July riots, where she recounted experiences over her belongings and documents being set ablaze by mobs and rioters.

== Career ==
She pursued her higher education at the University of Moratuwa in the architecture faculty. During her higher studies at the University of Moratuwa, she faced challenges pertaining to mingling with fellow peers who were segregated by different political ideologies. She had to separate herself from having political discourse with Sinhala JVP students and Tamil students who had separate Nationalist politics. She later transformed herself as a bold speaker, taking a stance against ragging in college during her first year, and she earned the wrath of other senior students. She was also a vocal critic of the then executive President J. R. Jayawardene, as she condemned him for encouraging police brutality as a punishment against college students who had been accused of ragging.

Despite graduating with a degree in the field of Architecture, she showed her interest towards community service and political activism. She advocated for the rights of Tamil women in Sri Lanka who were impacted by the Sri Lankan Civil War by initiating social welfare programs catering to the requirements of women. She formed Viluthu Centre for Human Resource Development, a non-governmental organization and she served as its Executive Director for a long stint. She was also the founder of ‘Mantru’, a non-governmental organization based in Batticaloa, where she engaged in numerous social development projects catering to the Eastern Province.

As an author, she had also published articles criticising the contemporary political events and the political inaction of the Sri Lankan government through various forums and journals. During her early years, she also worked as a coordinator at the United Nations Office. She contested at the 2010 Sri Lankan parliamentary election from the Batticaloa Electoral District as an independent candidate.

== Death ==
She died on 27 August 2015 after a long battle with cancer at the age of 58.
