= Mary Doyle (disambiguation) =

Mary Doyle (born 1970) is an Australian politician.

Mary Doyle may also refer to:

- Mary Doyle (actor) (1931–1995), American actress
- Mary Joyce Doyle (1923–2016), American nun and librarian
- Mary Matthew Doyle (1870–1960), American Roman Catholic nun and university administrator
- Mary of St Joseph Doyle (1835–1869), Irish-born Australian Roman Catholic nun

== See also ==
- Mary Doyle Curran (1917–1981), American poet, novelist, and teacher
