= Karunanayake =

Karunanayake is a surname. Notable people with the surname include:

- Kamal Karunanayake (1937–2006), Sri Lankan politician
- Lakmali Karunanayake, Sri Lankan judge of the Court of Appeal
- Nipun Karunanayake (born 1991), Sri Lankan cricketer
- Ravi Karunanayake (born 1963), Sri Lankan politician
- Shalika Karunanayake (born 1987), Sri Lankan cricketer
