= List of statutory rules of Northern Ireland, 2013 =

This is a list of statutory rules made in the Northern Ireland in the year 2013.

== 1-100 ==
Number	Title
1	The Mussels (Prohibition of Fishing) Regulations (Northern Ireland) 2013
2	The Employment and Support Allowance (Amendment) Regulations (Northern Ireland) 2013
3	Electricity (Priority Dispatch) (Amendment) Regulations (Northern Ireland) 2013
4	The Single Use Carrier Bags Charge Regulations (Northern Ireland) 2013
5	The Road Traffic (Fixed Penalty) (Offences) (Amendment) Order (Northern Ireland) 2013
6	The Road Traffic (Fixed Penalty) (Amendment) Order (Northern Ireland) 2013
7	The Plant Health (Amendment) Order (Northern Ireland) 2013
8	The Parking Places (Disabled Persons’ Vehicles) (Amendment) Order (Northern Ireland) 2013
9	The Waiting Restrictions (Holywood) (Amendment) Order (Northern Ireland) 2013
10	The Roads (Classification) Order (Northern Ireland) 2013
11	The Waiting Restrictions (Fivemiletown) Order (Northern Ireland) 2013
12	The Energy Performance of Buildings (Certificates and Inspections) (Amendment) Regulations (Northern Ireland) 2013
13	The Waiting Restrictions (John Street, Castlederg) (Amendment) Order (Northern Ireland) 2013
14	The Parking Places, Loading Bays and Waiting Restrictions (Portadown) Order (Northern Ireland) 2013
15	The Rates (Temporary Rebate) (Amendment) Order (Northern Ireland) 2013
16	The Rates (Regional Rates) Order (Northern Ireland) 2013
17	The Rates (Exemption for Automatic Telling Machines in Rural Areas) Order (Northern Ireland) 2013
18	The County Courts (Financial Limits) Order (Northern Ireland) 2013
19	The County Court (Amendment) Rules (Northern Ireland) 2013
20	The Waiting Restrictions (Bangor) Order (Northern Ireland) 2013
21	The Waiting Restrictions (Londonderry) (Amendment) Order (Northern Ireland) 2013
22	Mental Health (Private Hospitals) Regulations (Northern Ireland) 2013
23	The Employment Rights (Increase of Limits) Order (Northern Ireland) 2013
24	The Gas (Applications for Licences and Extensions) (Amendment) Regulations (Northern Ireland) 2013
25	The Parental Leave (EU Directive) (Maternity and Parental Leave) Regulations (Northern Ireland) 2013
26	The Parental Leave (EU Directive) (Flexible Working) Regulations (Northern Ireland) 2013
27	The Limestone Road Area, Belfast (Abandonment) Order (Northern Ireland) 2013
28	The Urban Clearways (Amendment) Order (Northern Ireland) 2013
29	Disease Control (Standstill) Order (Northern Ireland) 2013
30	The Forestry Land Byelaws (Northern Ireland) 2013
31	The Forestry (2010 Act) (Commencement No. 2) Order (Northern Ireland) 2013
32	The Pension Protection Fund and Occupational Pension Schemes (Levy Ceiling and Compensation Cap) Order (Northern Ireland) 2013
33	The Waste (Amendment) (2007 Order) (Commencement No. 3) Order (Northern Ireland) 2013
34	The Waste and Contaminated Land (Amendment) (2011 Act) (Commencement No. 2) Order (Northern Ireland) 2013
35	Police Service of Northern Ireland and Police Service of Northern Ireland Reserve Pensions (Amendment) Regulations 2013
36	The Police Pension (Northern Ireland) (Amendment) Regulations 2013
37	The Student Fees (Qualifying Courses and Persons) (Amendment) Regulations (Northern Ireland) 2013
38	The Policing and Community Safety Partnerships (Designated Organisations) Order (Northern Ireland) 2013
39	The Food (Miscellaneous Amendment and Revocation) Regulations (Northern Ireland) 2013
40	The Health and Personal Social Services (Superannuation Scheme and Injury Benefits) and Health and Social Care (Pension Scheme) (Amendment) Regulations (Northern Ireland) 2013
41	The Curran Street and Obins Street, Portadown (Abandonment) Order (Northern Ireland) 2013
42	The Companies (Public Sector Audit) Order (Northern Ireland) 2013
43	The Welfare of Animals (Dog Breeding Establishments and Miscellaneous Amendments) Regulations (Northern Ireland) 2013
44	The Dogs (Guard Dog Kennels) Regulations (Northern Ireland) 2013
45	The New NAV List (Time of Valuation) Order (Northern Ireland) 2013
46	Rates (Small Business Hereditament Relief) (Amendment) Regulations (Northern Ireland) 2013
47	The Rates (Unoccupied Hereditaments) (Amendment) Regulations (Northern Ireland) 2013
48	The Identification and Traceability of Explosives Regulations (Northern Ireland) 2013
49	The Fair Employment (Specification of Public Authorities) (Amendment) Order (Northern Ireland) 2013
50	The Social Security (Claims and Payments) (Amendment) Regulations (Northern Ireland) 2013
51	The Road Races (Croft Hill Climb) Order (Northern Ireland) 2013
52	The Waiting Restrictions (Brockagh) Order (Northern Ireland) 2013
53	The Cycle Routes (Amendment) Order (Northern Ireland) 2013
54	The Teachers’ Superannuation (Amendment) Regulations (Northern Ireland) 2013
55	The Road Races (Circuit of Ireland Easter Stages Rally) Order (Northern Ireland) 2013
56	The Pneumoconiosis, etc., (Workers’ Compensation) (Payment of Claims) (Amendment) Regulations (Northern Ireland) 2013
57	The Mesothelioma Lump Sum Payments (Conditions and Amounts) (Amendment) Regulations (Northern Ireland) 2013
58	The Social Fund Maternity and Funeral Expenses (General) (Amendment) Regulations (Northern Ireland) 2013
59	The Health and Personal Social Services (General Medical Services Contracts) (Amendment) Regulations (Northern Ireland) 2013
60	Building (Prescribed Fees) (Amendment) Regulations (Northern Ireland) 2013
61	The Social Security Pensions (Flat Rate Accrual Amount) Order (Northern Ireland) 2013
62	The Social Security Revaluation of Earnings Factors Order (Northern Ireland) 2013
63	The Social Security Pensions (Low Earnings Threshold) Order (Northern Ireland) 2013
64	The Parking Places (Disabled Persons' Vehicles) (Amendment No. 2) Order (Northern Ireland) 2013
65	The Guaranteed Minimum Pensions Increase Order (Northern Ireland) 2013
66	The Food Safety (Sampling and Qualifications) Regulations (Northern Ireland) 2013
67	The Social Security (Miscellaneous Amendments) Regulations (Northern Ireland) 2013
68	The Education (Student Loans) (Repayment) (Amendment) Regulations (Northern Ireland) 2013
69	The Social Security Benefits Up-rating Order (Northern Ireland) 2013
70	The Social Security Benefits Up-rating Regulations (Northern Ireland) 2013
71	Local Government Pension Scheme (Amendment) Regulations (Northern Ireland) 2013
72	The Occupational and Stakeholder Pension Schemes (Miscellaneous Amendments) Regulations (Northern Ireland) 2013
73	The Health and Personal Social Services (Superannuation), Health and Social Care (Pension Scheme) (Amendment) Regulations (Northern Ireland) 2013
74	The Recovery of Health Services Charges (Amounts) (Amendment) Regulations (Northern Ireland) 2013
75	Policing (Miscellaneous Provisions) (Northern Ireland) Order 2007 (Commencement No. 1) Order 2013
76	The Zoonoses (Fees) (Amendment) Regulations (Northern Ireland) 2013
77	The Misuse of Drugs (Designation) (Amendment) Order (Northern Ireland) 2013
78	The Misuse of Drugs (Amendment) Regulations (Northern Ireland) 2013
79	The Automatic Enrolment (Earnings Trigger and Qualifying Earnings Band) Order (Northern Ireland) 2013
80	The Rates (Unoccupied Hereditaments) (Amendment No. 2) Regulations (Northern Ireland) 2013
81	The Costs Protection (Aarhus Convention) Regulations (Northern Ireland) 2013
82	The Crown Court (Amendment) Rules (Northern Ireland) 2013
83	The Pensions (2012 Act) (Commencement No. 3) Order (Northern Ireland) 2013
84	The New Firefighters’ Pension Scheme (Amendment) Order (Northern Ireland) 2013
85	The Firefighters’ Pension Scheme (Amendment) Order (Northern Ireland) 2013
86	Registered Rents (Increase) Order (Northern Ireland) 2013
87	The Road Races (Cookstown 100) Order (Northern Ireland) 2013
88	The Road Races (Tandragee 100) Order (Northern Ireland) 2013
89	The Magistrates’ Courts (Amendment) Rules (Northern Ireland) 2013
90	Superannuation (Maze/Long Kesh Development Corporation) Order (Northern Ireland) 2013
91	Pensions Increase (Review) Order (Northern Ireland) 2013
92	The Gas and Electricity (Internal Markets) Regulations (Northern Ireland) 2013
93	Electricity (Class Exemptions from the Requirement for a Licence) Order (Northern Ireland) 2013
94	The Electricity (Dispute Resolution) Regulations (Northern Ireland) 2013
95	The Pension Protection Fund and Occupational and Personal Pension Schemes (Miscellaneous Amendments) Regulations (Northern Ireland) 2013
96	The Planning (General Development) (Amendment) Order (Northern Ireland) 2013
97	The Parking Places on Roads (Lurgan) Order (Northern Ireland) 2013
98	The Parking Places (Disabled Persons' Vehicles) (Amendment No. 3) Order (Northern Ireland) 2013
99	The Traffic Weight Restriction (Amendment) Order (Northern Ireland) 2013
100	The Waiting Restrictions (Londonderry) (Amendment No. 2) Order (Northern Ireland) 2013

== 101-200 ==
Number	Title
101	The Road Races (Drumhorc Hill Climb) Order (Northern Ireland) 2013
102	The Attorney General’s Human Rights Guidance (Protection of Life) Order (Northern Ireland) 2013
103	The Plant Health (Amendment No.2) Order (Northern Ireland) 2013
104	The Transport (2011Act) (Commencement No. 1) Order (Northern Ireland) 2013
105	The Road Races (North West 200) Order (Northern Ireland) 2013
106	The Road Races (Spamount Hill Climb) Order (Northern Ireland) 2013
107	Agriculture (Student fees) (Amendment) Regulations (Northern Ireland) 2013
108	The Health and Safety (Sharp Instruments in Healthcare) Regulations (Northern Ireland) 2013
109	The Whole of Government Accounts (Designation of Bodies) Order (Northern Ireland) 2013
110	The Road Races (Tour of the Sperrins Rally) Order (Northern Ireland) 2013
111	The Waiting Restrictions (Enniskillen) Order (Northern Ireland) 2013
112	The Parking and Waiting Restrictions (Armagh) (Amendment) Order (Northern Ireland) 2013
113	The Road Races (Mourne Rally) Order (Northern Ireland) 2013
114	Appointment of Consultants (Amendment) Regulations (Northern Ireland) 2013
115	The Goods Vehicles (Community Licence) Regulations (Northern Ireland) 2013
116	The Renewables Obligation (Amendment) Order (Northern Ireland) 2013
117	The Northern Ireland Poultry Health Assurance Scheme (Fees) (Amendment) Order (Northern Ireland) 2013
118	The Scrapie (Fees) (Amendment) Regulations (Northern Ireland) 2013
119	Prohibition of the Sale of Rod Caught Salmon Regulations (Northern Ireland) 2013
120	The Student Fees (Amounts) (Amendment) Regulations (Northern Ireland) 2013
121	The Parking and Waiting Restrictions (Ballymena) (Amendment) Order (Northern Ireland) 2013
122	The Animals and Animal Products (Examination for Residues and Maximum Residue Limits) (Amendment) Regulations (Northern Ireland) 2013
123	The Loading Bays on Roads (Amendment) Order (Northern Ireland) 2013
124	The Waiting Restrictions (Cookstown) (Amendment) Order (Northern Ireland) 2013
125	The Justice (2011 Act) (Commencement No. 6) Order (Northern Ireland) 2013
126	The Criminal Evidence (Northern Ireland) Order 1999 (Commencement No. 8) Order 2013
127	The Disposal of Vehicles (Prescribed Period) Regulations (Northern Ireland) 2013
128	The Education (Student Support) (No. 2) Regulations (Northern Ireland) 2009 (Amendment) Regulations (Northern Ireland) 2013
129	The Cycle Routes (Amendment No. 2) Order (Northern Ireland) 2013
130	The Roads (Speed Limit) Order (Northern Ireland) 2013
131	County Court Divisions (Amendment) Order (Northern Ireland) 2013
132	County Court Divisions Order (Northern Ireland) 2013
133	The Parking and Waiting Restrictions (Strabane) (Amendment) Order (Northern Ireland) 2013
134	The Road Races (Cairncastle Hill Climb) Order (Northern Ireland) 2013
135	The Cycle Routes (Amendment No. 3) Order (Northern Ireland) 2013
136	The Parking Places on Roads (Londonderry) (Amendment) Order (Northern Ireland) 2013
137	The Forestry (Felling of Trees) (Calculation of the Area of Land) Regulations (Northern Ireland) 2013
138	The Forestry (2010 Act) (Commencement No. 3) Order (Northern Ireland) 2013
139	The Forestry (Felling of Trees) Regulations (Northern Ireland) 2013
140	The County Court (Amendment No.2) Rules (Northern Ireland) 2013
141	The Health and Personal Social Services (Superannuation) (Injury Benefits) (Amendment) Regulations (Northern Ireland) 2013
142	The Statistics and Registration Service Act 2007 (Disclosure of Pupil Information) Regulations (Northern Ireland) 2013
143	The Statistics and Registration Service Act 2007 (Disclosure of Higher Education Student Information) Regulations (Northern Ireland) 2013
144	The Agriculture (Hardship Payment) Scheme (Northern Ireland) 2013
145	The Charities (2008 Act) (Commencement No. 4) Order (Northern Ireland) 2013
146	The Charities Act 2008 (Consequential Provision and Savings) Order (Northern Ireland) 2013
147	The Council of the Pharmaceutical Society of Northern Ireland (Continuing Professional Development) (Amendment) Regulations (Northern Ireland) 2013
148	The Parking and Waiting Restrictions (Belfast) (Amendment) Order (Northern Ireland) 2013
149	The Attorney General’s Human Rights Guidance (State Pathologist’s Department) Order (Northern Ireland) 2013
150	The Attorney General’s Human Rights Guidance (Forensic Science Northern Ireland) Order (Northern Ireland) 2013
151	The Quality of Bathing Water (Amendment) Regulations (Northern Ireland) 2013
152	The Off-Street Parking (Amendment) Order (Northern Ireland) 2013
153	The Nugent's Entry, Enniskillen (Abandonment) Order (Northern Ireland) 2013
154	The Roads (Speed Limit) (No. 2) Order (Northern Ireland) 2013
155	The Parking and Waiting Restrictions (Banbridge) Order (Northern Ireland) 2013
156	The Brucevale Park, Belfast (Stopping-Up) Order (Northern Ireland) 2013
157	The Knocksallagh Green, Greenisland (Abandonment) Order (Northern Ireland) 2013
158	The Glenvarna Walk, Newtownabbey (Footpath) (Abandonment) Order (Northern Ireland) 2013
159	The Parking and Waiting Restrictions (Belfast) (Amendment No. 2) Order (Northern Ireland) 2013
160	The Pollution Prevention and Control (Industrial Emissions) Regulations (Northern Ireland) 2013
161	The Landfill (Amendment) Regulations (Northern Ireland) 2013
162	The Criminal Justice (2013 Act) (Commencement No.1) Order (Northern Ireland) 2013
163	The Parking Places (Disabled Persons' Vehicles) (Amendment No. 4) Order (Northern Ireland) 2013
164	Emergency Grants (Eligible Tenants) (Amendment) Order (Northern Ireland) 2013
165	Compulsory Acquisition (Interest) (Amendment) Order (Northern Ireland) 2013
166	The Industrial Training Levy (Construction Industry) Order (Northern Ireland) 2013
167	The Social Security (Croatia) (Amendment) Regulations (Northern Ireland) 2013
168	The Road Races (Craigantlet Hill Climb) Order (Northern Ireland) 2013
169	The Road Races (Armoy Motorcycle Race) Order (Northern Ireland) 2013
170	The Motor Vehicles (Driving Licences) (Amendment) Regulations (Northern Ireland) 2013
171	The Inquiry into Historical Institutional Abuse Rules (Northern Ireland) 2013
172	The New Firefighters’ Pension Scheme (Amendment) (No. 2) Order (Northern Ireland) 2013
173	The Gas and Electricity (Internal Markets) (Amendment) Regulations (Northern Ireland) 2013
174	The Renewables Obligation (Amendment No. 2) Order (Northern Ireland) 2013
175	The Rules of the Court of Judicature (Northern Ireland) (Amendment) 2013
176	The Road Races (Mid-Antrim 150) Order (Northern Ireland) 2013
177	The Control of Traffic (Belfast City Centre) Order (Northern Ireland) 2013
178	The Healthy Start Scheme and Day Care Food Scheme (Amendment) Regulations (Northern Ireland) 2013
179	The Local Government (Statutory Transition Committees) Regulations (Northern Ireland) 2013
180	The Specified Products from China (Restriction on First Placing on the Market) (Amendment) Regulations (Northern Ireland) 2013
181	The Sex Discrimination Code of Practice (Equal Pay) (Appointed Day) Order (Northern Ireland) 2013
182	The Child Support (Miscellaneous Amendments) Regulations (Northern Ireland) 2013
183	Local Government (Severance Payments to Councillors) Regulations (Northern Ireland) 2013
184	The Road Races (Garron Point Hill Climb) Order (Northern Ireland) 2013
185	The Road Races (Ulster Grand Prix Bike Week) Order (Northern Ireland) 2013
186	The Waiting Restrictions (Larne) (Amendment) Order (Northern Ireland) 2013
187	The Loading Bays on Roads (Amendment No. 2) Order (Northern Ireland) 2013
188	The Frome Street, Belfast (Footpaths) (Abandonment) Order (Northern Ireland) 2013
189	Allocation of Housing and Homelessness (Eligibility) (Amendment) Regulations (Northern Ireland) 2013
190	The Child Support and Claims and Payments (Miscellaneous Amendments and Change to the Minimum Amount of Liability) Regulations (Northern Ireland) 2013
191	The Social Fund Winter Fuel Payment (Amendment) Regulations (Northern Ireland) 2013
192	The Criminal Justice (2013 Act) (Commencement No.2) Order (Northern Ireland) 2013
193	The Road Races (Ulster Rally) Order (Northern Ireland) 2013
194	The Waiting Restrictions (Carrickfergus) Order (Northern Ireland) 2013
195	The Waiting Restrictions (Warrenpoint) Order (Northern Ireland) 2013
196	The Road Traffic (Fixed Penalty) (Offences) (Amendment No.2) Order (Northern Ireland) 2013
197	The Road Traffic (Fixed Penalty) (Amendment No.2) Order (Northern Ireland) 2013
198	The Smoke Control Areas (Exempted Fireplaces) Regulations (Northern Ireland) 2013
199	The Employer’s Liability (Compulsory Insurance) (Amendment) Regulations (Northern Ireland) 2013
200	The Waiting Restrictions (Bangor) (Amendment) Order (Northern Ireland) 2013

== 201-308 ==
Number	Title
201	The Child Maintenance (2008 Act) (Commencement No. 11 and Transitional Provisions) Order (Northern Ireland) 2013
202	The Rules of the Court of Judicature (Northern Ireland) (Amendment No. 2) 2013
203	The Magistrates’ Courts (Domestic Proceedings) (Amendment) Rules (Northern Ireland) 2013
204	Optical Charges and Payments (Amendment) Regulations (Northern Ireland) 2013
205	The Smoke Control Areas (Authorised Fuels) Regulations (Northern Ireland) 2013
206	The Biocidal Products and Chemicals (Appointment of Authorities and Enforcement) Regulations (Northern Ireland) 2013
207	The Biocidal Products (Fees and Charges) Regulations (Northern Ireland) 2013
208	The Electricity and Gas (Market Integrity and Transparency) (Enforcement etc.) Regulations (Northern Ireland) 2013
209	The Housing Benefit (Executive Determinations) (Amendment) Regulations (Northern Ireland) 2013
210	The Planning (General Development) (Amendment No.2) Order (Northern Ireland) 2013
211	The Charities Act 2008 (Transitional Provision) Order (Northern Ireland) 2013
212	The Fishing Boats (Satellite-Tracking Devices) Scheme (Northern Ireland) 2013
213	The Pension Protection Fund and Occupational Pension Schemes (Miscellaneous Amendments) Regulations (Northern Ireland) 2013
214	The Access to Justice (Membership of the Northern Ireland Legal Services Commission) Order (Northern Ireland) 2013
215	The Sea Fish Industry (Harbour and Landing Dues) Scheme (Northern Ireland) 2013
216	The Disability Discrimination (2006 Order) (Commencement No.5) Order (Northern Ireland) 2013
217	The Motor Vehicle Testing (Amendment) Regulations (Northern Ireland) 2013
218	The Goods Vehicles (Testing) (Amendment) Regulations (Northern Ireland) 2013
219	The Fish Labelling Regulations (Northern Ireland) 2013
220	The Food Additives, Flavourings, Enzymes and Extraction Solvents Regulations (Northern Ireland) 2013
221	The Occupational and Personal Pension Schemes (Automatic Enrolment) (Amendment) Regulations (Northern Ireland) 2013
222	The Pensions (2005 Order) (Codes of Practice) (Reporting Late Payment of Contributions) (Appointed Day) Order (Northern Ireland) 2013
223	The Education (Student Support) (No. 2) Regulations (Northern Ireland) 2009 (Amendment) (No. 2) Regulations (Northern Ireland) 2013
224	The Goods Vehicles (Community Licence) (Amendment) Regulations (Northern Ireland) 2013
225	The Northern Ireland Social Care Council (Social Care Workers Prohibition) and Fitness of Workers Regulations (Northern Ireland) 2013
226	The Waiting Restrictions (Holywood) (Amendment No. 2) Order (Northern Ireland) 2013
227	The Cycle Routes (Amendment No. 4) Order (Northern Ireland) 2013
228	The One-Way Traffic (Carrickfergus) (Amendment) Order (Northern Ireland) 2013
229	The Contaminants in Food Regulations (Northern Ireland) 2013
230	The Waiting Restrictions (Dungannon) Order (Northern Ireland) 2013
231	The Parking Places (Disabled Persons’ Vehicles) (Amendment No. 5) Order (Northern Ireland) 2013
232	The Lisburn Road, Ballynahinch (Abandonment) Order (Northern Ireland) 2013
233	The Frederick Street, Belfast (Footpath) (Abandonment) Order (Northern Ireland) 2013
234	The C338 (unnamed road), Moneymore, Newry (Abandonment) Order (Northern Ireland) 2013
235	The Waiting Restrictions (Belmont Road, Belfast) Order (Northern Ireland) 2013
236	The Train Driving Licences and Certificates (Amendment) Regulations (Northern Ireland) 2013
237	The Railways (Safety Management) (Amendment) Regulations (Northern Ireland) 2013
238 (C. 15)	The Local Government (Boundaries) (2008 Act) (Commencement, Transitional Provision and Savings) Order (Northern Ireland) 2013
239	The Lands Tribunal (Salaries) Order (Northern Ireland) 2013 (revoked)
240	The Shore Road, Belfast (Abandonment) Order (Northern Ireland) 2013
241	The Waste (Amendment) Regulations (Northern Ireland) 2013
242	The Parking and Waiting Restrictions (Magherafelt) Order (Northern Ireland) 2013
243	The Automatic Enrolment (Miscellaneous Amendments) Regulations (Northern Ireland) 2013
244	The African Horse Sickness Regulations (Northern Ireland) 2013
245	The Parking Places (Disabled Persons’ Vehicles) (Amendment No. 6) Order (Northern Ireland) 2013
246	The Social Security (Miscellaneous Amendments No. 2) Regulations (Northern Ireland) 2013
247	The Health and Personal Social Services (Superannuation), Health and Social Care (Pension Scheme) (Amendment No.2) Regulations (Northern Ireland) 2013
248	The Waste (Fees and Charges) (Amendment) Regulations (Northern Ireland) 2013
249	The Criminal Justice Act 1988 (Reviews of Sentencing) Order (Northern Ireland) 2013
250	The Jobseeker’s Allowance (Domestic Violence) (Amendment) Regulations (Northern Ireland) 2013
251 (C. 16)	The Criminal Evidence (Northern Ireland) Order 1999 (Commencement No. 9) Order 2013
252 (C. 17)	The Justice (2011 Act) (Commencement No. 7) Order (Northern Ireland) 2013
253	The Fruit Juices and Fruit Nectars Regulations (Northern Ireland) 2013
254	The Parking and Waiting Restrictions (Belfast) (Amendment No. 3) Order (Northern Ireland) 2013
255	The Controlled Waste and Duty of Care Regulations (Northern Ireland) 2013
256	The M2/Trunk Road T7 Order (Northern Ireland) 2013
257	The Traffic Signs (Amendment) Regulations (Northern Ireland) 2013
258	The Pharmacy (1976 Order) (Amendment) Order (Northern Ireland) 2013
259	The Health and Personal Social Services (Superannuation Scheme and Additional Voluntary Contributions), Health and Social Care (Pension Scheme) (Amendment) Regulations (Northern Ireland) 2013
260	The Controlled Waste (Seizure of Property) Regulations (Northern Ireland) 2013
261	The Weights and Measures (Specified Quantities) (Unwrapped Bread and Intoxicating Liquor) Order (Northern Ireland) 2013
262	The Producer Responsibility Obligations (Packaging Waste) (Amendment) Regulations (Northern Ireland) 2013
263	The Pensions (2005 Order) (Code of Practice) (Governance and Administration of Occupational Defined Contribution Trust-based Pension Schemes) (Appointed Day) Order (Northern Ireland) 2013
264	The Off-Street Parking (Amendment No. 2) Order (Northern Ireland) 2013
265	The Galwally Avenue, Belfast (Abandonment) Order (Northern Ireland) 2013
266	The Route U6005 Quoile Brae, Downpatrick (Abandonment) Order (Northern Ireland) 2013
267	The Loading Bays on Roads (Amendment No. 3) Order (Northern Ireland) 2013
268	The Waiting Restrictions (Bangor) (Amendment No. 2) Order (Northern Ireland) 2013
269	The Waiting Restrictions (Crumlin) (Amendment) Order (Northern Ireland) 2013
270	The Waiting Restrictions (Bushmills) (Amendment) Order (Northern Ireland) 2013
271	The Waiting Restrictions (Ballycastle) Order (Northern Ireland) 2013
272	Legal Aid (Assessment of Resources) (Amendment) Regulations (Northern Ireland) 2013
273	The Parking and Waiting Restrictions (Omagh) Order (Northern Ireland) 2013
274	The Roads (Speed Limit) (No. 3) Order (Northern Ireland) 2013
275	The Parking and Waiting Restrictions (Banbridge) (Amendment) Order (Northern Ireland) 2013
276 (C. 18)	The Child Maintenance (2008 Act) (Commencement No. 12 and Savings Provisions) Order (Northern Ireland) 2013
277	The Social Security (Age-Related Payments) Regulations (Northern Ireland) 2013
278	The Insolvency (Amendment) Rules (Northern Ireland) 2013
279	The Trunk Road T7 (A26 Dualling—Glarryford to A44 Drones Road Junction) Order (Northern Ireland) 2013
280	The Private Accesses (A26 Dualling—Glarryford to A44 Drones Road Junction) (Stopping-Up) Order (Northern Ireland) 2013
281	The Gas (Applications for Licences and Extensions) (Amendment No. 2) Regulations (Northern Ireland) 2013
282	The Housing Benefit (Local Housing Allowance and Executive Determinations) (Amendment) Regulations (Northern Ireland) 2013
283	The Occupational Pensions (Revaluation) Order (Northern Ireland) 2013
284	The Licensing (George Best Belfast City Airport) Order (Northern Ireland) 2013
285	The Goods Vehicles (Testing) (Amendment No. 2) Regulations (Northern Ireland) 2013
286	The Motor Vehicle Testing (Amendment No. 2) Regulations (Northern Ireland) 2013
287	The Road Service Licensing (Community Licences) Regulations (Northern Ireland) 2013 (revoked)
288	The Control of Traffic (Antrim) (Amendment) Order (Northern Ireland) 2013
289	The One-Way Traffic (Belfast) (Amendment) Order (Northern Ireland) 2013
290	The C334 Derryleckagh Road and B7 Bridge Road, Warrenpoint (Abandonment) Order (Northern Ireland) 2013
291	The Food Safety, Food Hygiene and Official Controls (Sprouting Seeds and Miscellaneous Amendments) Regulations (Northern Ireland) 2013
292	The Smoke Control Areas (Exempted Fireplaces) (No. 2) Regulations (Northern Ireland) 2013
293	The Legal Aid for Crown Court Proceedings (Costs) (Amendment) Rules (Northern Ireland) 2013
294	The Feed (Hygiene and Enforcement) and the Animal Feed (Amendment) Regulations (Northern Ireland) 2013 (revoked)
295	The Less Favoured Area Compensatory Allowances Regulations (Northern Ireland) 2013
296	The Contaminants in Food (Amendment) Regulations (Northern Ireland) 2013
297	The Parking and Waiting Restrictions (Belfast) (Amendment No. 4) Order (Northern Ireland) 2013
298	The Motor Vehicles (Driving Licences) (Amendment No. 2) Regulations (Northern Ireland) 2013
299	The Health Services (Cross-Border Health Care) Regulations (Northern Ireland) 2013 (revoked)
300	General Dental Services (Amendment) Regulations (Northern Ireland) 2013
301	The Health and Personal Social Services (General Medical Services Contracts) (Amendment No. 2) Regulations (Northern Ireland) 2013
302	Provision of Health Services to Persons not Ordinarily Resident (Amendment) Regulations (Northern Ireland) 2013 (revoked)
303	The Housing Benefit (Executive Determinations and Local Housing Allowance) (Amendment) Regulations (Northern Ireland) 2013
304	The Seeds (Miscellaneous Amendments) Regulations (Northern Ireland) 2013 (revoked)
305	The Waiting Restrictions (Bangor) (Amendment No. 3) Order (Northern Ireland) 2013
306	The Roads (Speed Limit) (No. 4) Order (Northern Ireland) 2013
307	The Parking Places (Disabled Persons' Vehicles) (Amendment No. 7) Order (Northern Ireland) 2013
308	The Jobseeker’s Allowance (Habitual Residence) (Amendment) Regulations (Northern Ireland) 2013

== See also ==
- List of acts of the Northern Ireland Assembly from 2013
- List of acts of the Parliament of the United Kingdom from 2013
