= Northern Ireland Historical Institutional Abuse Inquiry =

Legal inquiry

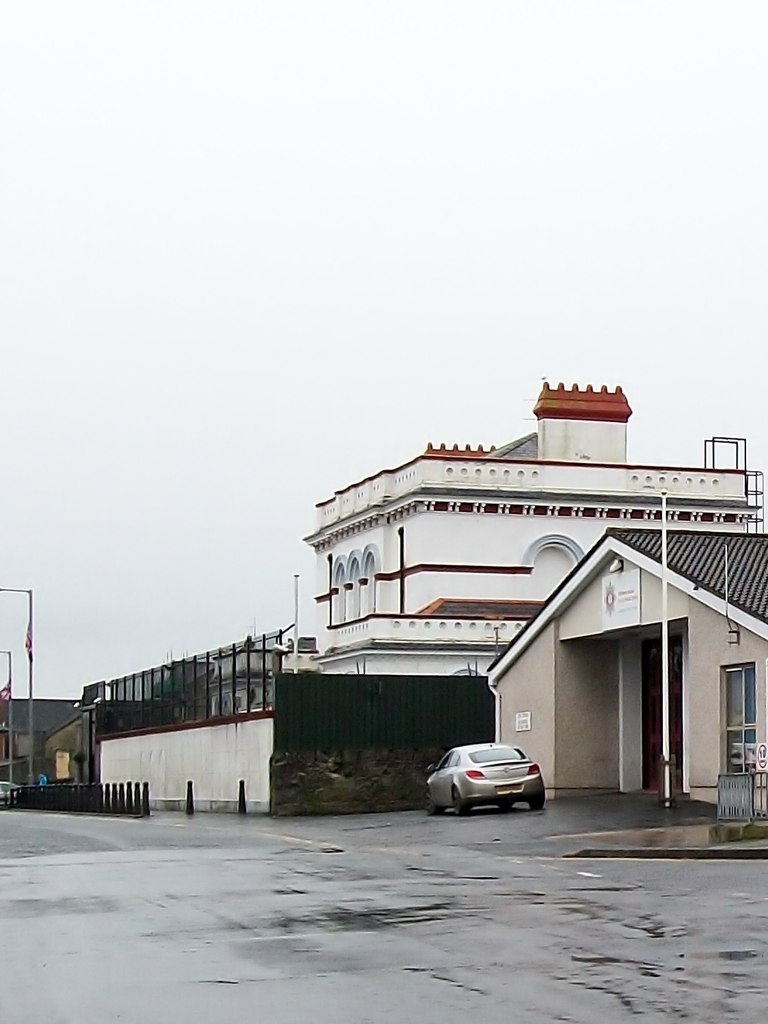
The Inquiry sat at the former court house at Banbridge

The 2014–2016 Northern Ireland Historical Institutional Abuse Inquiry, often referred to as the HIA Inquiry, is the largest inquiry into historical institutional sexual and physical abuse of children in Northern Ireland legal history. Its remit covers institutions in Northern Ireland that provided residential care for children from 1922 to 1995, but excludes most church-run schools.

On 11 March 2022 ministers from the five main political parties in Northern Ireland and six abusing institutions made statements of apology in the Northern Ireland Assembly. A typical apology was "Today we, as representatives of the state, say that we are sorry ... that the state's systems failed to protect you from abuse".

== History ==
Inquiry into Historical Institutional Abuse Act (Northern Ireland) 2013
- Act of the Northern Ireland Assembly
- Northern Ireland Assembly
- Long title: An Act to make provision relating to an inquiry into institutional abuse between 1922 and 1995.
- Citation: 2013 c. 2 (N.I.)

Dates
- Royal assent: 18 January 2013
Other legislation
Amended by	Public Services Ombudsman Act (Northern Ireland) 2016

Status: Amended

Text of statute as originally enacted

Text of the Inquiry into Historical Institutional Abuse Act (Northern Ireland) 2013 as in force today (including any amendments) within the United Kingdom, from legislation.gov.uk.

The inquiry was set up in response to the Inquiry into Historical Institutional Abuse Act (Northern Ireland) 2013 (c. 2 (N.I.)). Following a request to extend its timescale, the inquiry's report was delivered to the First Minister and deputy First Minister (who had no powers to change it) on 6 January 2017, shortly before the deadline of 18 January, and published on 20 January. The cost was estimated at £17–19 million, with 30 people working on the inquiry according to its Frequently Asked Questions as of January 2017. There are provisions for witness support.

The inquiry had statutory powers to compel witnesses living in Northern Ireland to appear before it and evidence held in Northern Ireland to be given to it; to take evidence under oath; and to be held in public except where necessary to protect individuals' privacy. Inquiry Rule 14(3) does not allow any explicit or significant criticism of a person unless the chairperson has sent them a warning letter, with a reasonable opportunity to respond.

Victims and survivors were represented by the inquiry's legal team at hearings; other witness were allowed their own legal representatives. Only the Inquiry legal team questioned witnesses, and victims and survivors were not normally cross examined by anyone else except in extremely unusual cases.

The inquiry concluded its hearings on 8 July 2016 and released its report on 20 January 2017.

In October 2019 the House of Lords passed the Historical Institutional Abuse (Northern Ireland) Bill "to establish the Historical Institutional Abuse Redress Board and confer an entitlement to compensation...", and it was passed by the House of Commons as one of its last acts before the 2019 United Kingdom general election.

In the 2019 New Year's Honours list, the Secretary of the Inquiry, Andrew Browne, was made OBE for his services to victims and survivors of abuse, while Paula Dawson was made MBE for her services to public inquiries.

In May 2020 Interim Advocate for Survivors of Historical Abuse Brendan McAllister office leaked the personal and private details of approximately 250 Survivors of Historical abuse in an emailing data breach error and as a result McAllister faced widespread calls to resign from the two oldest and largest Survivor groups the Saint Patrick's Survivors and SAVIA alongside many other independent survivors having lost trust in the Interim Advocate.

In June 2020 Interim advocate Brendan McAllister was called to resign again after victims accused him of having a "conflict of interest", after he was ordained as a Deacon in the Catholic Church. McAllister assisted in liturgy at Saint Peter's Church in Warrenpoint as part of the Down and Connor Diocese, despite the HIA Inquiry having found that the Diocese of Down and Conner failed to raise concerns about serial child abuser Father Brendan Smyth, and did not inform social services or the police.

== Scope of inquiry ==
The inquiry said that it would investigate the following Institutions, but that it might later decide to investigate others:

- Local Authority Homes
  - Lissue Children's Unit, Lisburn
  - Kincora Boys' Home, Belfast
  - Bawnmore Children’s Home, Newtownabbey
- Juvenile Justice Institutions (formerly Industrial and Reformatory Schools, effectively children's detention centres)
  - St Patrick’s Training School, Belfast
  - Lisnevin Training School, County Down
  - Rathgael Training School, Bangor
- Secular Voluntary Homes
  - Barnardo's Sharonmore Project, Newtownabbey
  - Barnardo's Macedon, Newtownabbey
- Roman Catholic Voluntary Homes
  - St Joseph’s Home, Termonbacca, Derry
  - Nazareth House Children's Home, Derry
  - Nazareth House Children's Home, Belfast
  - Nazareth Lodge Children's Home, Belfast
  - De La Salle Boys' Home, Rubane House, Kircubbin, County Down

The inquiry covers residential care, but specifically does not cover other cases of clerical abuse, or most church-run schools

The Inquiry's hearings are held in the former Banbridge courthouse; the opening hearing was held on 13 January 2014, with open oral testimony to finish in June 2015, and with the inquiry team reporting to the Executive by the start of 2016. Hearings are divided into modules:

- Module 1 into the Sisters of Nazareth Homes in Derry (27 January 2014 to 29 May 2014)
- Module 2 Child Migrant Programme, which forcibly sent children from NI institutions to Australia where they were often maltreated and exploited
- Module 3 De La Salle Boys Home - Rubane House, from 29 September 2014, with closing submissions on 17 December 2014.
- Module 4, on Sisters of Nazareth Belfast - Nazareth House and Lodge, started on 5 January 2015.
- Module 5 covers Fort James Children's Home of Ardmore Road and Harberton House Assessment Centre of Irish Street, both in Derry.
- Module 6 relates to Fr. Brendan Smyth, who abused children in parishes in Belfast, and also in Dublin and the United States.
- Module 7 - Juvenile Justice Institutions
- Module 8 - Barnardo's
- Module 9 - Manor House Home, Lisburn
- Module 10 - Millisle Borstal
- Module 11 - St Joseph's Training School, Middletown
- Module 12 - Congregation of Our Lady of Charity of the Good Shepherd (the "Good Shepherd Sisters"), which ran institutions which provided residential accommodation for children in Belfast, Derry and Newry
- Module 13 - Lissue Hospital
- Module 14 - Governance and Finance
- Module 15 - Kincora and Bawnmore

Evidence called and transcripts are available on the HIA Web site.

The Inquiry examined allegations relating to the former Kincora Boys' Home from 31 May to 9 July 2016, including claims that there was a paedophile ring at the home with links to the intelligence services; Northern Ireland Secretary Theresa Villiers said that all state agencies would co-operate with the inquiry.

== Findings ==
On 20 January 2017 the Inquiry chairman Sir Anthony Hart, a retired Judge, announced the release of the Report which found wide-spread abuse of children in care. The report "..outlined a series of recommendations after he revealed shocking levels of sexual, physical and emotional abuse in the period 1922 to 1995." including that the victims should receive state-backed compensation payments between £7,500 and £100,000.

He said that all documents considered relevant and without private information would be placed on the website, starting before the report was released, but warning that it would take some time before the task was completed. He recommended financial compensation, an apology and a permanent memorial to be erected at Stormont.

A board was set to represent all six institutions with a view to paying compensation to abuse victims; however, by April 2024, four of the six institutions had taken no action towards making payments.

== Apology ==
On 11 March 2022, five years after the recommendation for an apology was made, ministers from the five main political parties in Northern Ireland made statements of apology to those abused, and those sent as child migrants to Australia, in the Northern Ireland Assembly. A typical apology was "Today we, as representatives of the state, say that we are sorry ... that the state's systems failed to protect you from abuse". Representatives from six institutions that carried out abuse also apologised. De La Salle Brothers were represented by Br Francis Manning the Sisters of Nazareth by Sr Cornelia Walsh, Sisters of St. Louis by Sr Uainin Clarke, Good Shepherd Sisters by Sr Cait O'Leary, Barnardo's in Northern Ireland by Michele Janes, and Irish Church Missions by Rev Mark Jones.

About 80 survivors were in the assembly chamber, and others were given rooms in Parliament Buildings to watch the apology. Some survivors left the chamber during the speeches. Some of the campaigners, for example Margaret McGuckin, from Survivors and Victims of Institutional Abuse (Savia), approved of the apology; others considered that the politicians apologies were appropriate, but the institutions had offered a cold, half-hearted apology.

In live reporting after the apology, BBC News reported that Jon McCourt from Survivors North West said "If what happened today was the best that the church could offer by way of an apology they failed miserably. There was no emotion, there was no ownership. ... I don't believe that the church and institutions atoned today." He called on the intuitions to "do the right thing" and contribute to the redress fund for survivors, saying that institutions have done similar for people in Scotland. McCourt praised the government ministers' apologies; they had "sat and thought out and listened to what it was we said.", but said that the institutions had failed to do this, leading to some victims having to leave the room while they were speaking, "compound[ing] the hurt." Others angry at the institutions' apologies included Caroline Farry, who attended St Joseph's Training School in Middletown from 1978-1981, overseen by nuns from the Sisters of St Louis, Pádraigín Drinan from Survivors of Abuse, and Alice Harper, whose brother, a victim of the De La Salle Brothers, had since died. Peter Murdock, from campaign group Savia, was at Nazareth Lodge Orphanage with his brother (who had recently died); he likened the institution to an "SS camp". He said "It's shocking to hear a nun from the institution apologising ... it comes 30 years too late ... people need to realise that it has to come from the heart. They say it came from the heart but why did they not apologise 30 years ago?"

== See also ==
- Catholic Church sexual abuse cases#Northern Ireland
- Independent Inquiry into Child Sexual Abuse (England and Wales, opened in July 2015)
- Institutional abuse
