= Villa Loretto =

- U.S. National Register of Historic Places
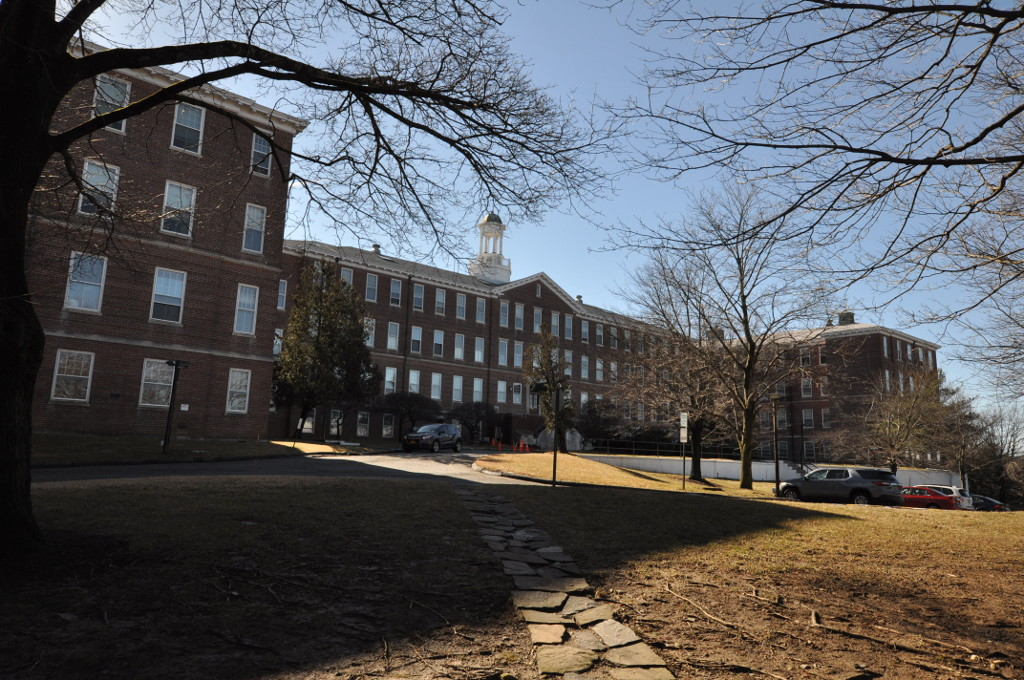

- Location within New York Location within the United States
- Location: Crompond Rd., Peekskill, New York
- Coordinates: 41°17′25″N 73°54′13″W
- Area: 18 acres (7.3 ha)
- Built: 1928
- Architect: Murphy, Frank J.
- NRHP reference No.: 88000148
- Added to NRHP: April 27, 1989

Villa Loretto is a historic institutional building located at Peekskill, Westchester County, New York. It was built in 1928 by the Sisters of the Good Shepherd for the housing and treatment of young delinquent women. It is a three- to four-story, H-shaped brick building containing more than 175,000 square feet. The facility closed in June 1975. It has been converted to condominium residences known as Villa at the Woods.

The property was added to the National Register of Historic Places in 1989.
