= Mary of St. Jerome Tourneux =

French Roman Catholic nun

Mary of St. Jerome Tourneux was a French Roman Catholic nun who established the first monastery of the Order of Our Lady of Charity in the United States.

== Biography ==
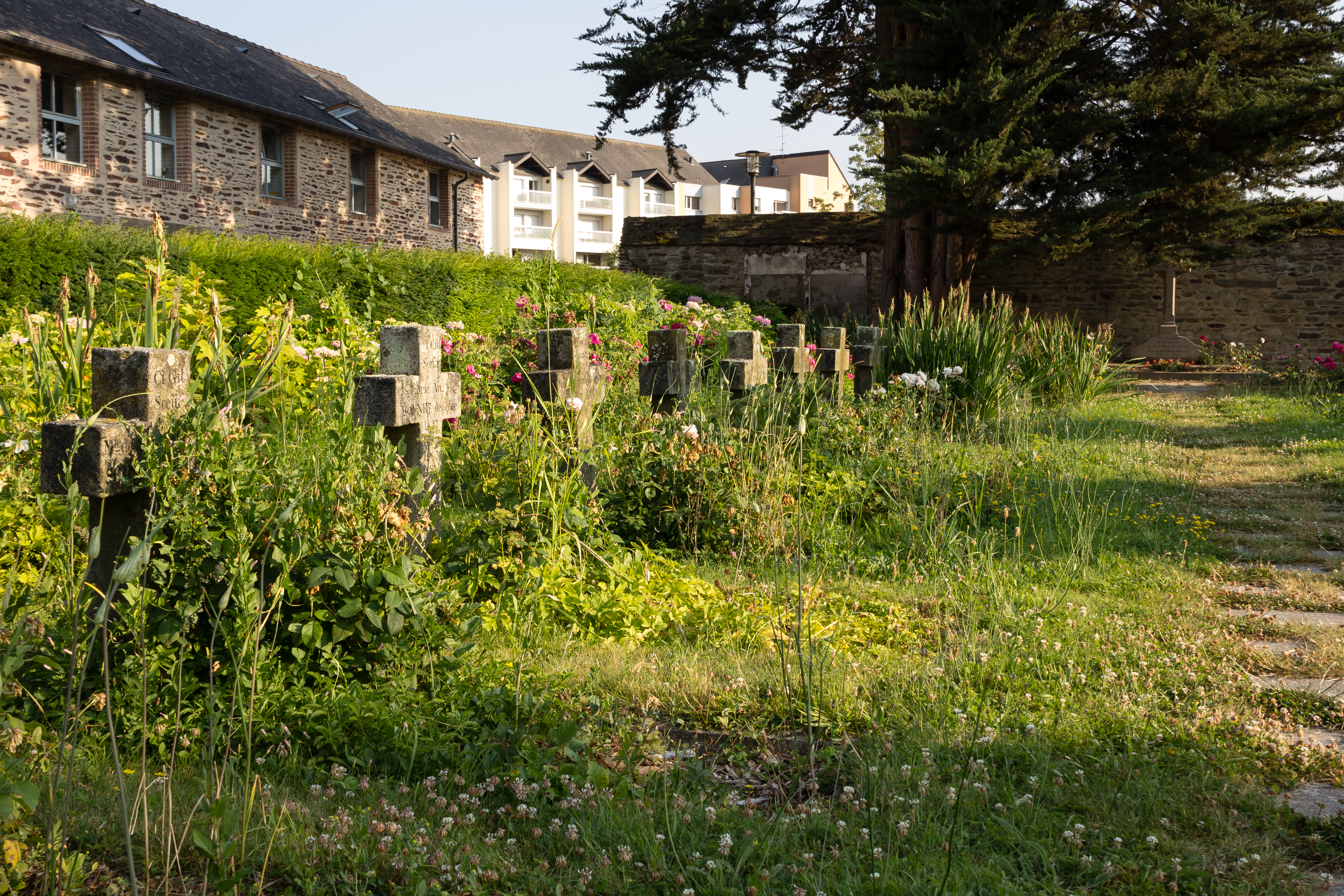
The monastery of Our Lady of Charity in Rennes and its cemetery

Julie Josephine Adelaide Tourneux de la Galaiserie was born on 16 November 1808 in Piré-sur-Seiche, France. She was the seventh of eleven children born to Marie Rosalie Rubillon Du Lattay and Jean Baptiste Tourneux, three of whom died in childhood. Her oldest sister, Mary Rose, joined the Sisters of Providence.

Despite opposition from her parents, Tourneux joined the Order of Our Lady of Charity in Rennes in June 1829, where she took the religious name Mary of St. Jerome. She took the habit on 25 September 1829, and made her vows on 13 October 1831. In 1845, she was sent to become superior of the monastery of her order in Blois, where her two predecessors had resigned due to community conflicts. She served there for two three-year terms before being recalled to Rennes.

In 1855, John Timon, the bishop of Buffalo, asked Rennes to send a group of nuns to his diocese. Tourneux volunteered to lead the group, accompanied by Mary of St. Stephen Etienne, Mary of St. Cyr Corbin, and Mary of St. Martin Dugree. The group left Rennes on 4 April 1855, and traveled second-class on a steamer to Buffalo. There, Tourneux became the abbess of their new monastery, and the nuns worked to establish homes for women in need.

At the request of Joseph-Bruno Guigues, the bishop of Bytown, Torneux traveled to Ottawa with four nuns to found a monastery there. The group arrived on 3 April 1866, and took up temporary lodgings on St. Patrick Street, before moving to a permanent location on Park Street. Joseph-Henri Tabaret became their chaplain and spiritual advisor. The group founded a Magdalene asylum, which they called a "refuge", where women who had "lived in sin" stayed as prisoners, worked in the laundry, and lived lives of penance and denial. In addition to the "refuge" class of young women, the nuns also maintained a "preservation" class for women who had committed "minor transgressions", and a boarding school for girls from poor families.

Torneux proceeded to found a third monastery in Toronto in 1875. She originally intended to found a fourth in St. Louis, Missouri, but disapproval from the local bishop led her to instead found it in Green Bay, Wisconsin. Tourneux died of a stroke in 1896.
