= Good Shepherd Convent, Colombo =

Good Shepherd Convent, Colombo යහපත් එඬේරාගේ කන්‍යාරාමය, කොළඹ

Location
- Kotahena, Colombo; Sri Lanka; 6.9494°N 79.8637°E

Information
- Type: Semi Government
- Motto: They conquer who believe they can
- Religious affiliation: Christianity
- Denomination: Roman Catholic
- Patron saint: St. Mary Euphrasia
- Established: May 1869; 157 years ago
- Founders: Rev. Sr. Mary Anucita Marandi; Sr. Mary Suzanne Cardiff; Sr. Euphstie Joseph; Sr. Mary Sacred Heart Masi
- Principal: Rev.Sr. Dilani Jayamanne
- Grades: Kindergarten– 13
- Gender: Female
- Age: 3 to 19
- Houses: Lilly; Violet; Rose; Marguerite
- Colors: Blue and White
- Alumni name: Shepherdians
- Website: Official website

Good Shepherd Convent, Colombo is a semi-government fee-levying Catholic girls' school and the first Catholic convent in Sri Lanka. Good Shepherd Convent, Kotahena is a leading Catholic girls' school in Colombo, Sri Lanka. Located in the neighbourhood of Kotahena, the convent school educates girls from Kindergarten to age 19.

The convent includes an auditorium, libraries, ICT and Science laboratories, Basketball and Netball courts and gyms.

== Other works of Sisters of The Good Shepherd in Sri Lanka ==
The Good Shepherd congregation marked the beginning of the sisters' mission to British Ceylon and the Far East. Nuns from this original convent opened Good Shepherd Convent, Kandy, St Mary's School in Pettah (closed) and St Bridget's Convent in Cinnamon Gardens. In 1939, sisters based in Colombo expanded to Singapore, then part of the Straits Settlements, and present-day Malaysia.

== Principals ==
period	Name
1869–1872	Mother Mary of Seven Dolores Joly
1872–1876	Mother Mary of John the Evangelist Dodsworth.
1876–1882	Mother Mary of Ignatius Lalor
1882–1893	Mother Mary of Rosalie Cleary
1894–1895	Mother Mary of Armedi Kennedy
1895–1901	Mother Mary of Veronica Curram
1901–1911	Mother Mary of Winifrid Crotty
1911–1921	Mother Mary of Prosper Walsh
1921–1924	Mother Mary of Francis Borgia Collection
1924–1928	Mother Mary of Prosper Walsh
1928–1932	Mother Immaculate conception Houghes On 10 March 1932, She became the Provincial Superior of Ceylon.
1933–1936	Mother Mary of John the Evangelist Mc Carthy.
1936–1940	Mother Mary of Gerard Connorton
1941–1946	Mother Mary of Isidore Conroy
1947–1948	Mother Mary of Paul of the Cross Williams
1948–1955	Mother Mary of St. Canice Kinsella
1956–1961	Sr. Mary of Isidore Conroy
1962–1965	Sr. Mary of St. Canice Kinsella
1966–1972	Sr. Mary of St.Sabine Crooz
1973–1984	Sr. Mary Agnes de Sampayo
1985–1990	Sr. Mary Rohini Mendis
1991–1994	Sr. Mary Lynnette Perera
2000–2002	Sr. Mary Rohini Mendis
2002–2010	Sr. Gertrude Vithanage
2011–2019	Sr. Renuka Silva
2019– present	Rev. Sr. Dilani Jayamanne

== Notable alumni ==
- Tehani Egodawela (1986 - ) Olympic, national record-holding shooter
- Leonie Kotelawala (1944-2022), Actress
- Pearl Vasudevi (1915 - 1987) Actress
- Jeevarani Kurukulasuriya (1941 -) Actress

== Sources ==
- Wright, Arnold (1907). Twentieth Century Impressions of Ceylon: Its History, People, Commerce, Industries, and Resources. Reprinted by Asian Educational Services. ISBN 9788120613355.
