= Mary of St Joseph Doyle =

Australian religious sister and convent prioress (1835–1869)

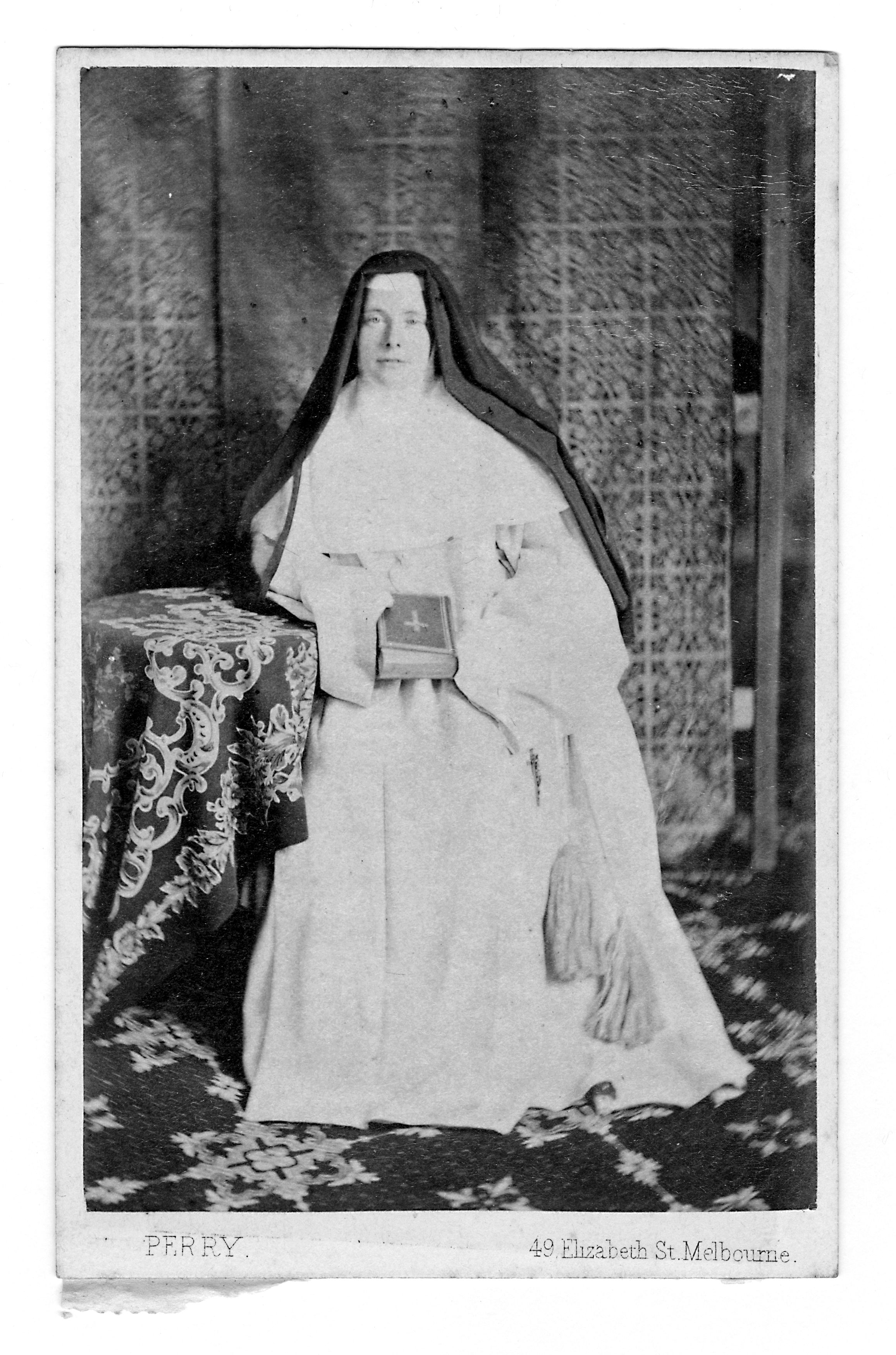
- Doyle c. 1865
- Born: Bridget Doyle; 1835; Roscore, County Offaly, Ireland
- Died: 1869 (aged 33–34); Abbotsford, Victoria, Australia
- Known for: First Prioress of the Abbotsford Convent, Melbourne

Mary of St. Joseph Doyle (born Bridget Doyle, 1835–1869) was an Irish born, religious sister, and the Founder and first Prioress of the Abbotsford Convent, in Melbourne, Australia.

== Early life ==
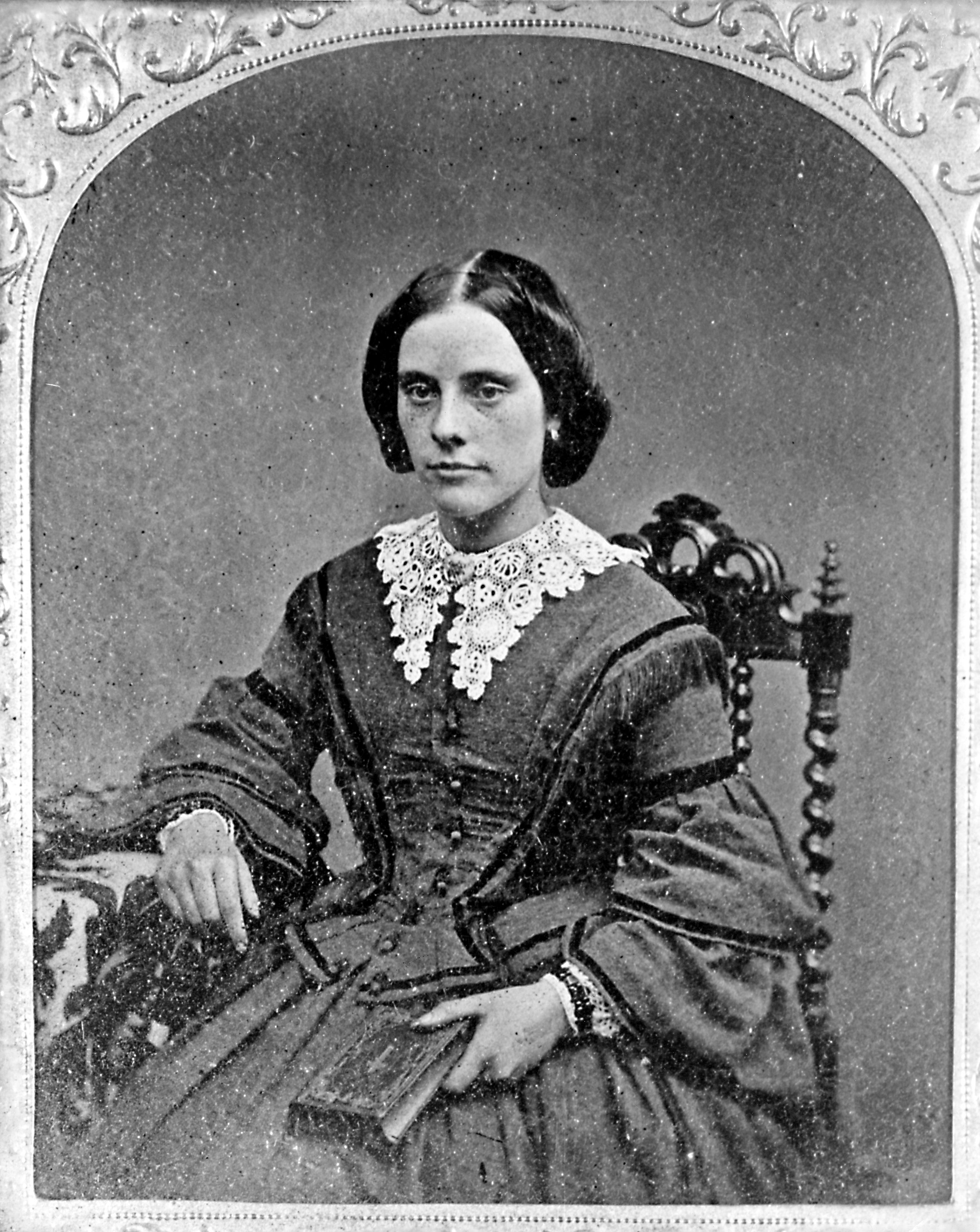
Doyle, c. 22 years old before joining Sister of the Good Shepherd

She was born in 1835, in Roscore, County Offaly, Ireland to parents John Doyle and Eliza Molloy and was baptised on August 18, 1835 in the Parish of Rahan.

== Religious vocation ==
In the 1850s, she joined the Congregation of our Lady of Charity of the Good Shepherd, at the Mother House, located in Angers, France. The order was established by Mary Euphrasia Pelletier, who was later canonized. The mission of the order was to provide a place of refuge for women who were trapped in poverty or prostitution. Upon joining the order, Bridget took the religious name of Mary of St. Joseph.

In 1863, Mary of St. Joseph, along with three other sisters from her order, emigrated to Australia. The sisters were responding to a request from the Roman Catholic Bishop of Melbourne, James Goold, who wanted to establish a reformatory for girls in his diocese. The sisters purchased a manor known as Abbotsford House, which had been built in 1840 by John Orr; the estate included six acres of land on the bank of the Yarra river. This became the Abbotsford Good Shepherd Convent. Mary of St. Joseph became prioress of the convent and the first leader of the order in Australia. As the prioress, she raised funds and oversaw the launch of a penitentiary for women and a reformatory school for girls. They later added an Industrial School.

== Death and burial ==
Mary of St. Joseph died on 13 June 1869, after months of increasing health problems and an acute illness of several weeks. Bishop Goold performed the funeral mass, which was attended by many clergy as well as the sisters of the convent. Mary of St. Joseph was buried in the convent cemetery. In 1975, when the order sold the Abbotsford Convent, her remains were relocated to the Boroondara Cemetery.

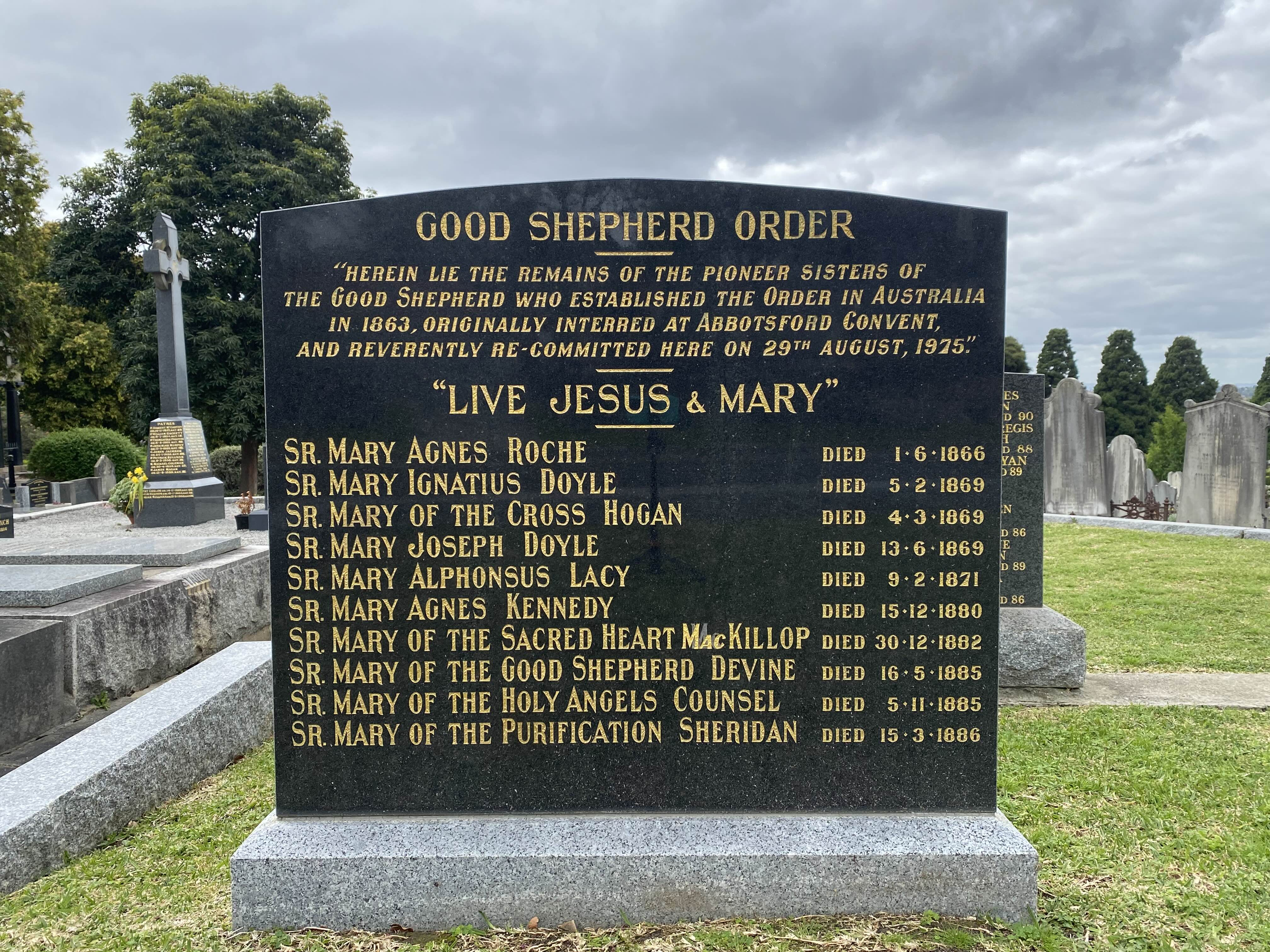
Pioneer Sisters Headstone at Boroondara Cemetery.
