= Leonie Kotelawala =

Sri Lankan actress (1944–2022)

Leonie Kotalawala ලියෝනි කොතලාවල
- Born: Leonie Ayuntha Weerasinghe; 6 May 1944; Colombo, British Ceylon
- Died: 19 June 2022 (aged 77); Colombo, Sri Lanka
- Resting place: Borella Cemetery
- Education: Good Shepherd Convent, Colombo
- Occupation: Actress
- Years active: 1951–2022
- Spouse: Tissa Kotalawala
- Children: 5
- Awards: Best Actress

Leonie Ayuntha Weerasinghe (18 September 1944 – 19 June 2022), known popularly as Leonie Kotalawala (Sinhala: ලියෝනි කොතලාවල), was an actress in Sri Lankan cinema, theatre and television. In a career spanned more than seven decades, Kotalawala is best known for becoming the first Sri Lankan stage actress to win the 1962 Best Actress Award for her performance in the play Mehew Lokaya.

== Early life ==
She was born on 18 September 1944 in Colombo, British Ceylon. She studied at Good Shepherd Convent, Colombo. Leonie was married to Tissa Kotalawala who was a photographer and later changed her name from Weerasinghe to Leonie Kotalaawala. Tissa died in 1999. She had four sons, all of whom lived abroad. She spent most of her time with her grandchildren.

According to her son, she had been ill for some time. She died at home in Colombo, Sri Lanka on 19 June 2022 at the age of 78. Her last rites were performed at the Kanatte Cemetery on 22 June 2022 and buried in the cemetery.

== Career ==
She entered the drama as a seven-year-old girl where she later became a radio dramatist, following in the footsteps of her uncle Stanley Wimalaweera, who worked in Radio Ceylon at the time. She was ranked as an A-grade singer in 1969. At the age of 12, he joined the stage and joined G. D. L. Perera's play Manamalakama. In 1961 she acted in the play Sama, followed by roles in dramas like Mehew Lokaya, Rathu Rosa and others when she was 17 years old. In 1962, she received the best actress award from Sri Lanka Arts Council for her role in that drama. In the same year, she won the Best Actress Award for her performance in the play Mehew Lokaya. In the meantime, she was lucky enough to perform under many leading radio drama producers at the time Sugathapala de Silva, Karunaratne Amarasinghe, and Bandara K. Wijethunga in the radio plays Hathalis Ekvænnā, Moraṇatænna, Kælǣmal, and Vajirā.

Soon thereafter, Perera made the movie of the same name Sama and offered her the lead role. That paved the way for her to act in movies like Chandali, Pipena Kumudu, Vajira, Punaruppaththiya, Boradiya Pokuna, Raja Daruwo, Sarasavi Diyaniyo, Sulang Kirilli, Ekamat Eka Rataka, Bandhanaya, and Davena Vihagun. Kotalawala was one of the most popular characters on the television. In 1982, she was offered her first teledrama role in Somage Sihinaya. At that point, she was getting several offers in teledrama. She made notable roles in many serials including, the role "Agidahami" in Nedeyo of Nalan Mendis, the role "Mary" in Thilak Gunawardena's Kumarihami. In 1988, she won the UNDA award for the best teledrama actress for her role "Mary" in the television serial Kumarihamy. For the same role, she also received OCIC award for best actress in the same year. Apart from popular serials Andaraweta, and Sathsara Rangana, she made contributions in many dramatic teledramas, such as, Sōmāgē Sihinaya, Chārulathā, Thārādēvi, Hiruṭa Muvāven, Charitha Thunak, Aravinda Saha Indu, Kaḍathira, Sadaham Varusā, and Kammitta.

In 2020, she was honored with a Special Award at the Raigam Tele'es.

== Filmography ==
Year	Film	Role	Ref.
1965	Saama		
1964	Chandali		
1967	Pipena Kumudu		
1981	Vajira		
1992	Raja Daruwo		
1997	Mother Teresa: In the Name of God's Poor	Hospital Nurse	
2008	A Conditional Truce (Short)	Ajit's mother	
2008	Machan	Neighbour	
2009	Ekamath Eka Rateka		
2015	Bora Diya Pokuna	Gothami's mother	
2016	Davena Vihagun	Grandmother	
2017	Bandhanaya	Alis Nona	

== See also ==
- List of Sri Lankan films of the 1960s
