= Tehani Egodawela =

Sri Lankan sports shooter

Personal information
- Born: 19 April 1986 (age 40)
- Education: Good Shepherd Convent, Nayakakanda, Wattala
- Height: 1.61 m (5 ft 3 in)
- Weight: 54 kg (119 lb)

Sport
- Sport: Shooting
Medal record
Women's shooting
Representing Sri Lanka
South Asian Games
Bronze medal – third place	2016 Guwahati	50m rifle prone team
Bronze medal – third place	2019 Kathmandu	50m rifle prone team

Tehani Egodawela (born 19 April 1986), also known as M. G. T. U. E. Egodawela, or Udeshika Egodawela is a Sri Lankan sports shooter and a current national record holder in shooting. She competed at the postponed 2020 Summer Olympics in Tokyo.

== Naval career ==
Having completed her secondary education at the Good Shepherd Convent, Colombo, she enlisted in the Sri Lanka Navy as a seaman recruit in 2011 and specialized in communicator trade. She was part of the Sri Lanka Navy Musketry Pool since 2011. By 2021, she held the rank of Leading Woman Communicator.

== Shooting career ==
She was selected as the best shooter at national level for a record seven times, representing National Pool since 2012. In 2013, she was recognized as the best women's rifle shooter at the Sri Lankan Navy Open Shooting Championships. She was awarded the bronze medal in the women's 50m rifle 3×20 event representing Sri Lanka Navy at the 2016 National Shooting Sports Federation. She represented Sri Lanka at the 2014 Commonwealth Games and competed in the 50 metre rifle prone and 50 metre rifle three positions events.

She represented Sri Lanka at the 2016 South Asian Games at a time when she gave birth to her twin baby sons. She won the bronze medal in the women's 50m rifle 0.22 team event at the 2016 South Asian Games. She also won a bronze medal in the same event at the 2019 South Asian Games. In 2018, she set the Sri Lankan national record in women's 10m air rifle 0.177 category. She also set the national record in women's 50m rifle 0.22 category at the 2019 Asian Championships.

She was selected for the postponed 2020 Summer Olympics, competing in the women's 10m air rifle 0.1777 event in the shooting category representing Sri Lanka. This was her first appearance at an Olympic competition. The 2020 Tokyo Olympics Tripartite Commission Invitation Places made Tehani eligible to take part at the delayed 2020 Olympics. Tehani was the third Sri Lankan athlete to be selected for the 2020 Tokyo Olympics after Mathilda Karlsson and Milka Gehani. The final Sri Lankan team included nine athletes in a party of fifteen chosen to go to Tokyo to represent Sri Lanka. Her coach did not travel with her to Tokyo. She was ranked 49th position with total points of 611.5 in the women's 10m air rifle.
