= Order of Our Lady of Charity =

Roman Catholic monastic order

- Ordo Dominae Nostrae de Caritate (O.D.N.C.)
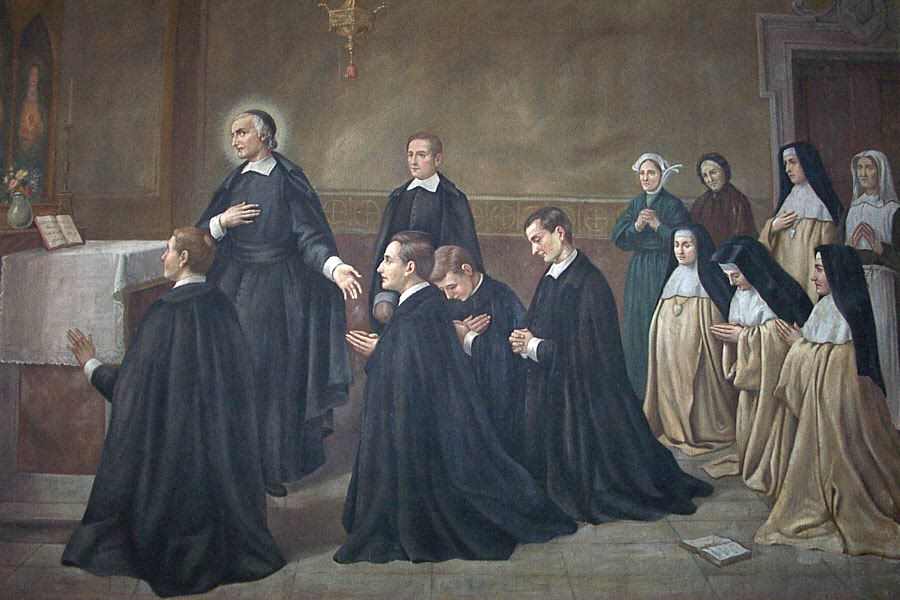
- Merged into: Congregation of Our Lady of Charity of the Good Shepherd
- Formation: 25 November 1641, in Caen, France
- Founder: John Eudes
- Type: Roman Catholic religious order
- Headquarters: Via Raffaello Sardiello, 20, 00165 Roma, Italia
- Congregational Leader: Sister Angela Fahy
- Website: www.olcint.org

The Order of Our Lady of Charity (also known as Order of Our Lady of Charity of the Refuge) is a Roman Catholic monastic order, founded in 1641 by Catholic saint, John Eudes in Caen, France.

The Order is named in honor of the Blessed Virgin Mary under the title of Our Lady of Charity. There are two branches of the congregation: contemplative, and apostolic, involved in ministries primarily with women and children around the world.

== History ==
The order originated with the priest John Eudes, who attempted to find homes for prostitutes under the care of Catholic women. One of these women, Madeleine Lamy persuaded Eudes that more was needed. Three Visitation nuns came to his aid temporarily, and, in 1641, a house was opened at Caen under the title "Refuge of Our Lady of Charity". Other women joined them, and, in 1651, the Bishop of Bayeux gave the institute his approbation. In 1664 a bull of approbation was obtained from Pope Alexander VII. That same year a house was opened at Rennes, and the institute began to spread. When the French Revolution broke out there were seven communities of the order in France.

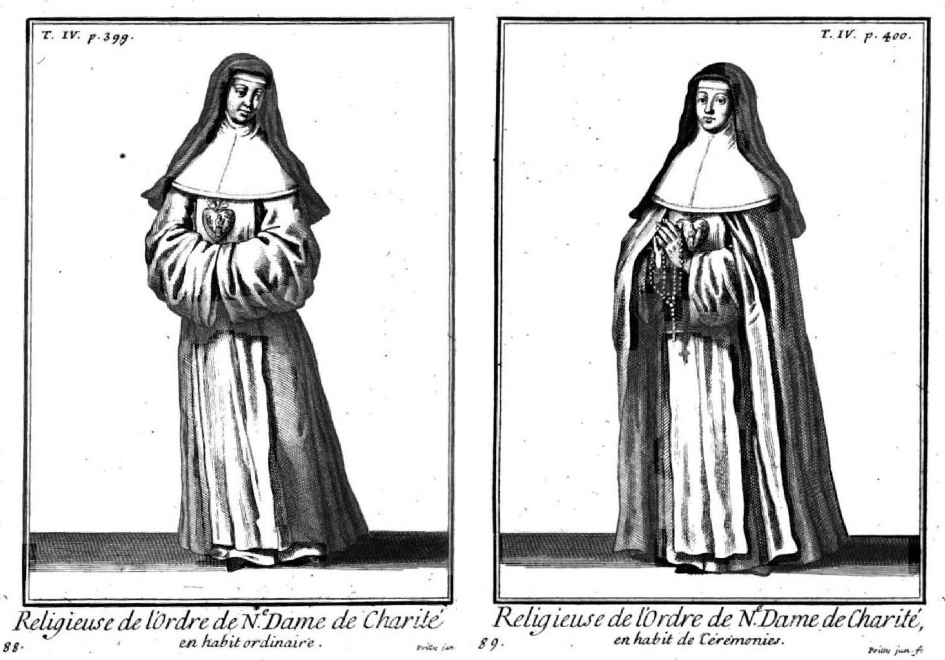
The initial habit of the sisters from the Order of Our Lady of Charity was white, with a white scapular, a black veil and a large silver heart on the breast and embossed with the figure of Our Lady of Charity. It is decorated with lilies for purity and roses for love. The heart functioned as a reliquary. In addition, the sisters wore a chaplet suspended from the belt. Much like a rosary, it is said with specified prayers dedicated to the Sacred Hearts of Jesus and Mary. On the back of the heart was engraved "Live Jesus and Mary", the order's motto. That habit has been discarded.

All the houses of this order are independent of each other, and each has its own novitiate, but the mother-house is still at Caen. The nuns wear a white habit and a large silver cross on the breast. To the three ordinary religious vows they add a fourth, viz., to devote themselves to the reformation of the fallen. The novitiate lasts two years.

On 8 July 1855, Mary of St. Jerome Tourneux of Rennes, France, established the first Foundation in North America in Buffalo, New York, and thus began the spread of the Mission of Our Lady of Charity in the United States, Canada and Mexico.

In France they had seventeen houses: one each at Caen, Saint-Brieuc, Rennes, La Rochelle, Paris, Versailles, Nantes, Lyon, Valence, Toulouse, Le Mans, Blois, Montauban, Besançon, Valognes, and two at Marseille; in Italy, one at Loreto; and in Spain, one at Bilbao; and in Austria. The sisters came to England in 1863, building a large purpose built convent at Bartestree near Hereford and by 1910 also had houses at Waterlooville near Portsmouth, Monmouth, Southampton, and Northfield. By 1960 about 1,500 sisters served in forty-four communities of Our Lady of Charity in ten countries.

== Congregation of Our Lady of Charity of the Good Shepherd ==
John Eudes had established his houses as separate and autonomous. Mary of Saint Euphrasia was the superior of the house in Tours. The city of Angers asked that Mary Euphrasia establish a convent there. She established a house in an old factory and called it Bon Pasteur ("Good Shepherd"). In 1831 she was appointed as Mother Superior of the House in Angers. However, neither the house in Tours, nor the one in Nantes was interested in expanding to Angers. Believing that the work would proceed more efficiently under a central administration, in April 1835, she obtained approval from Pope Gregory XVI for the Mother-House at Angers as the home of a separate institute known as Congregation of Our Lady of Charity of the Good Shepherd.

== Apostolate ==
Their primary apostolate is to work with women in need. Ministries include counseling, serving in parishes, counseling troubled teenage girls, day care for children and adults, rehabilitation and nursing care for the ill and elderly, people with AIDS, teaching in schools and religious education programs.

== Fusion with the Sisters of the Good Shepherd ==
Feeling the need for a restructuring of the congregation, in 1944 an American Federation of sisters was founded, followed by a French Federation in 1945, an Irish Federation in 1948, and an English Federation in 1957. The member monasteries remained autonomous with the Federation President tasked with maintaining communication among member communities. A movement toward a more centralized organization continued to develop. The Latin Union, under a Superior General was formed in 1967. On 21 March 1979, the North American Union Sisters of Our Lady of Charity received its approval from the Holy See. In North America, they are located in: Hamburg & Newburgh, NY; Erie & Pittsburgh, PA; Wheeling, WV; & El Paso, TX; Carrollton, OH; Green Bay, WI; San Diego, CA; and Mexico & Canada. An English Union was formed in 1982, and an Irish Union in 1989. The International Union of Sisters of Our Lady of Charity received approval in 1995. Only the Mexican Federation remains outside the International Union.

On 27 June 2014, after a 179-year split, the Sisters of Our Lady of Charity, founded by John Eudes, merged with the Good Shepherd Sisters, founded by Mary Euphrasia Pelletier, to form the Congregation of Our Lady of Charity of the Good Shepherd (Soeurs du Bon Pastore / Good Shepherd Sisters).

== Ireland ==
In Ireland they had two houses at Dublin. The Sisters of Charity of Our Lady of Refuge was one of four congregations involved in managing the controversial Magdalene laundries. Martin McAleese found the environment in the laundries to be harsh and involved physically demanding work, which produced a traumatic and lasting impact on the girls. However, according to the vast majority of women, the ill treatment and physical punishment present in industrial schools was not reported in the laundries.

A spokesperson for the congregation said, "The laundries which were attached to refuges were hard and demanding places to work. Many women used our refuges as a place of last resort...Regardless of why a woman was in a refuge or how she came to be there, we endeavoured to provide care. It is with sorrow and sadness that we recognise that, for many of those who spoke to the inquiry, their time in a refuge is associated with anxiety, distress, loneliness, isolation, pain and confusion and much more."

== Monastery of Our Lady of Charity and Refuge ==
The Monastery of Our Lady of Charity and Refuge, Hot Springs, Arkansas began in 1908, when five French-speaking Canadian nuns arrived in Hot Springs from Ottawa in September 1908. In 1913 the sisters began St. Michael's School for the girls who had come into their care. Because few children could pay for their education, the sisters supplemented their income with a laundry service, which they operated for over fifty years. In the 1950s, the sisters organized a childcare program serving infants and pre-school children.

On 26 September 2007, J. Gaston Hebert, diocesan administrator, announced that six of the ten sisters at the Monastery of Our Lady of Charity and Refuge had been formally excommunicated by the Roman Catholic Church for their association with a Canadian group called the Army of Mary, which the Vatican's Congregation for the Doctrine of the Faith had defined as a heretical group. The community is an autonomous religious group and not connected with any other monastery.
