= Handcrafting Justice =

Coordinates: 40°46′49.23″N 73°54′43.51″W

HandCrafting Justice
- Founded: 1997; 28 years ago
- Dissolved: 2016; 9 years ago
- Type: Non-profit organization
- Location: Queens, New York, United States

HandCrafting Justice (HCJ) was an alternative trading organization that at its prime worked with approximately 2,000 women in 18 developing countries. It was started in October 1997 as a project of the Sisters of the Good Shepherd and was dissolved in January 2016. HCJ was a member of the Fair Trade Federation and Co-op America.

== History of HCJ ==
HandCrafting Justice was created in New York City in October 1997 to develop a fair trade marketplace for handcrafted goods produced at locations sponsored by Good Shepherd Sisters in many developing countries. Through the marketing of these handcrafted goods they were able to raise awareness of the situations of women in the developing world. HandCrafting Justice also supported the women financially through their employment, allowing them to provide for their families and to improve their own lives.

The HCJ Board of Directors announced that HCJ would be closing on January 31, 2016. The fair trade ministry of Sisters of the Good Shepherd in the USA announced the news on January 14. HandCrafting Justice sold much of its remaining U.S. inventory in January through online discount sales. Buyers purchased what was left at cost and the remaining goods have been donated to charity. With the affirmation of the Good Shepherd Membership Board and the Board of Directors, the Attorney General will be asked to release any remaining funds to the Good Shepherd Mission Development Office in Rome to continue the work of capacity building for women. The HandCrafting Justice website has closed, and has a statement thanking all of the benefactors who have supported HCJ over the years. The website also carries a statement notifying visitors that HCJ is closed and the office is closed.
