= Convent of the Good Shepherd, Finchley =

Reformatory for girls in London, England

Coordinates: 51.5935°N 0.1819°W

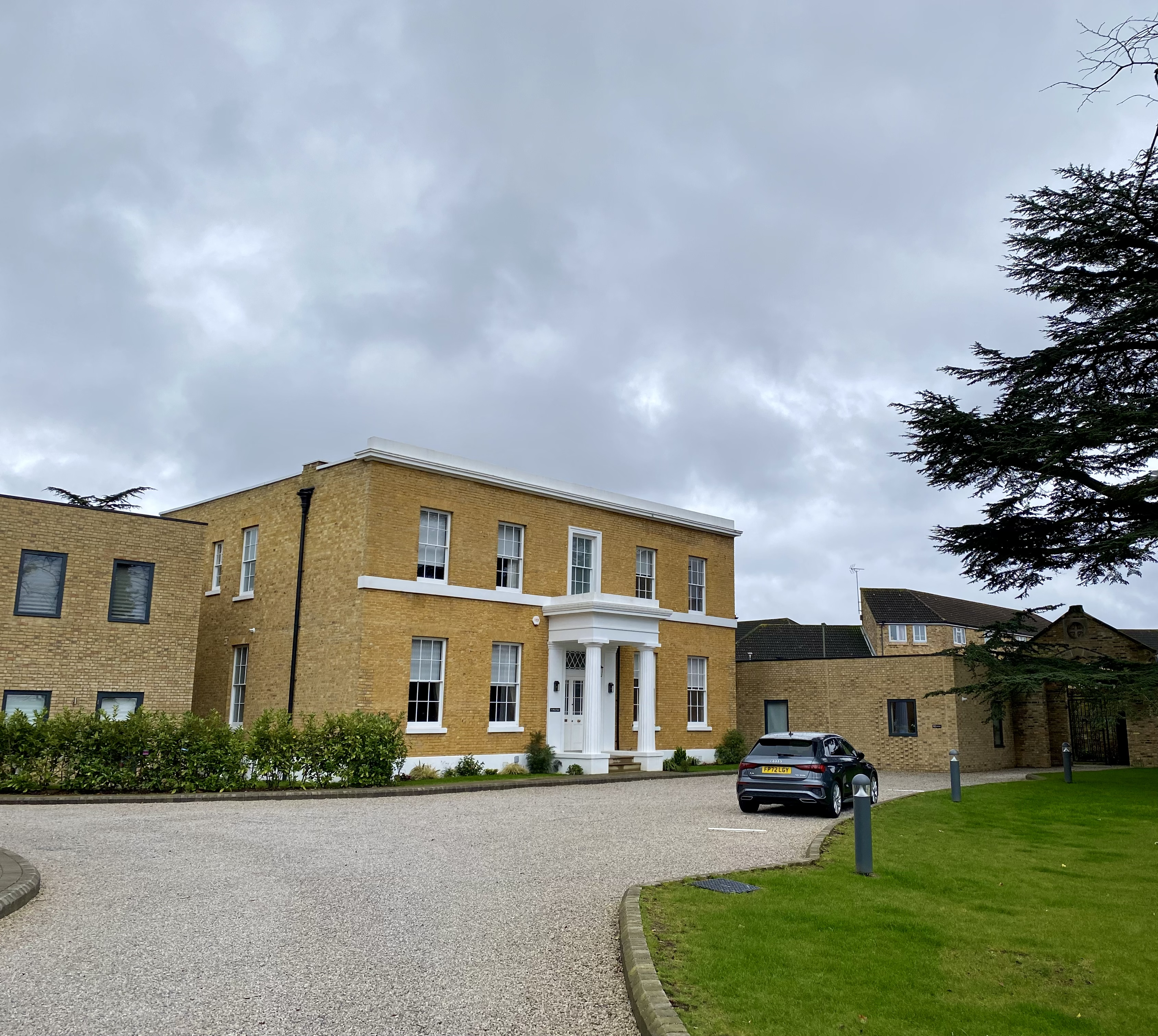
The former villa at the Convent of the Good Shepherd in 2024.

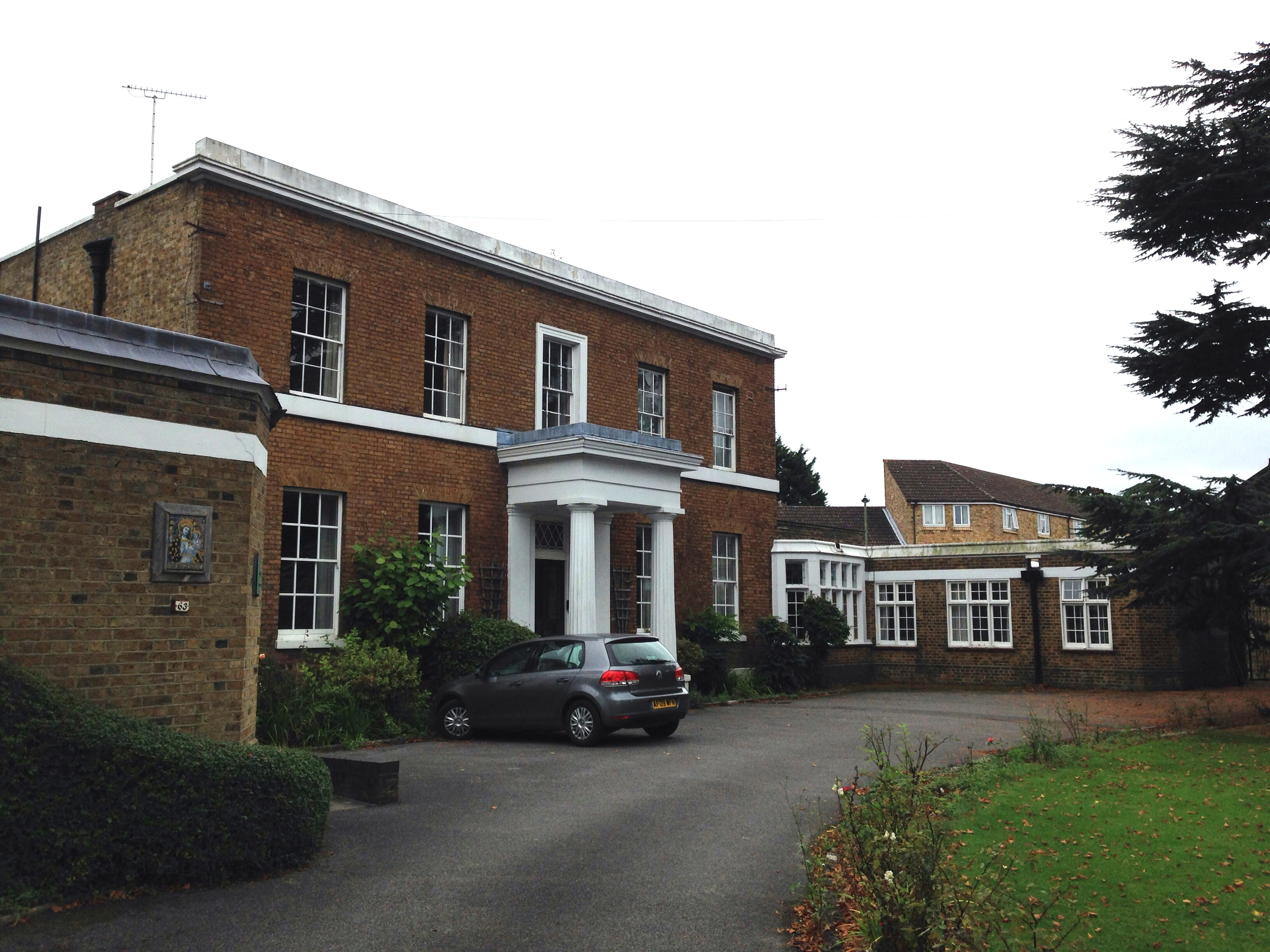
The villa in 2016 before redevelopment.

The Convent of the Good Shepherd was a reformatory for girls in East Finchley, London. The order moved to East End house in 1864, and in 1873 the building became a reformatory for former female prisoners. The convent was largely destroyed in a fire in 1972 and the grounds were redeveloped into Bishop Douglas School in 1963 and the Thomas More Estate in 1980.

The surviving villa to the convent is a grade II listed building.
