= High Council of Justice =

High Council of Justice or High Council of the Judiciary may refer to:

- High Council of Justice (Albania)
- High Council of Justice (Belgium)
- High Council of Justice (Georgia)
- High Council of the Judiciary (Italy)
- High Council of Justice (Ukraine)

== See also ==
- Council of the judiciary
