= St. Bridget's Convent, Colombo =

Private school in Colombo, Sri Lanka

St Bridget's Convent

Location
- C. W. W. Kannangara Road; Colombo, 07; Sri Lanka

Information
- Type: private
- Motto: Gently and firmly
- Religious affiliation: Roman Catholic
- Established: 1902
- Grades: Nursery - Grade 14
- Gender: Girls
- Colors: Green, white
- Website: www.stbridgets.lk

St. Bridget's Convent is a private girls' school in Colombo, Sri Lanka. It was founded on February 1, 1902 by the Sisters of the Good Shepherd order, making it one of the earliest mission schools of the Roman Catholic Church of Ireland in Ceylon. The school today consists of a Montessori school, a primary school and a collegiate school. It comprises 1324 students taught by a staff of 105 teachers.

== History ==
On 1 February 1902, at the request of Dr. T. A. Melizan (Archbishop of Colombo), St. Bridget's Convent was established as the second house of the Good Shepherd congregation for the education of young ladies. It was the third school in the Colombo area opened by the nuns. The first classes were held at a rented house on Turret Road (Colpetty) called 'The Firs'. Two sisters, Sr. Mary of St. Francis Borgia and Sr. Mary of Our lady of Lourdes, came from the original Kotahena Convent school (Good Shepherd Convent) to undertake this work. With the opening of the school by the sisters of the Good Shepherd, the vision of Melizan became a reality.

== Symbols ==
The Irish origins of the Good Shepherd sisters are seen in the school colours, emblem and unique traditions.

Emblem

The school emblem depicts in essence the heart of the school. The rationale for its functioning and for its role within and without is reflected in the school motto ‘Gently and Firmly’. The other symbols include:

- Fountain: symbolises fountain of learning
- Dark green leaves and shamrock: the sisters' resilience and Irish origins
- Shepherd's Crook: refers to the Good Shepherd sisters and God as the Good Shepherd who looks after his fold and guides them safely across the path

Patron saint

The patron saint of the school is St. Bridget, the patron saint of Ireland, whose feast is commemorated on 1 February of each year.

== Houses ==
There are 4 houses in the primary school and the collegiate school:

- Borgia House - motto "Charity to All, Malice to None"
- Coudert House - motto "Fidelity to Duty is the Path to Glory"
- Griaux House - motto "Onwards and Upwards"
- Melizan House - motto "United We Stand, Divided We Fall"

The houses are named for Dr. T.A. Melizan, Mother St. Francis Borgia, Father G. Griaux and Dr. A. Coudert, who were involved in the development of the school from the start.

== Notable alumni ==
| Name | Year/degree | Notability | Reference |
|---|---|---|---|
| Chandrika Kumaratunga | | Chief Minister of Western Province (1993–1994), Prime Minister of Sri Lanka (1994), President of Sri Lanka (1994–2005) | |
| Sirimavo Bandaranaike | | Member of Parliament Attanagalla (1965–1980), Prime Minister of Sri Lanka (1960–1965,1970–1972, 1994–2000) World's first female Prime Minister. | |
| Sunethra Bandaranaike | | socialite, philanthropist (founder and chair of Sunera Foundation) | |
| Ezlynn Deraniyagala | | Sri Lanka's first female barrister | |
| Mignonne Fernando | | singer, songwriter and pianist | |
| Lakmali Karunanayake | | Judge of the Court of Appeal of Sri Lanka | |
