= List of acts of the Northern Ireland Assembly from 2013 =

This is a list of acts of the Northern Ireland Assembly passed in 2013. Acts of the Northern Ireland Assembly are enacted by the Northern Ireland Assembly, which has legislative authority over devolved matters in relation to Northern Ireland under the authority of the Northern Ireland Act 1998. Acts are cited by calendar year, in the same fashion as acts of Parliament of the United Kingdom. Each act passed in a respective year is given a chapter number (abbreviated "c.") denoted by Arabic numerals, and citations are usually followed by the suffix "(N.I.)" so as to prevent confusion with acts of Parliament of the United Kingdom.

10 acts of the Northern Ireland Assembly were passed in 2013.

indicates that an act has been transcribed on Wikisource, indicates that an act is available to view at legislation.gov.uk, and indicates the location of the original act in the Parliamentary Archives.

== Acts of the Northern Ireland Assembly ==
Short title	Citation	Royal assent
Long title
Superannuation Act (Northern Ireland) 2013	2013 c. 1 (N.I.)	9 January 2013
An Act to make provision for and in connection with limiting the value of the benefits which may be provided under so much of any scheme under Article 3 of the Superannuation (Northern Ireland) Order 1972 (Note: Superannuation (Northern Ireland) Order 1972 (SI 1972/1073)) as provides by virtue of Article 4(2) of that Order for benefits to be provided by way of compensation to or in respect of persons who suffer loss of office or employment; and to make provision about the procedure for modifying such a scheme.
Inquiry into Historical Institutional Abuse Act (Northern Ireland) 2013	2013 c. 2 (N.I.)	18 January 2013
An Act to make provision relating to an inquiry into institutional abuse between 1922 and 1995.
Charities Act (Northern Ireland) 2013	2013 c. 3 (N.I.)	18 January 2013
An Act to amend the Charities Act (Northern Ireland) 2008; (Note: Charities Act (Northern Ireland) 2008 (c. 12 (N.I.))) to transfer certain functions of the Department for Social Development to the Charity Commission for Northern Ireland; and for connected purposes.
Budget Act (Northern Ireland) 2013 (repealed)	2013 c. 4 (N.I.)	14 March 2013
An Act to authorise the issue out of the Consolidated Fund of certain sums for the service of the years ending 31st March 2013 and 2014; to appropriate those sums for specified purposes; to authorise the Department of Finance and Personnel to borrow on the credit of the appropriated sums; to authorise the use for the public service of certain resources for the years ending 31st March 2013 and 2014; and to revise the limits on the use of certain accruing resources in the year ending 31st March 2013. (Repealed by Budget (No. 2) Act (Northern Ireland) 2016 (c. 30 (N.I.)))
Business Improvement Districts Act (Northern Ireland) 2013	2013 c. 5 (N.I.)	21 March 2013
An Act to make provision for business improvement districts and for connected purposes.
Water and Sewerage Services (Amendment) Act (Northern Ireland) 2013	2013 c. 6 (N.I.)	25 April 2013
An Act to enable the Department for Regional Development to continue to make payments to water and sewerage undertakers for a limited period; and to make provision requiring certain notices to be registered in the Statutory Charges Register.
Criminal Justice Act (Northern Ireland) 2013	2013 c. 7 (N.I.)	25 April 2013
An Act to amend the law relating to sex offender notification, sexual offences prevention orders and human trafficking; to provide for the destruction, retention, use and other regulation of certain fingerprints and DNA samples and profiles; to provide for the release on licence of persons detained under Article 45(2) of the Criminal Justice (Children) (Northern Ireland) Order 1998; (Note: Criminal Justice (Children) (Northern Ireland) Order 1998 (SI 1998/1504)) to amend Article 21BA of the Criminal Evidence (Northern Ireland) Order 1999; (Note: Criminal Evidence (Northern Ireland) Order 1999 (SI 1999/2789)) to abolish the common law offence of scandalising the judiciary; and to permit criminal proceedings on Sunday at certain times.
Civil Service (Special Advisers) Act (Northern Ireland) 2013	2013 c. 8 (N.I.)	8 July 2013
An Act to amend the law on special advisers in the Northern Ireland Civil Service.
Budget (No. 2) Act (Northern Ireland) 2013 (repealed)	2013 c. 9 (N.I.)	18 July 2013
An Act to authorise the issue out of the Consolidated Fund of certain sums for the service of the year ending 31st March 2014; to appropriate those sums for specified purposes; to authorise the Department of Finance and Personnel to borrow on the credit of the appropriated sums; to authorise the use for the public service of certain resources (including accruing resources) for the year ending 31st March 2014; and to repeal certain spent provisions. (Repealed by Budget (No. 2) Act (Northern Ireland) 2016 (c. 30 (N.I.)))
Marine Act (Northern Ireland) 2013	2013 c. 10 (N.I.)	17 September 2013
An Act to provide for marine plans in relation to the Northern Ireland inshore region; to provide for marine conservation zones in that region; to make further provision in relation to marine licensing for certain electricity works in that region; and for connected purposes.
