= Lakmali Karunanayake =

Sri Lankan judge of the Court of Appeal since 2026

The Honourable Lakmali Karunanayake PC

Judge of the Court of Appeal of Sri Lanka
- Incumbent
- Assumed office 3 September 2026
- Appointed by: Anura Kumara Dissanayake

Personal details
- Born: Sajeewani Dilka Lakmali Karunannayake
- Education: University of Colombo (LL.M.); Sri Lanka Law College; St. Bridget's Convent, Colombo

Sajeewani Dilka Lakmali Karunannayake, PC is a Sri Lankan lawyer who serves as a judge of the Court of Appeal of Sri Lanka since 3 September 2026.

== Early life and education ==
Karunannayake is an alumnus of St. Bridget's Convent, Colombo. She graduated from Sri Lanka Law College with first class honours. She earned a Master of Laws (LL.M.) from the University of Colombo in 2014, specialising in public international law, and a diploma in transitional justice from International Center for Transitional Justice in Cape Town, South Africa in 2006.

== Career ==
Karunannayake previously served as an Additional Solicitor General at the Attorney General's Department having joined the department in 1998. She was sworn in as a President's Counsel on 20 November 2025.

On 3 September 2026, she was elevated as a judge of the Court of Appeal by President Anura Kumara Dissanayake.
