= Congregation of Our Lady of Charity of the Good Shepherd =

Catholic religious order

- Congregationis Sororum a Bono Pastore
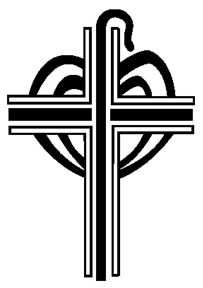
- Abbreviation: Religious of the Good Shepherd (RGS)
- Formation: 1835
- Founder: Mary Euphrasia Pelletier
- Type: Catholic religious order
- Headquarters: Via Raffaello Sardiello, 20; 00165 Rome, Italy
- Congregational Leader: Joan Marie Lopez
- Website: www.olcgs.org

The Congregation of Our Lady of Charity of the Good Shepherd, also known as the Sisters of the Good Shepherd, is a Catholic religious order that was founded in 1835 by Mary Euphrasia Pelletier in Angers, France. The religious sisters belong to a Catholic international congregation of religious women dedicated to promoting the welfare of women and girls.

The Congregation has a representative at the United Nations, and has spoken out against human trafficking.

In some countries' laundries and other institutions that were run by the Sisters, it was found that historically girls remanded to their care were forced to work, unpaid, in the laundries, where the environment was harsh and involved physically demanding work.

== History ==
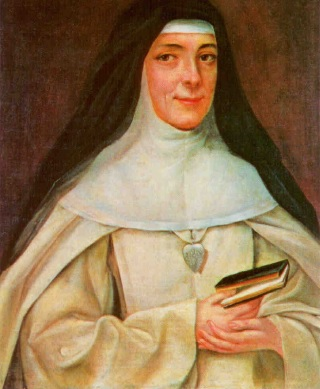
Mother Mary Euphrasia Pelletier, the foundress of the Congregation

The Congregation of the Sisters of the Good Shepherd began as a branch of the Order of Our Lady of Charity (Ordo Dominae Nostrae de Caritate), founded in 1641 by John Eudes, at Caen, France, and dedicated to the care, rehabilitation, and education of girls and young women in difficulty. Some of the girls were abandoned by their families or orphaned, and some had turned to prostitution in order to survive. The Sisters provided shelter, food, vocational training and an opportunity for these girls and women to turn their lives around.

The Congregation of the Sisters of the Good Shepherd was founded by Rose Virginie Pelletier in Angers, France, in 1835. Rose was the daughter of a medical doctor and his wife, known for their generosity to the poor. At the age of eighteen, she joined the Congregation of Sisters of Our Lady of Charity in Tours and was given her the name Mary of Saint Euphrasia. At the age of twenty-nine, she became mother superior of the convent.

== Contemplative Community ==
While Mother Prioress at the Tours Convent of the Order of Our Lady of Charity of the Refuge, Mary Euphrasia formed a group of contemplative nuns, named the Sisters Magdalens (based in a devotion to Mary Magdalene's conversion). In August 1964, they were renamed Sisters of the Cross, and in July 1987, they were again renamed the Contemplative Sisters of the Good Shepherd.

During the 2005 General Chapter, it was clarified that the Congregation of the Sisters of the Good Shepherd is one congregation with two separate lifestyles, apostolic and contemplative.

This group of nuns was open to any woman from any class who wished to live a cloistered life, but were ineligible to become Sisters of Our Lady of Charity. On November 11, 1825, four young women began their novitiate with a short rule given to them by Archbishop de Montblanc of Tours, which followed the Rule of the Third Order of Our Lady of Mount Carmel.

They lived their religious life in solitude, prayer, and penance. They also undertook physical work, and they earned their own way with intricate embroidery, making altar bread and working with bees.

== Angers, France ==
In 1829, the Bishop of Angers, in France, requested a home be established in his diocese. Soon requests arrived from other cities. Each convent of the Order of Our Lady of Charity was independent and autonomous, with neither shared resources nor provisions for transferring personnel as needed. Mary Euphrasia Pelletier envisioned a new governing structure that would free the sisters to respond more readily to requests for assistance. She appealed to Rome for approval to establish a new religious congregation, and the congregation of the Sisters of Our Lady of Charity of the Good Shepherd was founded in 1835, with the motherhouse in Angers.

Mary Euphrasia Pelletier was Mother-General of the Sisters of the Good Shepherd for 33 years, and at her death in 1868, she left 2067 professed sisters, 384 novices, 309 Touriere sisters (outdoor sisters who were not cloistered), 962 Sisters Magdalen, caring for 6372 "penitents", and 8483 children. In her lifetime 110 Good Shepherd convents were established in places as various as Rome, Italy (1838), Munich, Germany (1839) and Mons, Belgium (1839).

== Expansion ==
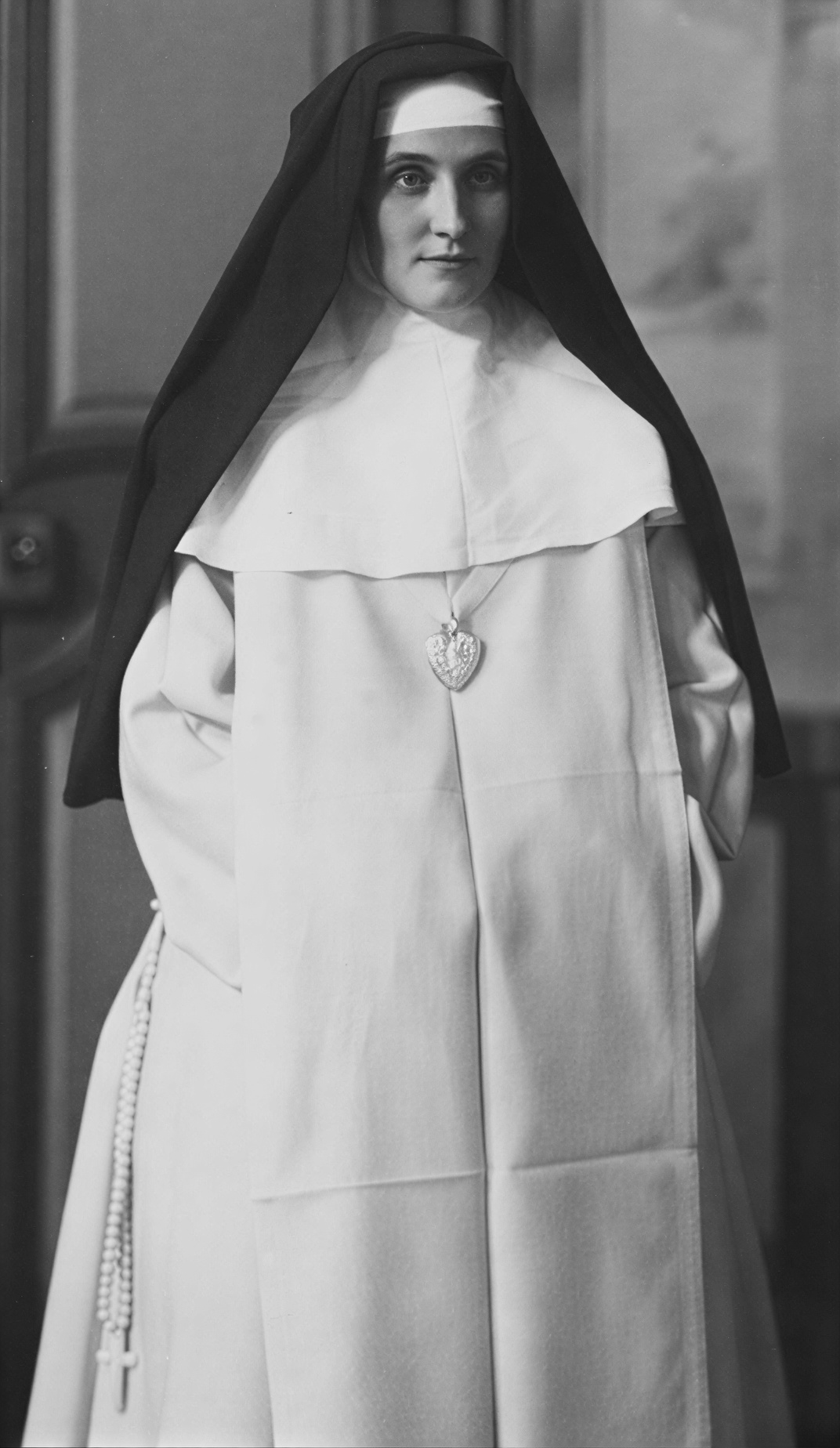
Mary of the Divine Heart Droste zu Vischering was a mystical nun of the Congregation of the Good Shepherd, beatified by the Catholic Church

The first convent of the Good Shepherd in Great Britain was founded in London in 1841 and then in Dalbeth, Glasgow in 1851, moving to Bishopton, Renfrewshire in 1953. They arrived in Montreal, Canada in 1844, and in Toronto in 1944. The sisters arrived in Melbourne, Australia in 1862. Additional convents were founded in El-Biar, Algeria (1843), Cairo, Egypt (1846), Limerick, Ireland (1848), Vienna, Austria (1853), Bangalore, India (1854), San Felipe, Chile (1855), Malta (1858), Leiderdorp, Holland (1860), and Rangoon, Burma (1866).

Under her successor, Mary Saint Peter Coudenhove, in twenty-four years, eighty-five houses were founded, and thirteen new provinces established: eleven in Europe, two in Africa, nine in North America, five in South America and one in Oceania. The Ceylon (Sri Lanka) Mission was founded in 1869 and the convent continues to function as a religious community and school. From Ceylon, the Good Shepherd Sisters went to Singapore in 1939 and to Malaysia in 1956.

Starting around 1938, over time eleven monasteries of Our Lady of Charity in four countries joined the Sisters of the Good Shepherd.

Since 1939 the Sisters have operated a convent in Singapore Since then they diversified into other ministries ranging from education to social welfare. In 1958 they opened Marymount Convent School, a girls' primary school.

In Thailand in 2021, Piyachat Boonmul of the Sisters of the Good Shepherd was appointed by the Thai government to a national advisory role in a committee with tasks of coordinating plans for the prevention and suppression of prostitution, establishment of shelters and protection, and setting regulations for detainees' acceptance and care.

== In the United States ==
In 1842 Mary Euphrasia sent the first five Sisters to Louisville, Kentucky, to establish houses in the United States. From Louisville new foundations spread across the country. From 1893 to 1910 authorities in Davenport, Iowa placed 260 underage girls in Good Shepherd Homes in Omaha, Peoria, Dubuque, and elsewhere. Some of these girls were taken from brothels or dangerous home environments. This was seen as an alternative to sending them to the Iowa Industrial School for Girls in Mitchellville. According to Sharon E. Wood, "Throughout the 1880s and 1890s, reformers increasingly promoted private institutions as the best way to deal with problem girls."

When the Sisters of the Good Shepherd arrived in St. Paul in 1868, their mission was to serve the needs of the homeless, wayward, and criminal girls and women. The Sisters developed two distinct programs: the first, was the care of girls who came from failing homes. The second served former prostitutes or delinquent girls, a majority of which were sent there by the civil courts. At the conclusion of their court-ordered stay, most women returned to their communities. However, they had the option to remain with the sisters in a semi-religious status, living at the House, praying, assisting with chores, and easily able to come and go, or to become a full-fledged “Magdalen” nun, contemplative and cloistered within the House of the Good Shepherd. Lovina Benedict opened a home in Des Moines under the auspices of the Women's Christian Temperance Union. It was based on the Good Shepherd Home she had visited in St. Paul, Minnesota. In Wood's view the Davenport use of the Good Shepherd Homes "anticipated the juvenile court system created by Progressive reformers a few years later".

By 1895, the Sisters of the Good Shepherd cared for numerous poor elderly men including disabled Civil War veterans at a large asylum at 5010 North Avenue in Milwaukee. They later moved to a facility at 8730 W. Bluemound Road.

New York City Police Commissioner Theodore Roosevelt (1895) was a firm supporter of the work of the Congregation. From 1928 to 1975, the Sisters operated Villa Loretto in Peekskill, New York. On February 14, 2000 the four Provinces of Cincinnati, St. Louis, Washington and St. Paul merged to become the Province of Mid-North America.

The Good Shepherd Sisters in Seattle ran a home for young women, most of whom were runaways, referred to the nuns by juvenile courts that deemed them "incorrigible". "The perception was that unwed mothers were sent there, but they weren't," said Sister Vera Gallagher. "In order to protect the girls, we really didn't tell the community much about what we were doing; and, because nobody knew, that was what they imagined. But they were just high-energy girls who had no place to go.". Deborah Mullins, the youngest of twelve from a divorced family, said the Good Shepherd nuns "[W]ere the best thing that ever happened to me. ...They never screamed at you when you did something wrong. They'd be just totally disappointed in you, and that would make you know what you needed to do." They ran a laundry, washing the sheets and tablecloths used by the railroad. The Sisters also gave the girls money to buy new clothes. "We weren't all rosaries and stations of the cross," said Sheilah Nichols Castor. "You had to be able to type, you had to be able to take shorthand, and you had to be able to cook something. When I came out, of course, I could only cook in batches of 30."

In 1867, the Sisters came to the Roman Catholic Archdiocese of Boston, where they ran the House of the Good Shepherd on Mission Hill in Boston for nearly a century. The Sisters moved their school to Marlborough, Massachusetts in 1964, where they provided a therapeutic residential program for girls until 1985.

In 1993, the Woburn-based Cummings Foundation purchased the property and renovated it into the upscale independent and assisted living community, New Horizons. The Sisters continue to live there today rent-free, and offer residents daily Masses in the Cardinal Cushing Chapel.

== Treatment of inmates ==
=== Australia ===
At the request of the Melbourne bishop James Goold, four sisters, led by Mary of St Joseph Doyle, arrived in Australia in 1863. They established the Abbotsford Convent, and the first women's penitentiary and reform school for girls. The convent was established carry out the heart of the Good Shepherd mission, that of providing refuge for women deemed outcasts of society. From the early 1890s to the 1960s, most Australian state capitals had a Magdalene asylum, also known as Magdalene laundry, a large convent where teenage girls were placed. According to James Franklin, the girls came from a variety of very disturbed and deprived backgrounds and were individually hard to deal with in many cases. The asylums were initially established as refuges, with the residents free to leave. In the early 1900s, they reluctantly began to accept court referrals. "They took in girls whom no-one else wanted and who were forcibly confined, contrary to the wishes of both the girls and the nuns."

Like orphanages, they received almost no government funds. Laundry work was regarded as suitable as it did not require much training nor substantial capital expense. The nuns shared the conditions of the inmates, such as bland food, hard work, the confinement and the long periods of silence. Education for residents was either of poor quality or lacking altogether. The state-run Parramatta Girls Home, which also had a laundry, had similar harsh conditions but a worse record for assaults.

In 2004 the Australian Parliament released a report that included Good Shepherd laundries in Australia for criticism. "We acknowledge" [writes the Australian Province Leader Sister Anne Manning] "that for numbers of women, memories of their time with Good Shepherd are painful. We are deeply sorry for acts of verbal or physical cruelty that occurred: such things should never have taken place in a Good Shepherd facility. The understanding that we have been the cause of suffering is our deep regret as we look back over our history."

=== United Kingdom ===
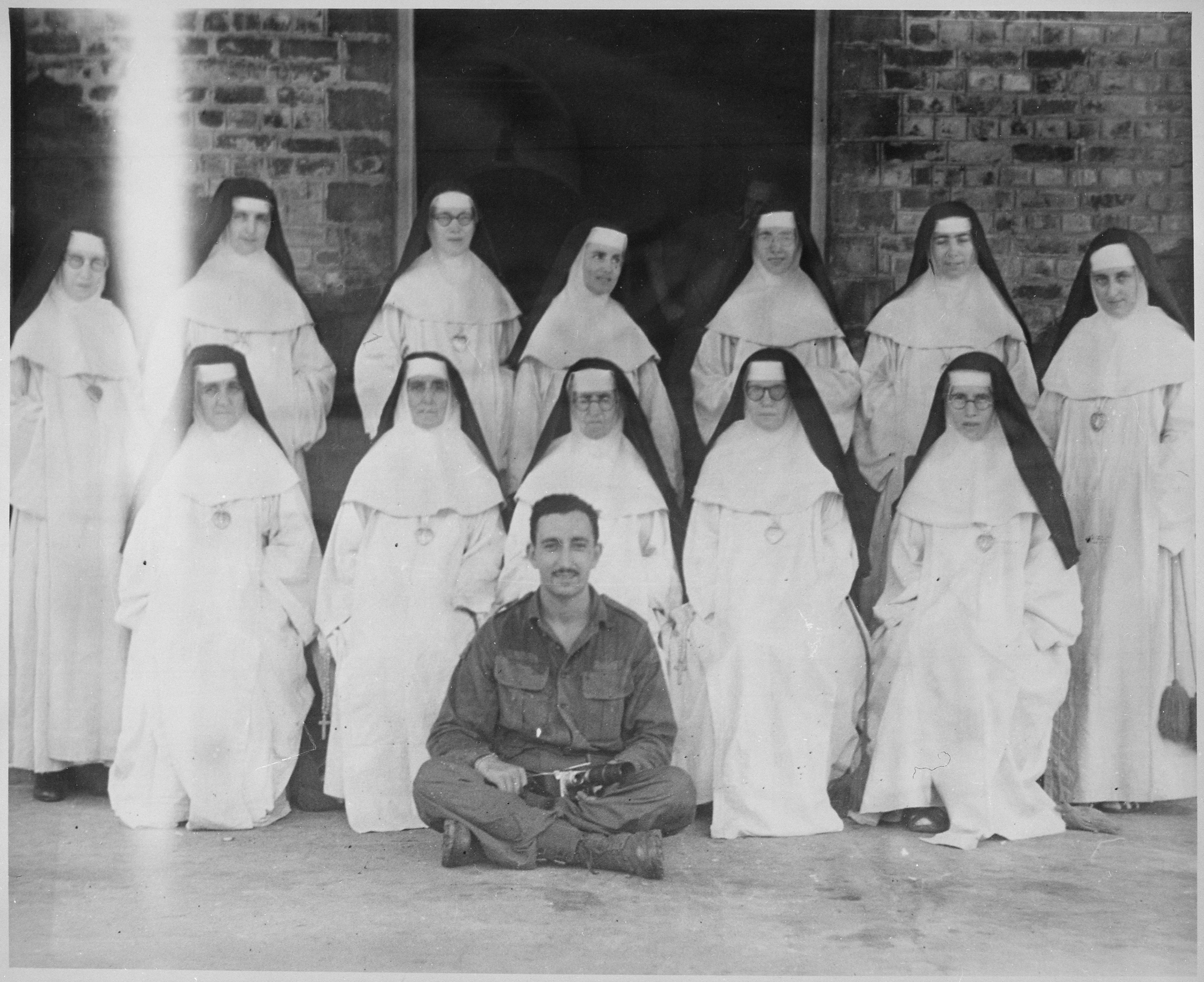
Thirteen Irish nuns who had been interned in the Rangoon City Jail by the Japanese, Burma, May 28, 1945.

The Congregation ran institutions which provided residential accommodation for children and adults in Belfast, Derry and Newry in Northern Ireland. These institutions were the subject of the two-week Module 12 of the Northern Ireland Historical Institutional Abuse Inquiry into sexual and physical abuse of children—not taking into account young women over the age of 18, the majority of residents—starting on 7 March 2016.

The inquiry, under retired judge Sir Anthony Hart, published its report on 20 January 2017. In regard to the Good Shepherd Sisters facilities in Belfast, Derry and Newry, Hart said there had been "unacceptable practices" of young girls being forced to do industrial work in the laundries. He recommended state-backed compensation of £7,500 to £100,000 per person for victims of historic child abuse in Northern Ireland, with the maximum for those who had experienced severe abuse or been transported to Australia in the controversial Home Children migrant scheme. An apology on behalf of the Sisters said "we regret that some of our former residents have painful memories of the time spent in our care."

The Sisters also ran residential institutions in Scotland, and were involved in transportation of children to Australia, as there was a Catholic presence there.

=== Ireland ===
The Ireland branch of the congregation has been accused of labor abuse, with inmates forced by nuns to perform laborious work in laundries and factory-like setups for pocket-money pay for companies such as Hasbro.

In Dublin in 1993, the order sold land to property developers in High Park, Drumcondra, that partly included a graveyard containing the mass grave of former inmates of its Magdalene Laundry. After seeking an exhumation order from the authorities to remove 133 bodies from the mass grave, it was found that the grave actually contained 155 bodies. They were eventually cremated and the ashes reinterred in Glasnevin Cemetery. The resulting scandal caused a re-evaluation of the Order's work in Ireland, though the order still has to pay promised compensation to former inmates.

=== The Netherlands ===
The Dutch branch of the congregation has been accused of labor abuse, with inmates forced by nuns to perform unpaid labor in laundries and sewing workshops between 1860 and 1973. One of the interviewed victims also mentioned rape, claims on the heritage of orphans to pay for living costs, while performing unpaid labour. Questions have been submitted in parliament; after a dismissive ministerial response a civil claim in court was announced in 2018 by 19 victims. Women were renamed and forced to work every day except Sunday. 'Rebellious' girls were sedated. Women who escaped despite the high walls were detained and returned by the police. Nutrition was poor, the regime was harsh, and medical care inadequate; hundreds of girls and women died. The 'Death List of the Special Cemetery' of the asylum in Velp has 214 names.

=== Apology ===
On 11 March 2022 ministers from the five main political parties in Northern Ireland and six abusing institutions made statements of apology in the Northern Ireland Assembly.

The six institutions that apologised for carrying out abuse were De La Salle Brothers, represented by Francis Manning; the Sisters of Nazareth, represented by Cornelia Walsh; the Sisters of St Louis represented by Uainin Clarke; the Good Shepherd Sisters, represented by Cait O'Leary; Barnardo's in Northern Ireland, represented by Michele Janes; and Irish Church Missions, represented by Mark Jones. In live reporting after the apology, BBC News reported that Jon McCourt from Survivors North West said "If what happened today was the best that the church could offer by way of an apology they failed miserably. There was no emotion, there was no ownership. ... I don't believe that the church and institutions atoned today." He called on the intuitions to "do the right thing" and contribute to the redress fund for survivors, saying that institutions have done similar for people in Scotland. McCourt praised the government ministers' apologies; they had "sat and thought out and listened to what it was we said.", but said that the institutions had failed to do this, leading to some victims having to leave the room while they were speaking, "compound[ing] the hurt." Others angry at the institutions' apologies included Caroline Farry, who attended St Joseph's Training School in Middletown from 1978-1981, overseen by nuns from the Sisters of St Louis, Pádraigín Drinan from Survivors of Abuse, and Alice Harper, whose brother, a victim of the De La Salle Brothers, had since died. Peter Murdock, from campaign group Savia, was at Nazareth Lodge Orphanage with his brother (who had recently died); he likened the institution to an "SS camp". He said "It's shocking to hear a nun from the institution apologising ... it comes 30 years too late ... people need to realise that it has to come from the heart. They say it came from the heart but why did they not apologise 30 years ago?"

== Apostolate ==
The Congregation of Our Lady of Charity of the Good Shepherd was a cloistered order in the past, but is now mostly apostolic. Members follow the Rule of Saint Augustine. The contemplative and apostolic branches were once separate but have since merged. There are now two lifestyles in one institute.

The sisters work in the areas of: community outreach, special education, social work, youth development, nurses, and post abortion counseling. They serve as administrator, psychologists, hospital chaplains, and prison ministers. The Sisters of the Good Shepherd are active in fighting against prostitution and human trafficking in poor countries of Asia. They also work in an international fair trade partnership with women and those in social and economic distress through Handcrafting Justice.

- The sisters in Canada initiated the "Sharing Fair" Program which markets goods produced by women in developing countries.
- In 1976 the sisters in Ethiopia started the Bethlehem Training Center. A group of women was selected to learn rug and carpet weaving in the traditional Ethiopian style; teenagers started needlework, basket-making and cotton-spinning classes. Literacy classes were also added.
- Since 1987 sisters in the Philadelphia area have run CORA (Counseling and Referral Assistance) Services. Programs include a job-placement program for youths, a counseling service for pregnant adolescents and an assistance program for both employers and employees to help workers with drug, alcohol or other problems.

The contemplative sisters continue to be devoted to prayer and they support themselves by: making vestments, supplying altar breads to parishes, artistic works, creative computer work – designing graphics, cards and composing music.

As of 2010 the Congregation of the Sisters of the Good Shepherd was an international order of religious women in the Roman Catholic Church with its some 4,000 nuns work in 70 countries across the world.

== Superior Generals (Congregational Leaders) ==
• St. Mary Euphrasia Pelletier, from 1835-1868.

• Mother Mary of St. Peter de Coudenhove, from 1868-1892.

• Mother Mary of St. Marina Verger, from 1892-1905.

• Mother Mary of St. Domitilla La Rose, from 1905-1928.

• Mother Mary of St. John of the Cross Balzer, from 1928-1940.

• Sister Mary of St. Ursula Jung, from 1940-1960.

• Sister Mary Aquinas Lee, from 1960-1973.

• Sister Bernadette Fox, from 1973-1985.

• Sister Gema Cadena, from 1985-1991.

• Sister Liliane Tauvette, from 1991-2004.

• Sister Brigid Lawlor, from 2004-2016.

• Sister Ellen Kelly, from 2016-2021.

• Sister Joan Marie Lopez, from 2021-Current.

== See also ==
- Mary of the Divine Heart
- Sister Gerard Fernandez
- Mother Mary of St. Joseph Doyle
- Antonia Luzmila Rivas López
- Sophie-Thérèse de Soubiran La Louvière
