= Mary Euphrasia Pelletier =

19th-century French Roman Catholic religious sister and saint

Saint Mary Euphrasia Pelletier RGS
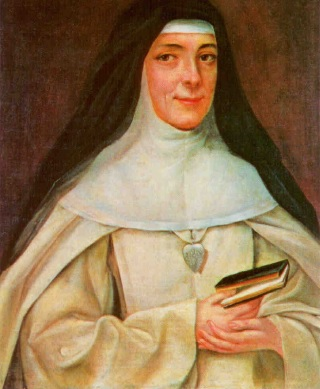
- 19th century image of Mary Euphrasia Pelletier by an unknown artist

Virgin
- Born: Rose Virginie Pelletier; 31 July 1796; Noirmoutier-en-l'Île, France
- Died: 24 April 1868 (aged 71); Angers, France
- Venerated in: Catholic Church
- Beatified: 30 April 1933, St. Peter's Basilica, Vatican City by Pope Pius XI
- Canonized: 2 May 1940, St. Peter's Basilica by Pope Pius XII
- Major shrine: Abbaye Saint-Nicolas d'Angers
- Feast: 24 April
- Influences: John Eudes
- Influenced: Mary of the Divine Heart

Mary Euphrasia Pelletier, RGS, religious name Mary of Saint Euphrasia, born as Rose Virginie Pelletier (31 July 1796 in Noirmoutier-en-l'Île – 24 April 1868 in Angers), was a French religious sister. She founded the Sisters of the Good Shepherd and was its first superior general.

During her time as superior in Tours founded also a community, the "Magdalens", for women who wanted to lead a contemplative life in the enclosure and would support, by their ministry of prayer, the different works of the apostolic congregation. They are now known as the Contemplatives of the Good Shepherd.

Pope Pius XII canonised Mary Euphrasia Pelletier in 1940. Her feast day is 24 April.

== Biography ==
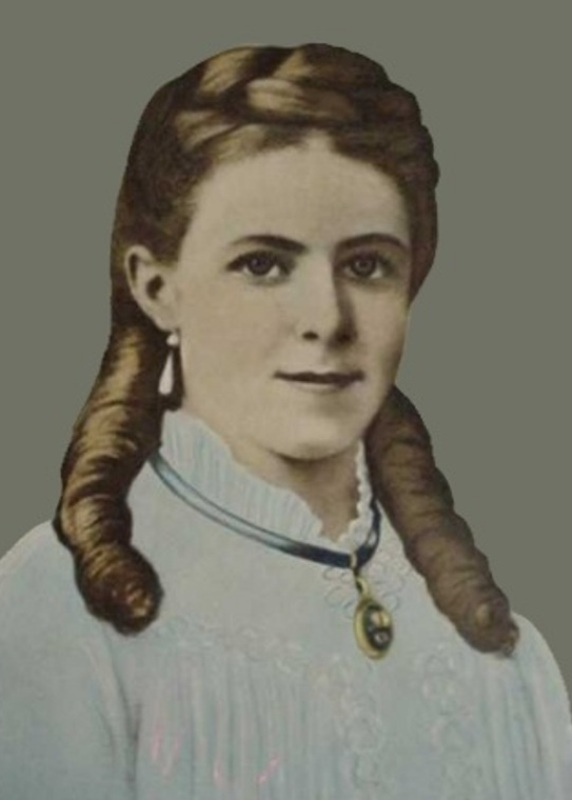
Rose Virginie Pelletier in her youth

Pelletier was born on 31 July 1796 on Noirmoutier a small island off the northwest coast of France. Her parents had fled there thinking that they could escape the violence of the French Revolution. She was the 8th child of Julian and Anne Pelletier. Her father died when she was ten years old. In 1810 her mother placed Pelletier in a boarding school in Tours. Her mother died in 1813.

Near the boarding school was a convent of the Order of Our Lady of Charity of the Refuge, a religious congregation founded by John Eudes to provide care and protection for women and girls who were homeless and at risk of exploitation. Some of the girls were abandoned by their families or orphaned, some had turned to prostitution in order to survive. The Sisters of Our Lady of Charity provided shelter, food, vocational training and an opportunity for these girls and women to turn their lives around.

Despite her guardian's reservations Pelletier joined the sisters on 20 October 1814. On 6 September 1815 she received the habit and the religious name Mary of Saint Euphrasia. Due to her age, Pelletier wasn't allowed not make her vows before she turned 21. She eventually made them in 1817 and worked as a teacher.

The sisters of the convent had been dispersed at one point during the revolution; the majority had been imprisoned. Pelletier joined what was a community of elderly weary sisters. As early as 1825, the 29-year-old Pelletier was elected by the convent to the superior, although she had not yet reached the necessary age required by the constitutions and needed a dispensation to exercise the office.

== Foundation of the Sisters of the Good Shepherd ==
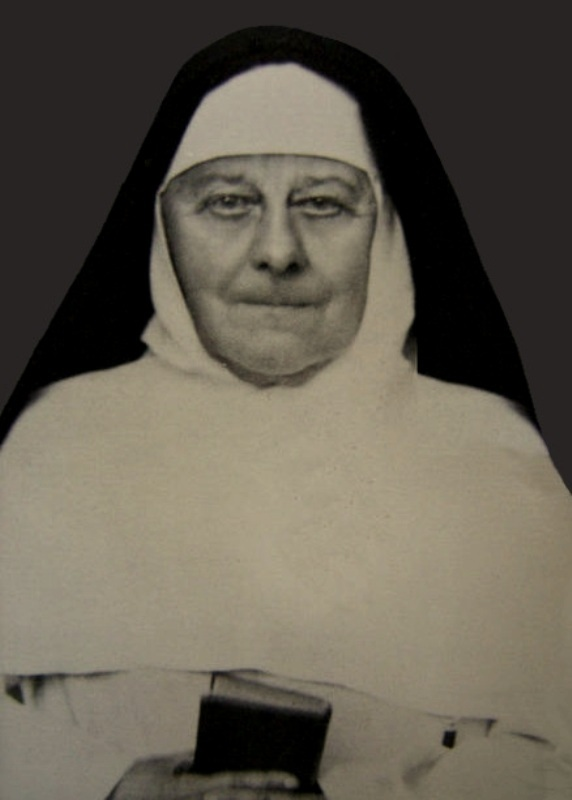
Mary Euphrasia Pelletier in 1860

In 1828, the Bishop of Angers received a legacy of 30,000 francs, with which a refuge for women in need was to be founded. He gave the task to Pelletier, who traveled to Angers in 1829 and set up the convent in a former cotton factory on July 31, 1829. She placed it under the patronage of the Bon Pasteur ("Good Shepherd").

After the appointment of Sister Paul Bodin as a superior, Pelletier returned to Tours. However, she was recalled to Angers, due to the fact that Bodin was not up to the task. In 1831, Pelletier was appointed as Mother superior of the convent in Angers.

The convent in Tours did not wish to expand to Angers, nor did the convent in Nantes. Eudes had established his houses as separate and autonomous. Pelletier came to believe that if the work was to grow, that each house should be under the direction of a generalate. She founded additional convents in Le Mans, Poitiers, Grenoble and Metz.

In April 1835, Pope Gregory XVI granted approval of the motherhouse at Angers for the Congregation of Our Lady of Charity of the Good Shepherd of Angers. Convents that developed for Angers would be part of the institute while those houses that did not attach themselves to the General Administration would remain refuges. The development of the generalate made possible the sending of the sisters to wherever they were needed. Convents were also established in Italy, Belgium, Germany, and England. The institute is directly subject to the Holy See; Cardinal Odescalchi was its first cardinal-protector.

For some time, Pelletier had to deal with the opposition of Bishop Angebault of Angers, who wished to exercise the authority of the superior general, although the congregation's constitutions did not provide for this. Pelletier was accused of ambition, of innovation, and of disobedience. Sometimes she was put in the position of addressing conflicting instructions from Rome and the bishop. Although she had the support of Rome, the local clergy tended to keep their distance from someone who had incurred the bishop's displeasure. According to Norma O'Shea, RGS, the bishop's opposition, coupled with the deaths of a number of sisters and longtime supporters, made Pelletier's last years very lonely.

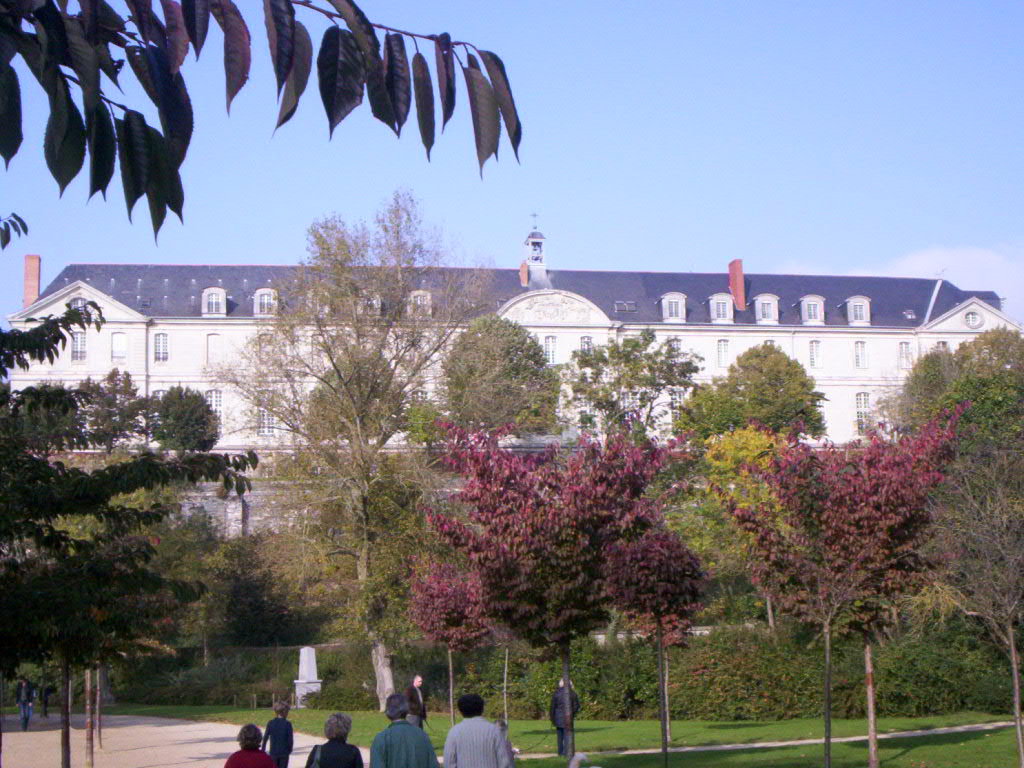
The Abbey of Saint Nicholas in Angers is part of the motherhouse of the Congregation of Our Lady of Charity of the Good Shepherd

Pelletier devoted herself to the work entrusted to her. By 1868, she was superior general of 3,000 sisters in 110 convents in thirty-five countries. She died of cancer on 24 April 1868. She is buried on the property of the Motherhouse of the Sisters of the Good Shepherd in Angers, France.

== Beatification process ==
On 11 December 1897, Pope Leo XIII declared Mary Euphrasia Pelletier venerable. She was beatified on 30 April 1933 and canonised on 2 May 1940 by Pope Pius XII.

== Legacy ==
Approximately 5500 Sisters of the Good Shepherd, active and contemplative, serve in 72 countries.
