= A-level =

British educational certification

Advanced Level (A-level)
- An old GCE Advanced Level logo historically used by Cambridge International Education
- Acronym: A-level; A level
- Type: General Certificate of Education
- Year started: 1951
- Duration: 2 years
- Languages: English language, Welsh language, Irish language
- Prerequisites: Typically General Certificate of Secondary Education

The A-level (Advanced Level) is a subject-based qualification conferred as part of the General Certificate of Education, as well as a school leaving qualification offered by the educational bodies in the United Kingdom and the educational authorities of British Crown dependencies to students completing secondary or pre-university education. They were introduced in England, Wales and Northern Ireland in 1951 to replace the Higher School Certificate. The A-level permits students to have potential access to a chosen university they applied to with UCAS points. They could be accepted into it should they meet the requirements of the university.

A number of Commonwealth countries have developed qualifications with the same name as and a similar format to the British A-levels. Obtaining an A-level, or equivalent qualifications, is generally required across the board for university entrance, with universities granting offers based on grades achieved.

A-levels are typically worked towards over two years. Normally, students take three or four A-level courses in their first year of sixth form, and most taking four cut back to three in their second year. This is because university offers are normally based on three A-level grades, and taking a fourth can have an impact on grades. Unlike other level-3 qualifications, such as the International Baccalaureate, A-levels have no specific subject requirements, so students have the opportunity to combine any subjects they wish to take. However, students normally pick their courses based on the degree they wish to pursue at university: most degrees require specific A-levels for entry.

In Wales, Northern Ireland, or for legacy modular courses (last assessment Summer 2019) in England, A-levels are split into two parts, with students within their first year of study pursuing an Advanced Subsidiary qualification, commonly referred to as an AS or AS-level, which can either serve as an independent qualification or contribute 40% of the marks towards a full A-level award. The second part is known as an A2 or A2-level, which is generally more in-depth and academically rigorous than the AS. The AS and A2 marks are combined for a full A-level award. The A2-level is not a qualification on its own and must be accompanied by an AS-level in the same subject for certification.

A-level exams are a matriculation examination and can be compared to matura, the Abitur, the Baccalauréat or the Bagrut certificate.

== Current usage ==
Several countries use A-levels as a school-leaving qualification. However, A levels are mainly taken in the UK. The A-levels taken by students in other countries may differ from the A-levels taken in the United Kingdom.

=== International usage ===
Many schools in countries world-wide offer A-Levels through international cross-border exam boards, which include Cambridge International Education (CIE), Pearson Edexcel, Learning Resource Network (LRN) and OxfordAQA.

=== United Kingdom ===
A-levels are a college or sixth form leaving qualification offered in England, Wales, and Northern Ireland. These are not compulsory, unlike GCSEs. In Scotland, A-levels are also offered by some schools as an alternative school-leaving qualification in place of the Scottish Advanced Higher. The main examination boards which administer British A-levels in the UK are:

- Assessment and Qualifications Alliance (AQA)
- Oxford, Cambridge, and RSA Examinations (OCR)
- Edexcel (Edexcel Pearson – London Examinations)
- Welsh Joint Education Committee (WJEC)
- Council for the Curriculum, Examinations & Assessment (CCEA/NICCEA)
- Cambridge International Education (CIE)
- Learning Resource Network (LRN)

Oxford AQA, Edexcel, Cambridge International Education (CIE), and Learning Resource Network (LRN) also offer international versions of the British A-levels in the United Kingdom and worldwide.

The British variant of A/AS-levels is also taken in many Commonwealth and former Commonwealth countries, as well as in examination centers worldwide. British international schools in foreign countries generally offer the British A-levels as offered through Edexcel or Cambridge International Examinations. At select examination centers, the British A-level exams may also be available to private candidates.

=== Bangladesh ===
In Bangladesh, the GCE AS and A-level are offered by Cambridge International Education (CIE) and Pearson Edexcel after completion of IGCSE (CIE or Pearson Edexcel) or Cambridge O-Level, and is conducted by the British Council. GCE Advanced Level qualifications are offered by some of the private, public, and international schools as an alternative to HSC (Higher Secondary School Certificate) offered by the Government Board of Education. It has become a popular choice among students, but due to financial implications, its reach is limited to the middle and upper classes in major cities such as Dhaka and Chittagong.

=== Brunei ===
In Brunei, the A-level qualification is offered, with examinations conducted by Cambridge International Education (CIE). Some subjects are unique to Brunei or have a format, curriculum, or syllabus that is unique to Brunei.

=== Cameroon ===
The Advanced Level of Cameroon is based on the Cambridge International Education and similarly, conducted by the government of Cameroon in collaboration with Cambridge University. All the courses taken are related to what the candidate is willing to pursue a career in university and these courses are on a recognizable international standard for university entrance; as they are major relevant courses.

=== Hong Kong ===
The British A-level qualifications such as GCE A-level and International A-level are widely accepted in Hong Kong as an alternative to the Hong Kong Diploma of Secondary Education for both admission and employment purposes. It is one of the most popular qualifications used for university admission via the non-JUPAS channel. For example, average non-JUPAS offers from the Hong Kong University of Science and Technology require one to three A*s (the mid-50% range). Since the introduction of the high distinction grade (A*) in 2010, the British A-level examination has regained its power to differentiate the very top levels of ability. According to the British Department for Education, in the academic year 2014/15, approximately 7.3%, 2.7%, 1.0%, and 0.3% of all the candidates from the GCSE cohort (548,480) achieved one to four A*s or a better result in the GCE A-level examination. This percentile rank is one important input for equating the levels in both examinations. On the sole basis of percentile ranks and the grade statistics from HKEAA in 2017, a score of 29/35 from the best five subjects in Hong Kong Diploma of Secondary Education is comparable to 1A*2A in the best three British A-levels, 32/35 to 2A*1A, 33/35 to 3A* and 34/35 to 4A*. In deriving inferences from these statistics, slightly more than a third of the GCSE candidates can go on to study in the sixth form before applying to universities via the Universities and Colleges Admissions Service (UCAS) while almost all Hong Kong students can study Form 6 before sitting the HKDSE examination.

Relevant authorities such as the Hong Kong Examination and Assessment Authority (HKEAA) and UCAS also sought to connect the results from both exam systems to open doors for the holders of these qualifications who wish to study locally or overseas. Officially, the top distinction levels, A* in A-level and 5** in HKDSE, are currently recognized as broadly equivalent. In particular, in the light of statistical evidence, the 1% cut-off line is often set by admission offices at 2A*1A as compared to a score of 43/45 in the International Baccalaureate Diploma but the Uniform Mark Scale (UMS) instead of the letter grades would be used in many cases to offer a much more subtle view of the candidate's academic potential. Typical offers from Cambridge Medical School require 2A*1A and Oxford University Medical School require 1A*2A whereas those from the medical and dentistry schools of the University of Hong Kong and the Chinese University of Hong Kong require 4A* and 3A* respectively in A-level due to fierce competition.

=== India ===
In India, Cambridge International Education (CIE), and Learning Resource Network (LRN) GCE Advanced Level qualifications are offered at private and international schools as an alternative to the conventional Higher Secondary Certificate (HSC).

=== Macau ===
The International A-Level qualifications are offered in some private schools and international schools which teaching medium is English and adopt IAL curriculum. Students in Macau can take the Cambridge International Education (CIE) or Edexcel International A-Level offered at their school. It is one of the most popular qualifications for the students who want to pursue their university study in UK, Hong Kong, Australia, and New Zealand. International Advanced Level qualification is also accepted by Macau local universities for applying for direct admission, the applicants with IAL qualification are not required to take the Joint Admission Examination for Macao Four Higher Education Institutions.

=== Malaysia ===
In Malaysia, the A-level qualification is offered, with examinations conducted by Cambridge International Education (CIE) and Learning Resource Network. Some subjects are unique to Malaysia or have a format, curriculum, or syllabus that is unique to Malaysia. For instance, there are two types of A-level in Malaysia, Cambridge A-level (administered by Cambridge International Examinations) and Edexcel International Advanced Level (administered by Pearson Edexcel).

=== Mauritius ===
In Mauritius, A/AS-level qualifications are taken as part of the Higher School Certificate, awarded upon successful completion of secondary school after passing of examinations jointly administered by the Mauritius Examinations Syndicate and the University of Cambridge Local Examinations Syndicate (UCLES). Some exam papers offered, such as French, are customized to support the national educational standards. Additionally, International A-level qualifications from Edexcel are available, for which exams may be registered through the Mauritius Examinations Syndicate.

=== Nepal ===
In Nepal, A-level offered from Cambridge International Education (CIE) is the most popular and is presented by several public, private, and international institutions as an alternative to the National Examination Board's 10+2 curriculum. A-level has become a popular choice for many students in Nepal. Besides A-level, International Baccalaureate and Advanced Placement are also offered at this level. Nepali students generally appear for 4 subjects at A-level and 5 at AS-level.

=== Pakistan ===
A-levels are offered in Pakistan by governmental and private institutions, along with International Baccalaureate and other international examinations like the Advanced Placement though A levels is by far the most popular. Examinations are handled by international British boards and the program is equivalent to Higher Secondary School Certificate. Cram Schools are established all around the country which prepares the students to take the examinations as private candidates.

=== Seychelles ===
In Seychelles, the A-level qualification is offered, with examinations conducted by Cambridge International Education (CIE). Some subjects are unique to Seychelles or have a format, curriculum, or syllabus that is unique to Seychelles.

=== Singapore ===
In Singapore, H1/H2/H3 level qualifications are awarded upon successful completion of examinations jointly administered by Singapore Ministry of Education (MOE), Singapore Examinations and Assessment Board (SEAB) and Cambridge International Education (CIE).

=== Sri Lanka ===
In Sri Lanka, A-level qualifications are offered by governmental and non-governmental schools (Private Schools). The qualifications are awarded upon successful completion of examinations called Local A-levels while most of the private schools award them upon London A-levels. Local GCE Advanced Level qualifications are offered by the Department of Examinations. Private Schools (International Schools) in Sri Lanka provide A-level qualifications which are offered by:

- Cambridge International Education (CIE)
- Edexcel

Passing A-levels is a major requirement for applying to local universities and for private universities in Sri Lanka. In the recent past, Universities in Sri Lanka have given the opportunity to apply for their foundation courses which only require O-level (Ordinary Level) results.

=== Tanzania ===
A-level is an education structure after the completion of 11 years of Universal Primary Education (UPE). Universal Primary Education consists of two levels, the primary school level of seven years and ordinarily secondary level, of four years.

Students are then required to sit for the National Examination which is done on a specific month in a certain year. The exams are done throughout the country on the same date provided by the examination board. Examinations will depend on the cluster and core subjects in which a student shall take. There are three major clusters, namely science, business, and liberal arts plus core subjects of which are seven in total or more. Students who will then pass according to the National Examination Standards shall be selected to join Advanced Secondary Education and are selected according to the subjects they passed the most and by their will to pursue certain subjects.

There are only three core subjects to study in Advanced Level and one or more optional subjects to sit for the Advanced Certificate of Secondary Education Examination (ACSEE). Then students are awarded Advanced Certificate of Secondary Education only if they have passed. The pass marks are arranged according to grades and the grades will determine whether a student will qualify to join tertiary education.

A-level education is a two years education which is offered by the government and non-government schools. It is regulated by the Ministry of Education which assures both qualitative and quantitative subject matters and there is a special independent council that is responsible in composing the Advanced Certificate of Secondary Education Examination (ACSEE) namely The National Examination Council of Tanzania (NECTA).

=== Uganda ===
In Uganda, a Uganda Advanced Certificate of Education is awarded to students who have passed their national examinations that are set and marked by the Uganda National Examination Board (UNEB). It is among the requirements for one to join a university in Uganda. The advanced level takes two years for one to complete. Some international schools in Uganda also offer A-level courses from Cambridge and Edexcel.

=== Zimbabwe ===
The GCE Advanced Level qualification is offered by the Zimbabwe School Examinations Council (ZIMSEC). Before, this qualification was jointly offered by Cambridge International Education and the Council in Zimbabwe.

== Subjects offered at A level ==
A wide variety of subjects are offered at A-level by different examination boards. However, not all exam boards offer all of these subjects. They often alter their curricula, hence this table shows the majority of subjects that are consistently available for study.

- Accounting
- Afrikaans
- Ancient History
- Art and Design
- Applied Science
- Arabic
- Archaeology
- Architecture
- Bengali
- Biblical Hebrew
- Biology
- Business
- Business Studies
- Chemistry
- Chinese
- Classical Civilisation
- Classical Greek
- Classical Studies
- Communication and Culture
- Computer Science
- Criminology
- Dance
- Design and Technology
- Design and Textiles
- Digital Media and Design
- Digital Technology
- Divinity
- Drama
- Drama and Theatre
- Dutch
- Economics
- Economics and Business
- Electronics
- Engineering
- English Language
- English Language and Literature
- English Literature
- Environmental Science
- Environmental Technology
- Fashion and Textiles
- Film Studies
- Food Technology
- Food Preparation and Nutrition
- French
- Further Mathematics
- Geography
- Geology
- German
- Global Development
- Global Perspectives and Research
- Government and Politics
- Greek
- Gujarati
- Health and Social Care
- Hindi
- Hinduism
- History
- History of Art
- Home Economics
- Human Biology
- Humanities
- IT
- Information Technology
- International Relations
- Irish
- Islamic studies
- Italian
- Japanese
- Journalism in the Media and Communications Industry
- Latin
- Law
- Leisure Studies
- Life and Health Sciences
- Marine Science
- Mathematics
- Media Studies
- Modern Hebrew
- Moving Image Arts
- Music
- Music Technology
- Nutrition and Food Science
- Punjabi
- Performance Studies
- Performing Arts
- Persian
- Philosophy
- Photography
- Physical Education
- Physical Science
- Physics
- Polish
- Politics
- Portuguese
- Product Design
- Professional Business Services
- Psychology
- Pure Mathematics
- Quantitative Methods
- Religious Studies
- Science in Society
- Russian
- Sinhala
- Sociology
- Software Systems Development
- Spanish
- Sports Science and the Active Leisure Industry
- Statistics
- Systems and Control Technology
- Tamil
- Technology and Design
- Thinking Skills
- Travel and Tourism
- Turkish
- Urdu
- Welsh

== A-level reforms in England ==
Between 2015 and 2018 (first assessment Summer 2017), A-levels in England were reformed, transitioning from a modular to linear structure (initially across 13 subjects). This means all A-level exams are taken in one sitting as a set of terminal exams (three exams for the majority of subjects), and there is no coursework set for many subjects. For A-levels that retain a coursework element, the percentage of the final grade determined by coursework has been reduced. An example of this can be seen in Edexcel's new English Literature A-level, reformed in 2015, which reduces the amount of coursework to 20% (from 40% in the old modular specification). A-levels are no longer separated into units, and students must resit all of their exams if they wish to resit the qualification. While these reforms were expected to be complete for first teaching in 2017, this was extended to 2018 to include the reforms of less common languages such as Modern Hebrew and Bengali.

The AS-level is now a separate qualification and is not required for an A-level award, although it still encompasses the first year of the full A-level content. However, unlike AS-levels in the old modular courses, they are now worth only 40% as many UCAS points as a full A-level (from 50% in the modular courses), as content from the second year of A-level is considered more academically challenging than that of the first year.

As these reforms took place in stages, many students took a combination of modular and linear courses before all reforms were complete, with AS-levels still being part of an A-level in older modular courses.

These reforms look to combat grade inflation, where the proportion of students achieving the highest grades increases year upon year, causing the value of those grades to be eroded. The modular system has also been criticised for nurturing a 'resit culture', while new linear courses give no opportunity to resit individual units.

Controversially, some A-level course subjects have been abolished since 2017 as part of these reforms. These include archaeology, anthropology, creative writing, critical thinking, general studies, and home economics. Many universities criticized the scrapping of exams taken at the end of AS-level, which used to be worth 50% of the overall A-level grade. This is because the universities used the grades achieved at AS-level (available to universities after a student applies during the second year of A-levels) as an indication of a student's ability and thus whether to give said student an offer.

Opposition to these reforms in Wales and Northern Ireland has resulted in maintaining the modular structure of their qualification.

In September 2023, it was announced by Prime Minister Rishi Sunak that the A-level would be scrapped in England and merged with T-levels to form the Advanced British Standard, however this was cancelled by the Labour government after their victory in the 2024 general election.

== Former usage ==
=== Caribbean ===
In 2002, schools in the Caribbean began to move away from the GCE Advanced Level to the CXC CAPE examinations, making them a de facto university entrance examination. Some universities also require applicants to take separate entrance examinations. The International Baccalaureate and European Baccalaureate are also accepted.

== See also ==
- Advanced British Standard, a proposed (now scrapped) replacement
- General Certificate of Secondary Education (GCSE) – an entry qualification
- GCE Ordinary Level (O-Level) – an entry qualification that has been phased out in the United Kingdom
- Further / special
  - Scholarship level (S-level) – last offered in 2001
  - Advanced Extension Award (AEA) – 2002–2009, 2015 mathematics
  - Sixth Term Examination Paper (STEP) – used by the University of Cambridge and the University of Warwick for admissions to study mathematics at undergraduate level
- International A-levels
  - Singapore-Cambridge GCE Advanced Level – harder examination in Singapore
  - Hong Kong Advanced Level Examination (HKALE) – now defunct
  - GCE Advanced Level in Sri Lanka
- Scotland
  - Higher (Scottish) – Scottish university entrance qualification
  - Advanced Higher (Scottish) – Scottish equivalent to A-level
- Canada
  - Ontario Academic Credit
- Vocational
  - BTEC Extended Diploma – the highest level of the BTEC structure and is taken by people aged 16 or above (equal to A-levels)
  - T Level (level 3)
  - NVQ (level 3)
  - Advanced Vocational Certificate of Education (AVCE)
- Europe
  - Abitur – similar qualification in Germany and Finland
  - Eindexamen – similar qualification in the Netherlands
  - Matura or Maturità – similar qualification in some European countries
- Baccalaureate
  - Baccalauréat – similar qualification in France
  - European Baccalaureate – examination used mainly in the European School system
  - IB Diploma Programme – alternative examination found across the world
- International alternatives
  - Advanced Placement Program – similar qualification in the United States
  - Bagrut – similar qualification in Israel
  - Leaving Certificate (Ireland)
  - Sijil Tinggi Persekolahan Malaysia (Malaysian Higher School Certificate) – better known as "STPM", an equivalent examination in Malaysia
  - Matriculation Certificate (Malta)
  - Senior Secondary Certificate of Education (Australia)
