= Premiership of Rishi Sunak =

Period of the Government of the United Kingdom from 2022 to 2024

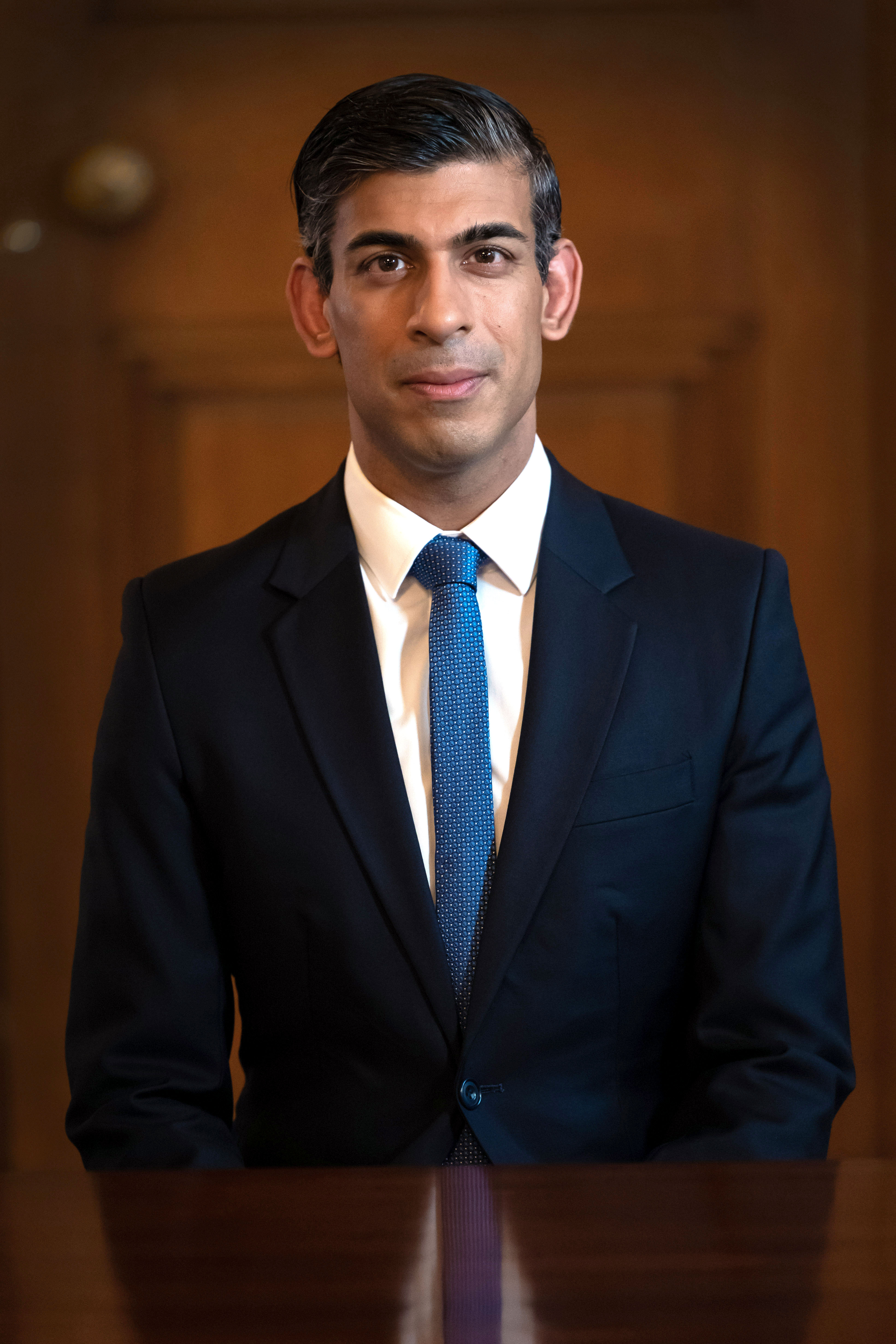
- Official portrait, 2022
- Premiership of Rishi Sunak; 25 October 2022 – 5 July 2024
- Monarch: Charles III
- Cabinet: Sunak ministry
- Party: Conservative
- Seat: 10 Downing Street
- Coat of Arms of His Majesty's Government

Rishi Sunak's tenure as Prime Minister of the United Kingdom began on 25 October 2022 when he accepted an invitation from King Charles III to form a government, succeeding Liz Truss, and ended on 5 July 2024 upon his resignation. He is the first British Asian and the first Hindu to hold the office. Sunak's premiership was dominated by the Russian invasion of Ukraine, the Gaza war, the cost-of-living crisis, and the Rwanda asylum plan. As prime minister, Sunak also served simultaneously as First Lord of the Treasury, Minister for the Civil Service, Minister for the Union, and Leader of the Conservative Party.

Sunak stood in the July–September 2022 Conservative Party leadership election to succeed Boris Johnson, who resigned amidst a government crisis. He received the most votes in each of the parliamentary ballots, but lost the members' vote to the foreign secretary, Liz Truss. After spending the duration of her premiership as a backbencher, he was elected unopposed in the October party leadership election to succeed her, Truss having resigned in another government crisis; at 42 he was the youngest prime minister since Robert Jenkinson, 2nd Earl of Liverpool in 1812.

Sunak took office amidst the cost-of-living and energy-supply crises that began during his tenure as Chancellor of the Exchequer, as well as during industrial disputes and strikes. In 2023, Sunak outlined five key priorities: halving inflation, growing the economy, cutting debt, reducing NHS waiting lists, and stopping the illegal small-boat crossings of the English Channel (by enacting the Rwanda asylum plan). Sunak negotiated a proposed agreement with the European Union (EU) on Northern Ireland's trading arrangements which was published as the Windsor Framework.

On foreign policy, Sunak authorised foreign aid and weapons shipments to Ukraine in response to the Russian invasion of the country, and after the October 7 attacks which began the Gaza war, Sunak pledged the UK's support for Israel and declared that Israel "has an absolute right to defend itself", but later condemned the high number of civilian casualties during the Israeli bombardment of the Gaza Strip and called for a sustainable ceasefire.

During his premiership, Sunak attempted to improve the economy and stabilise national politics, although many of his pledges and policy announcements ultimately went unfulfilled. He did not avert further unpopularity for the Conservatives, which was reflected in the party's poor performances in the 2023 and 2024 local elections. Sunak called a general election for July 2024 whilst being widely expected to call the election in the autumn; the Conservatives lost this election in a landslide to the opposition Labour Party led by Keir Starmer, ending 14 years of Conservative government. After Starmer succeeded Sunak as prime minister, Sunak became Leader of the Opposition and remained Conservative leader whilst the leadership election to replace him took place, forming a shadow cabinet.

== Conservative leadership bids ==
=== July–September 2022 ===
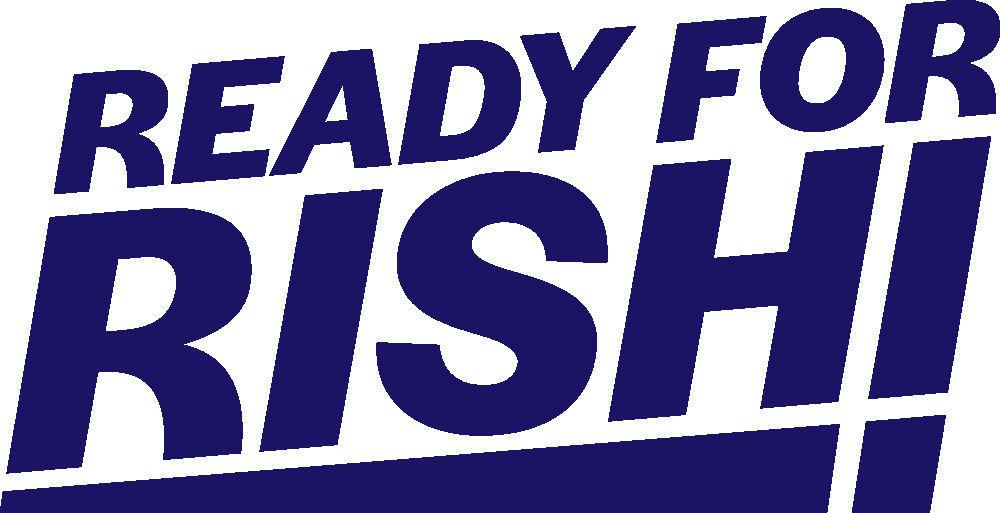
Campaign logo

Sunak stood in the July–September 2022 Conservative Party leadership election to replace Boris Johnson, after his resignation amid a government crisis. Sunak launched his campaign in a video posted to social media, writing that he would "restore trust, rebuild the economy and reunite the country". He said that his values were "patriotism, fairness, hard work", and pledged to "crack down on gender neutral language". During the campaign, Sunak's pledges included tax cuts only when inflation was under control, scrapping of the 5% VAT rate on household energy for one year, introducing a temporary £10 fine for patients who fail to attend GP appointments, capping of refugee numbers, and a tightening of the definition of asylum. Sunak and Foreign Secretary Liz Truss emerged as the final two candidates in the contest on 20 July to be put forward to the membership for the final leadership vote; he had received the most votes in each of the series of MP votes with Sunak receiving 137 to Truss' 113 in the final round. In the membership vote, Truss received 57.4% of the vote, making her the new leader over Sunak. He spent the duration of Truss' premiership on the backbenches.

=== October 2022 ===
Following the resignation of Truss after another government crisis, Sunak stood in the October 2022 Conservative Party leadership election and formally launched his bid to become Leader of the Conservative Party on 23 October 2022. Sunak was backed by several cabinet members and prominent party members, such as Lord Frost, Kemi Badenoch, Nadhim Zahawi, Matt Hancock, Sajid Javid, Jeremy Hunt, Tom Tugendhat, James Cleverly, Ben Wallace, Priti Patel, Iain Duncan Smith, Michael Gove, and Dominic Raab.

Following a change of rules by the 1922 Committee, each potential leader needed the support of at least 100 MPs to be a candidate in the vote, with a deadline of 2 pm on 24 October to secure enough nominations. On 22 October, it was reported that Sunak had the required number of supporters—100 members of the House of Commons—to run in the ballot on 24 October. The total number of MPs who publicly declared support passed 100 on the afternoon of 22 October. On 23 October, Sunak declared he would stand in the contest.

There were two other candidates actively seeking nominations: Boris Johnson and Penny Mordaunt. However, Johnson announced that evening that he would not declare his candidacy, stating that he would not have enough support from MPs to govern effectively, and Mordaunt withdrew her candidacy on 24 October after being unable to get the nominations of 100 MPs by the deadline. It was subsequently announced by Sir Graham Brady that as the sole candidate who had received the required 100 nominations, Sunak had been elected as the new party leader.

Sunak made a short statement after his appointment as Conservative leader, saying "I am humbled and honoured to have the support of my parliamentary colleagues and to be elected as leader of the Conservative and Unionist Party. It is the greatest privilege of my life to be able to serve the party I love and give back to the country I owe so much to."

== Premiership ==
=== Appointment as Prime Minister ===
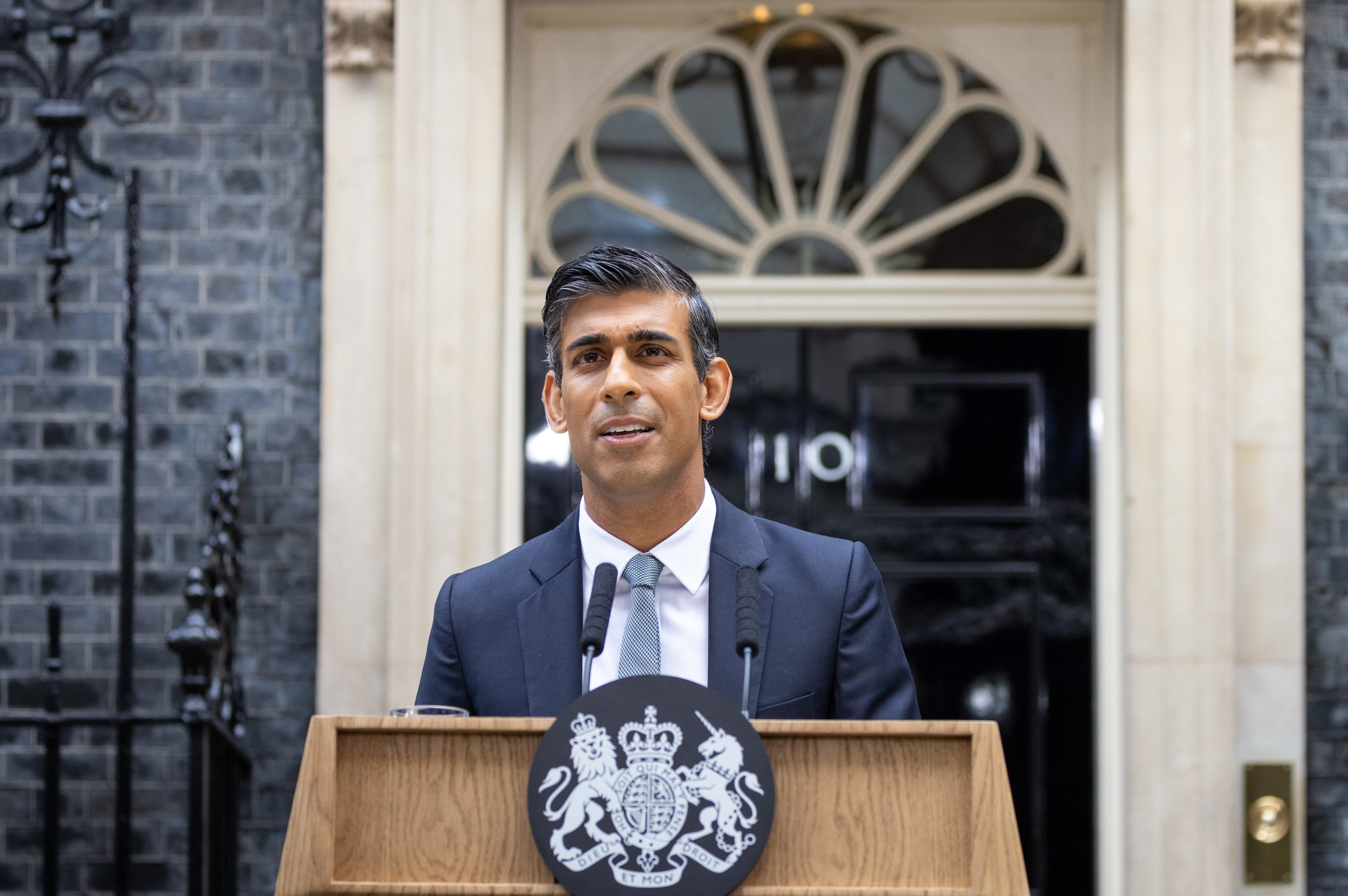
Sunak giving his first speech as prime minister at 10 Downing Street, 25 October 2022

Sunak was appointed Prime Minister of the United Kingdom by King Charles III on 25 October 2022, making him the first British Asian (Note: While Sunak was the first prime minister of British Asian ethnicity, several prime ministers have been noted to have Asian ancestry. Benjamin Disraeli came from a diverse European Jewish background, a community with historic roots in Asia. Boris Johnson's great-grandfather Ali Kemal Bey was Turkish. Lord Liverpool's great-grandmother Isabella Beizor was of partial Indian heritage.) prime minister and the first Hindu to hold the office. In his first speech as prime minister, Sunak promised "integrity, professionalism and accountability," and said that "we will create a future worthy of the sacrifices so many have made and fill tomorrow, and everyday thereafter with hope." Of his predecessor, Sunak said that Truss "was not wrong" to want to improve growth and that he "admired her restlessness to create change", but admitted that "some mistakes were made", and that he was elected prime minister in part to fix them. He promised to "place economic stability and confidence at the heart of this government's agenda":

I will place economic stability and confidence at the heart of this government's agenda. I will unite our country, not with words, but with action. I will work day in and day out to deliver for you. This government will have integrity, professionalism and accountability at every level. Trust is earned. And I will earn yours.

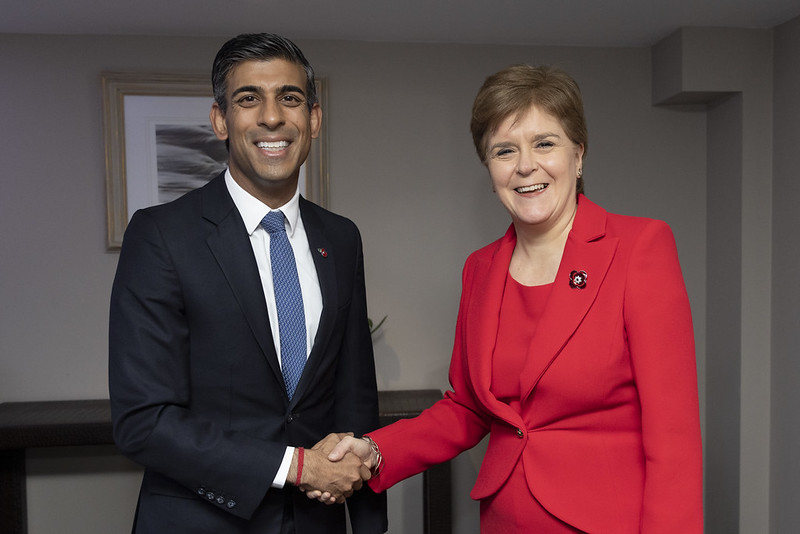
Sunak meets with the then-First Minister of Scotland, Nicola Sturgeon, in Blackpool for the British–Irish Council summit, November 2022

On 26 October, Sunak answered his first Prime Minister's Questions (PMQs). The same day Sunak also held his first cabinet meeting.

=== Domestic affairs ===
In January 2023, Sunak outlined five key priorities; halving inflation, growing the economy, cutting debt, reducing NHS waiting lists, and stopping the boats, and expected voters to hold his government and himself to account on delivering those goals.

==== Climate change ====
In a reversal of his predecessor's policy, Sunak reinstated the ban on fracking on 26 October 2022 as outlined in the 2019 Conservative manifesto.

In December 2022, Sunak was faced with the need to make concessions on a proposed ban on onshore wind farms to be contained in the government's Levelling Up and Regeneration Bill. A number of Conservative MPs, including Johnson and Truss, said they would back a rebel amendment to the bill that would remove the ban. At the same time, there was the threat of another rebellion and need to make concessions related to housebuilding targets.

In December 2022, Sunak said it was "completely unacceptable" that ordinary people were having their lives disrupted by environmental protests. He stated that police commanders had his full support "to suppress any unlawful protest". He also promised to bring in new laws to tackle illegal immigration, saying anyone who comes to the UK illegally will not be allowed to stay.

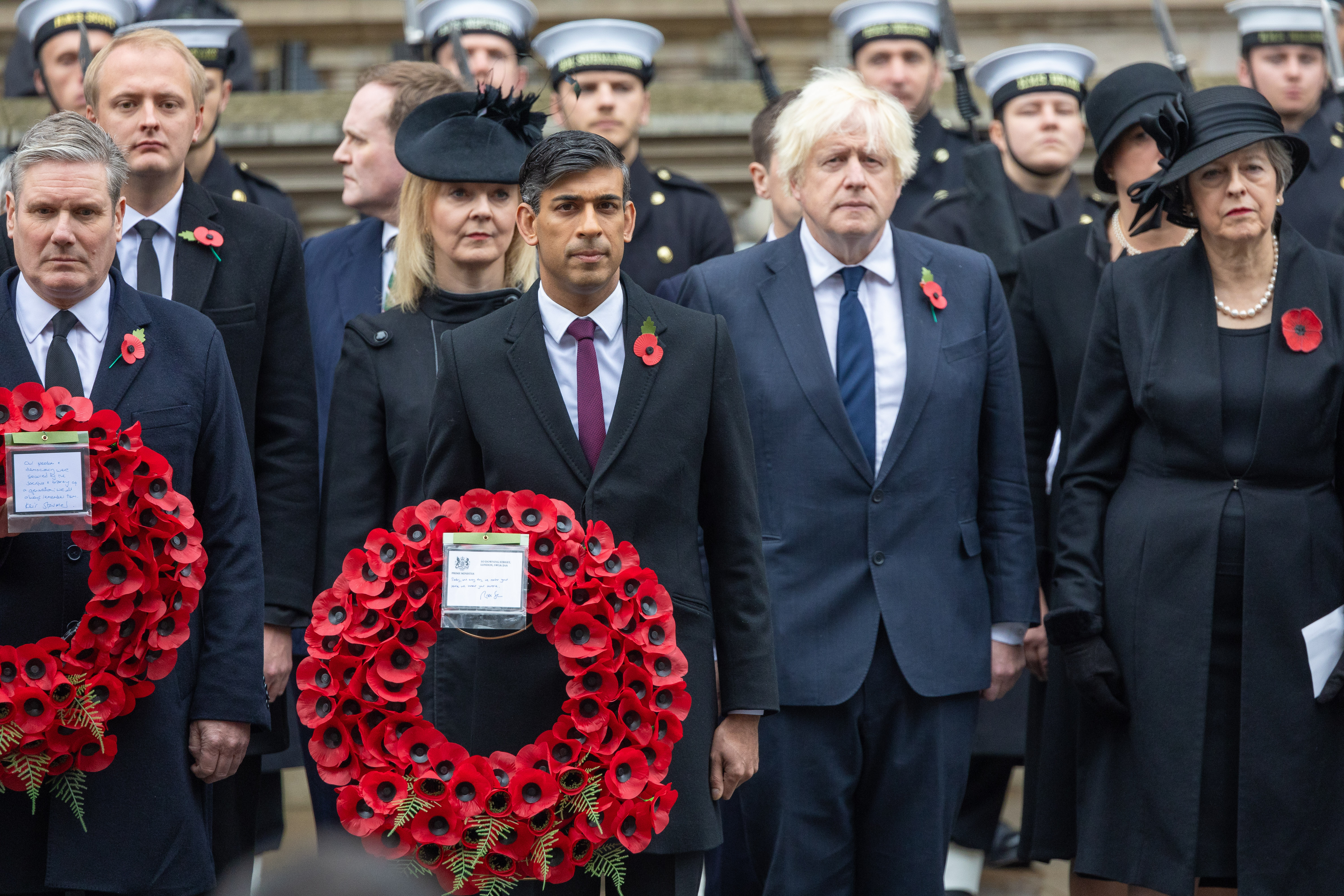
Sunak with Theresa May, Boris Johnson, Liz Truss, and Keir Starmer in November 2023

On 20 September 2023, Sunak announced a major rethink of the UK government's strategy to achieve net zero carbon output in the UK by 2050, including postponing banning the sale of new petrol and diesel cars from 2030 to 2035. He justified the changes to the government's net zero strategy by saying that the UK government should not impose "unacceptable costs" of net zero policies on working families. However, these changes were met with criticism from the opposition and business leaders.

In his speech at the 2023 Conservative Party Conference, which took place in Manchester in October, Sunak announced the cancellation of the northern leg (between Birmingham and Manchester) and the remainder of the eastern leg (to East Midlands Parkway) of the planned High Speed 2 (HS2) railway line. Instead, Sunak announced a reallocation of funds for transport projects in the North of England. The announcement was met with criticism from former prime minister David Cameron who said the cancellation would "make it much harder to build consensus for any future long-term projects".

===== Climate change conferences =====
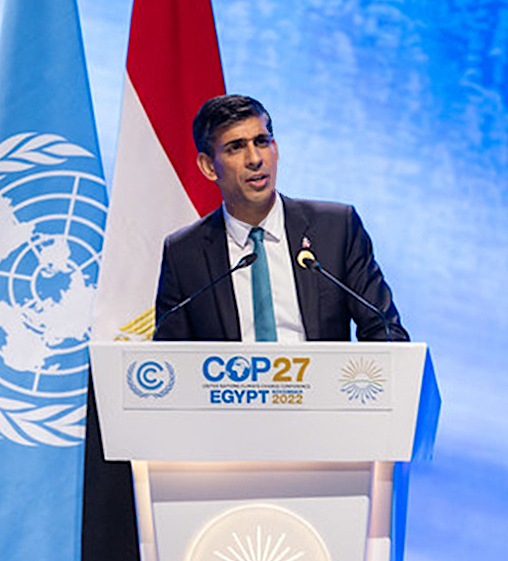
Sunak delivering a speech at COP27 in Egypt

On 27 October 2022, Sunak announced he would not attend the COP27 climate summit in Egypt "due to other pressing domestic commitments". On 2 November, following pressure from MPs, environmentalist campaigners and others, Sunak announced that he would attend. Sunak attended a reception held by King Charles at Buckingham Palace on 4 November. Sunak told the meeting of approximately 200 politicians and campaigners that the UK will continue with its environmental aims after the end of its COP 26 presidency. In his speech Sunak warned that as climate change ravages the planet there will be more human suffering and that because of inaction, people risk giving their children a desperate inheritance. Sunak also paid tribute to King Charles' longstanding work for the environment.

On 7 November at the COP 27 summit, Sunak launched The Forest and Climate Leaders' Partnership (FCLP), building on a policy called the Glasgow Climate Pact, originally started at COP 26. The partnership aims to halt and reverse deforestation by 2030, bringing 26 countries and the European Union together. These countries account for 60% of global GDP and over 33% of the world's forests and together with private funding, the partnership has total funds of $23.8bn. Sunak said in his speech to the Forest and Climate Leaders' Summit that the world's forests have been undervalued and underestimated, yet were one of the natural wonders of the world. He then asked attendees to build upon what had already been achieved to secure an incredible legacy for generations to come. The FCLP will hold annual meetings and starting in 2023, it will publish an annual Global Progress Report that includes independent assessments.

==== Coronation of Charles III and Camilla ====
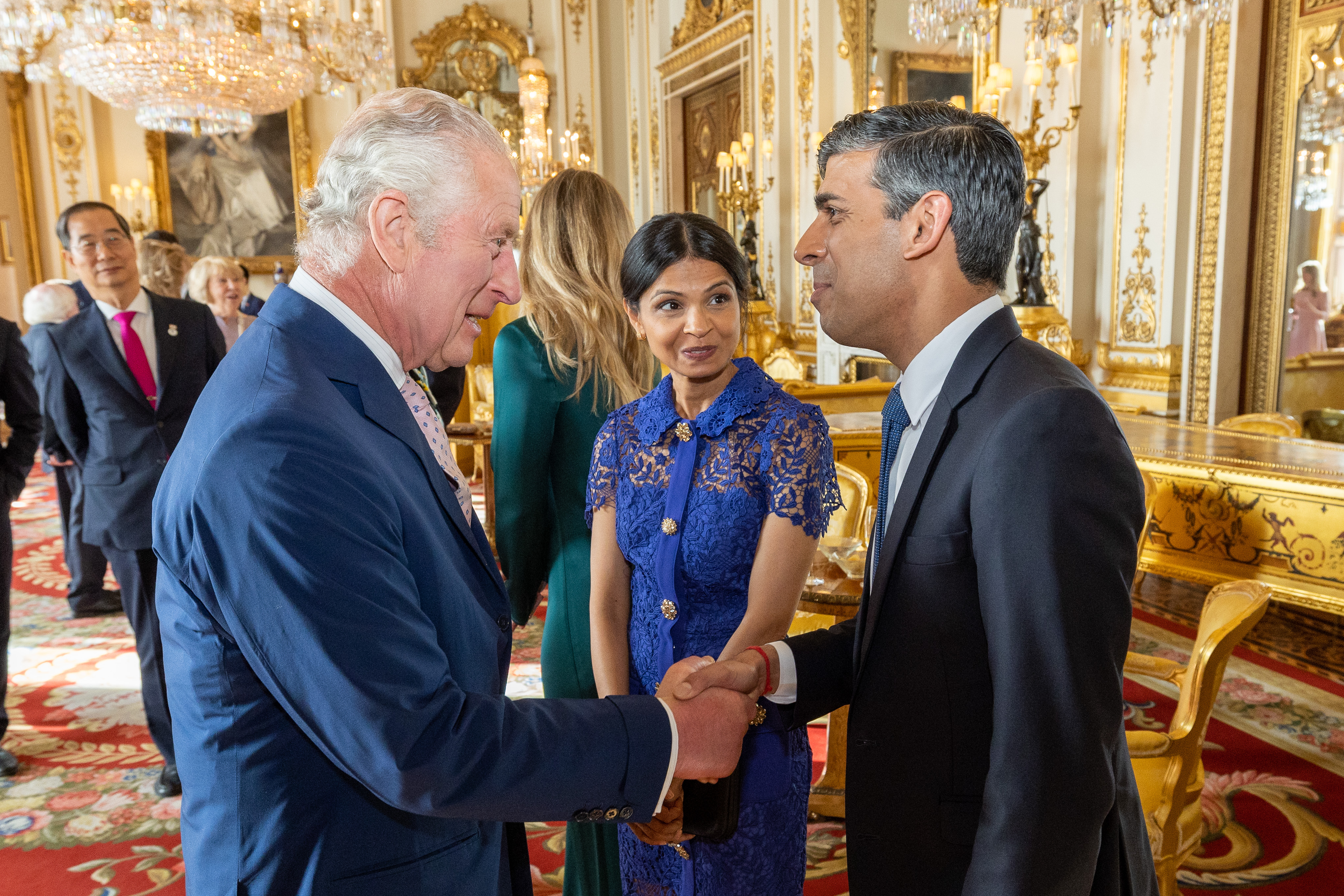
Sunak at a Buckingham Palace reception for heads of state and other visiting dignitaries by King Charles III in May 2023, in preparation for his coronation

Sunak attended the coronation of Charles III and Camilla on 6 May 2023 in his capacity as prime minister, along with all living former prime ministers and his wife Akshata Murty. The following day, Sunak hosted a coronation lunch outside 10 Downing Street, which was attended by volunteers, Ukrainian refugees and youth groups, and U.S. First Lady Jill Biden.

==== Economy ====
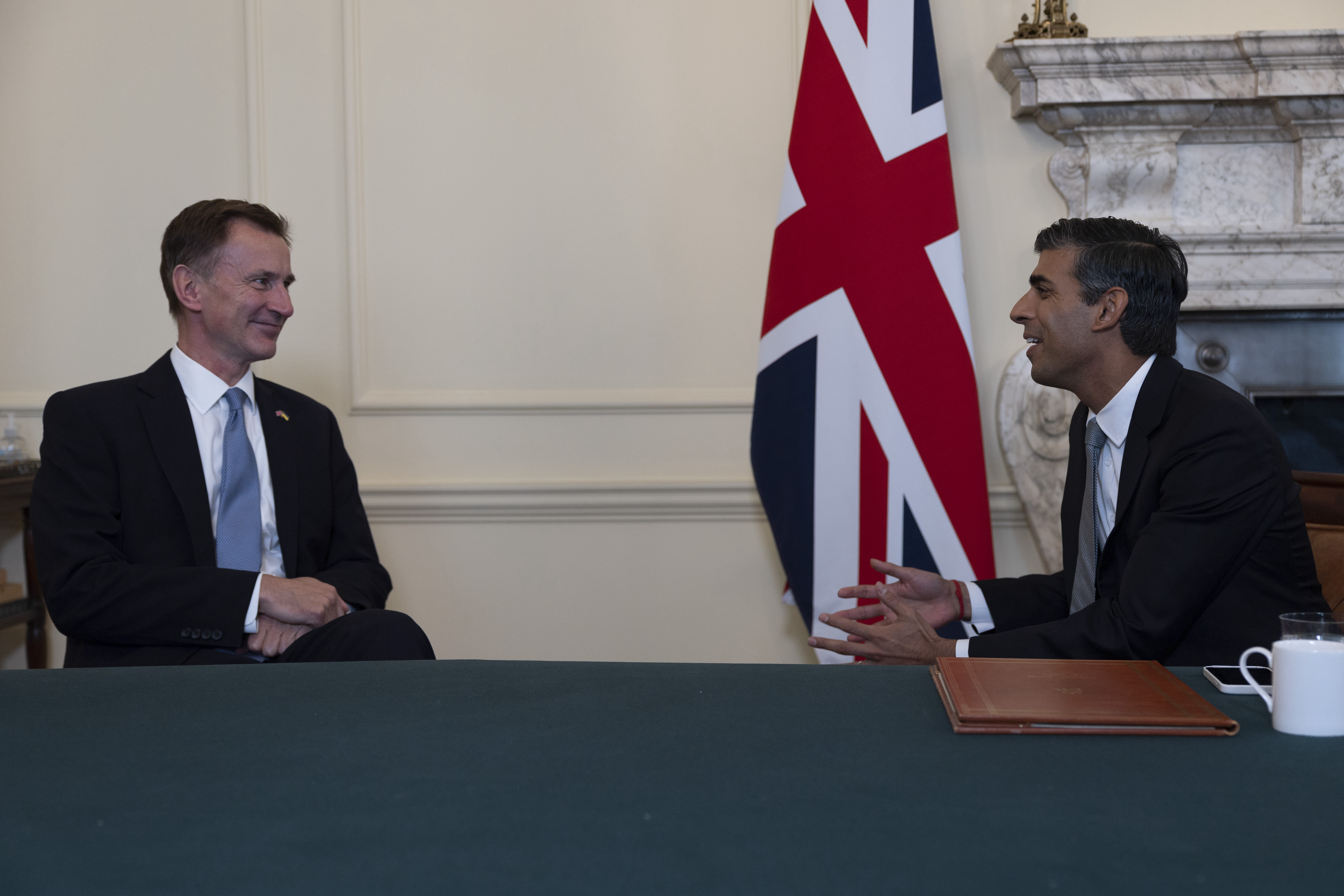
Sunak with his Chancellor, Jeremy Hunt, 25 October 2022

In November 2022 the Bank of England feared the UK would experience prolonged recession and feared unemployment would probably double to 6.5%.

In mid-February 2024, official figures showed that the UK had fallen into recession at the end of 2023. The economy shrank by 0.3% between October and December 2023 whilst it was also announced that the UK's economy grew by only 0.1% in the whole of 2023.

In June 2024, the Office for National Statistics released figures which showed that the economy had grown by 0.7% between January and March, slightly higher than was predicted by previous forecasts, before ceasing to grow in April. This marked the largest quarterly growth in the UK economy since 2021.

==== Education ====
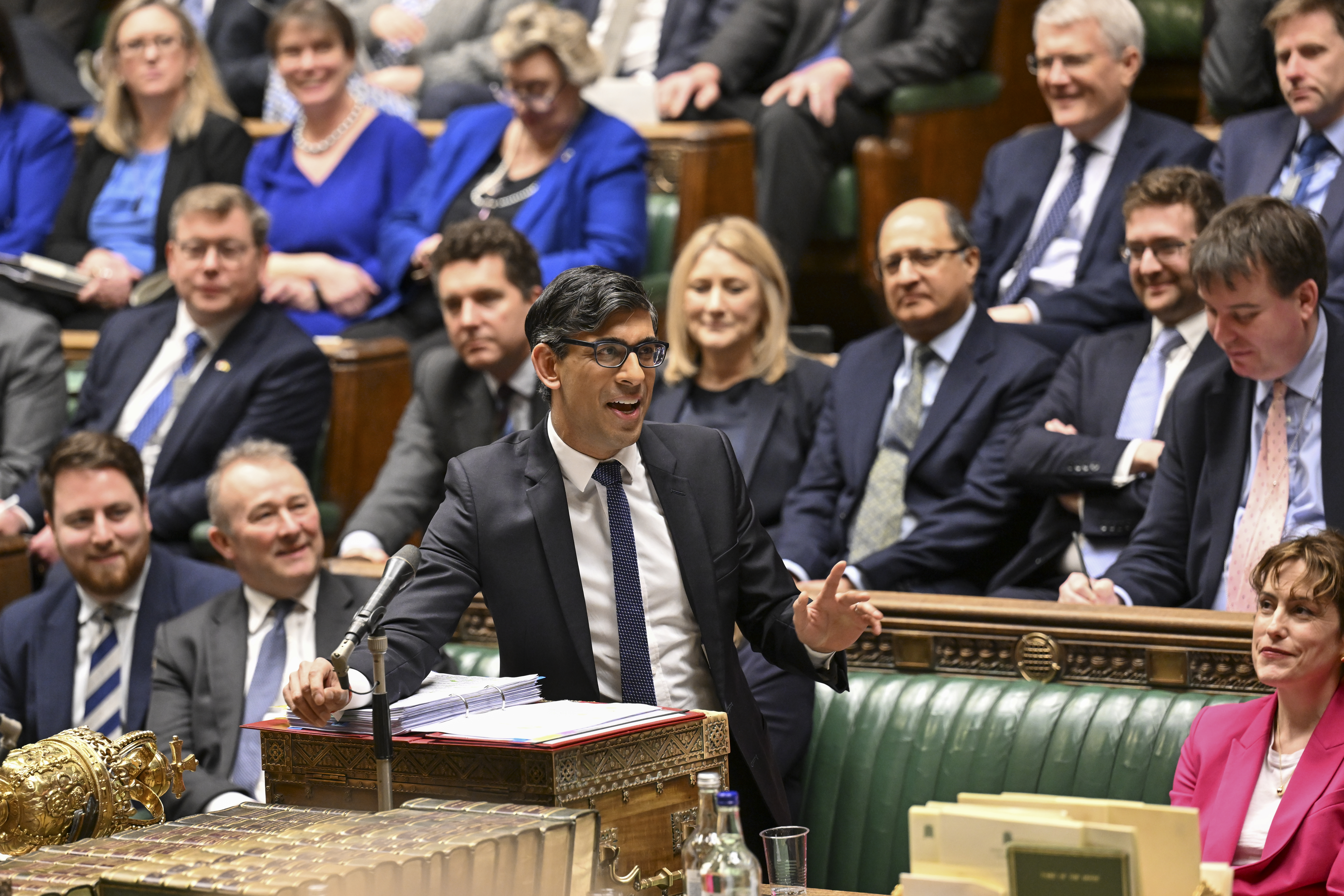
Sunak at Prime Minister's Questions, 7 February 2024

Sunak proposed making mathematics compulsory in schools until the age of 18.

Plans to merge the educational qualifications of A-levels with T Levels into a proposed Advanced British Standard qualification were put forward in his speech, which Downing Street Press Secretary Lucy Noakes said would likely not materialise for "about ten years."

Sunak additionally announced that the government intends to raise the legal age at which individuals can purchase cigarettes by one year annually, thus ultimately making the purchasing of them entirely illegal.

In August 2023 the government ordered over 100 schools to be closed down for repairs due to the presence of structurally unsound reinforced autoclaved aerated concrete (RAAC). Hundreds more buildings, including 18 hospitals, were closed down over the following months due to concerns about the possible presence of RAAC. Sunak was widely blamed for the crisis after former civil servant Jonathan Slater revealed that Sunak, during his tenure as Chancellor of the Exchequer, had reduced the funds available for school repairs despite warnings over the structural integrity of RAAC. The Labour Party tabled a motion to release all files relating to Sunak's role in the crisis but Sunak was able to defeat the motion.

==== Handling of preexisting scandals ====
In August 2023, former neonatal nurse Lucy Letby was convicted of murders and attempted murders of babies between 2015 and 2016, and opted not to attend the sentencing hearing and as such heard neither the various victim impact statements which were read out, nor her sentence being passed. In response, Sunak announced that the UK government would introduce legislation to Parliament that would compel convicted criminals to attend their sentencing hearings, by force if necessary, or face the prospect of more time in prison. This was later proposed during Starmer's premiership as a new clause to the criminal justice bill in a 2024 parliamentary debate. After Letby's conviction the British government ordered an independent inquiry into the circumstances surrounding the deaths and other incidents. It was reported that the British government were examining how Letby's pension can be stopped. Alex Chalk, Secretary of State for Justice, wrote that the government will "look at options to change the law at the earliest opportunity" to compel defendants to attend their sentencing. The education minister Gillian Keegan said that the type of inquiry would be reviewed after the chair was appointed. Health Secretary Steve Barclay announced that the inquiry had been upgraded to a statutory inquiry, describing it as the best way forward and meaning that witnesses would be compelled to give evidence. Former Health Secretary, Jeremy Hunt, apologised to families of the victims during the 2025 hearing for taking "too long" to act.

In December 2023, an amendment was added to the Victims and Prisoners Bill to compensate those affected by the contaminated blood scandal in which thousands of people with haemophilia were infected with HIV and hepatitis C due to receiving contaminated clotting factor products. Sunak's government imposed a three-line whip in an attempt to defeat the amendment, but 22 Conservative MPs broke with the government to vote in favour, successfully passing the amendment by 246 votes to 242 in Sunak's first defeat in the House of Commons. The provision remained in the bill when it passed into law as the Victims and Prisoners Act 2024.

On 10 January 2024, in response to increased calls for those wrongly convicted in the British Post Office scandal to be exonerated, Sunak announced that the government would introduce new legislation to quash all wrongful convictions resulting from the scandal and compensate some of those affected. The Post Office (Horizon Systems) Offences Act, which quashed all criminal convictions in England, Wales and Northern Ireland related to the scandal, was passed on 23 May 2024 and came into force immediately after receiving royal assent the following day, making it one of the last bills to become law before the 2024 general election.

==== Immigration ====
In 2019 the Conservative Party and Boris Johnson pledged to reduce net migration below 250,000 per year, but Sunak said in 2023 that the priority was not to reduce legal immigration but to stop illegal immigration. Nearly 30,000 undocumented migrants crossed the Channel in small boats to the UK in 2023. Long-term net migration to the United Kingdom (the number of people immigrating minus the number emigrating) reached a record high of 764,000 in 2022, with legal immigration at 1.26 million and emigration at 493,000. Of the 1,218,000 legal migrants coming to the UK in 2023, only 10% were EU Nationals.

==== Industrial disputes ====
Following several months of industrial disputes, public sector workers including teachers, police and doctors were offered pay rises of between 5 and 7%. Sunak said the pay rise would be funded by significantly increasing visa fees for migrants and the levy migrants pay to use the NHS.

==== Law and order ====
On 29 March 2023, Sunak's government introduced the Victims and Prisoners Bill with the stated intention of "plac[ing] victims at the heart of the justice system". The bill would establish an independent body to support victims of major crimes and give government ministers the power to veto the parole of certain prisoners and restrict marriages from those serving whole life orders. The bill, which also included provisions to compensate victims of the infected blood scandal and deny parental rights to people convicted of murdering their partners, was passed into law on 24 May 2024 as the Victims and Prisoners Act 2024 just before Parliament was dissolved for the 2024 general election.

In August 2023 the government announced proposals to overhaul sentencing laws in order to make whole life orders the starting point in murder cases involving sexual assault or sadistic conduct, only to be discounted in exceptional circumstances. The plans came in response to the murders of Zara Aleena and Sabina Nessa, two high-profile cases in which perpetrators convicted of rape and murder did not receive whole-life orders. The bill that would have implemented this change, known as the Sentencing Bill, was drafted but later abandoned as the government ran out of time to introduce it before the 2024 election. In the same month, Sunak announced plans to crack down on violent crime by increasing penalties for the illegal sale of zombie knives and widening the powers of police officers to allow them to seize weapons with "no practical use" more easily.

==== Levelling Up ====
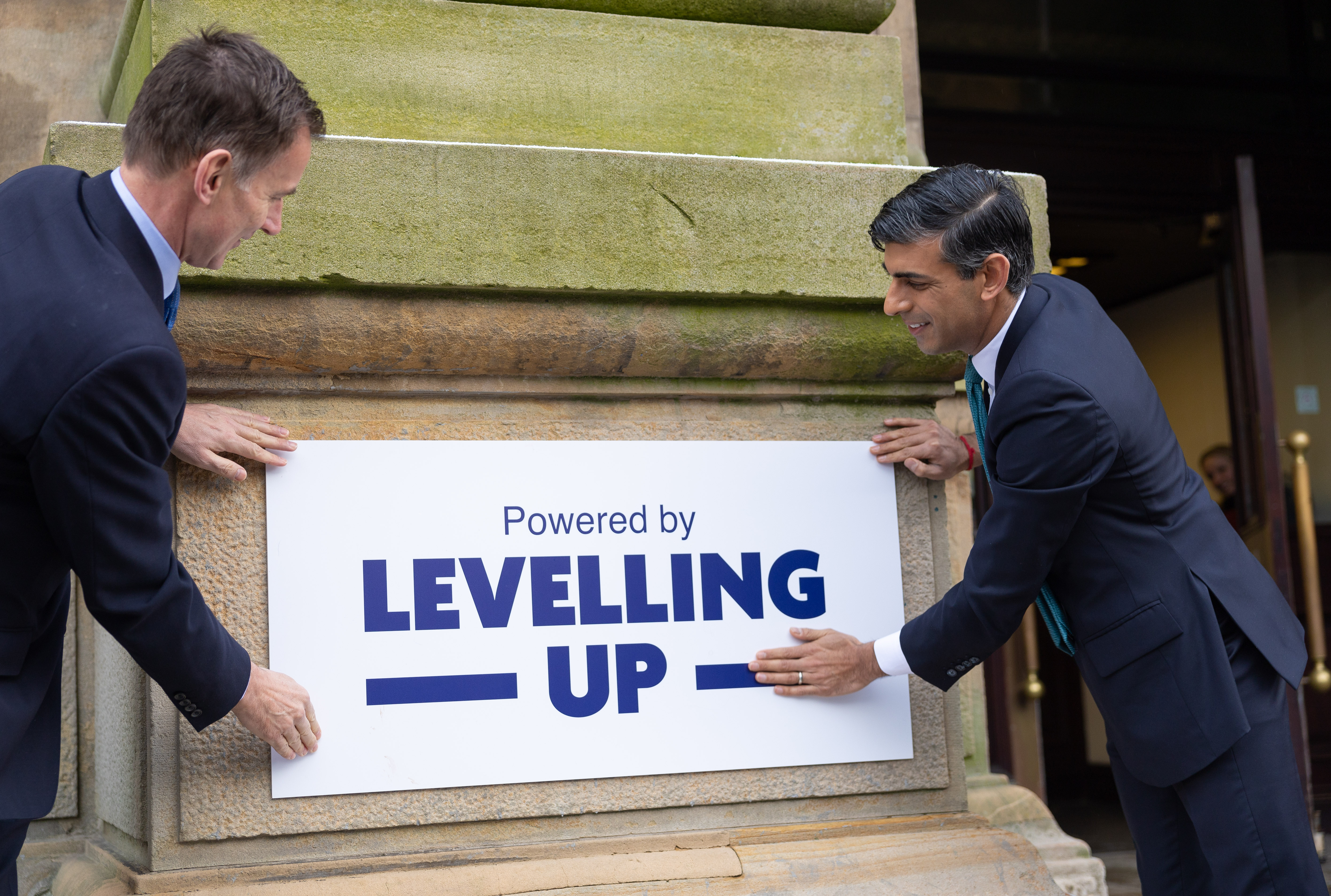
Chancellor of the Exchequer Jeremy Hunt (left) and Prime Minister Rishi Sunak (right) in January 2023, promoting the government's "Levelling up policies", on a visit to Accrington Market

Sunak remained committed to the Levelling Up policy of the Johnson era. Under his premiership, the government delivered the planned second phase of the Levelling-Up Fund totalling £2.1bn, and reallocating funding from the cancellation of HS2 to projects aimed at levelling up local transport networks. However research by the Institute for Government found that, while there had been some "promising steps" on the progression of Levelling Up, the policy had generally "lost momentum" under Sunak's leadership.

=== Foreign affairs ===
==== Ukraine ====
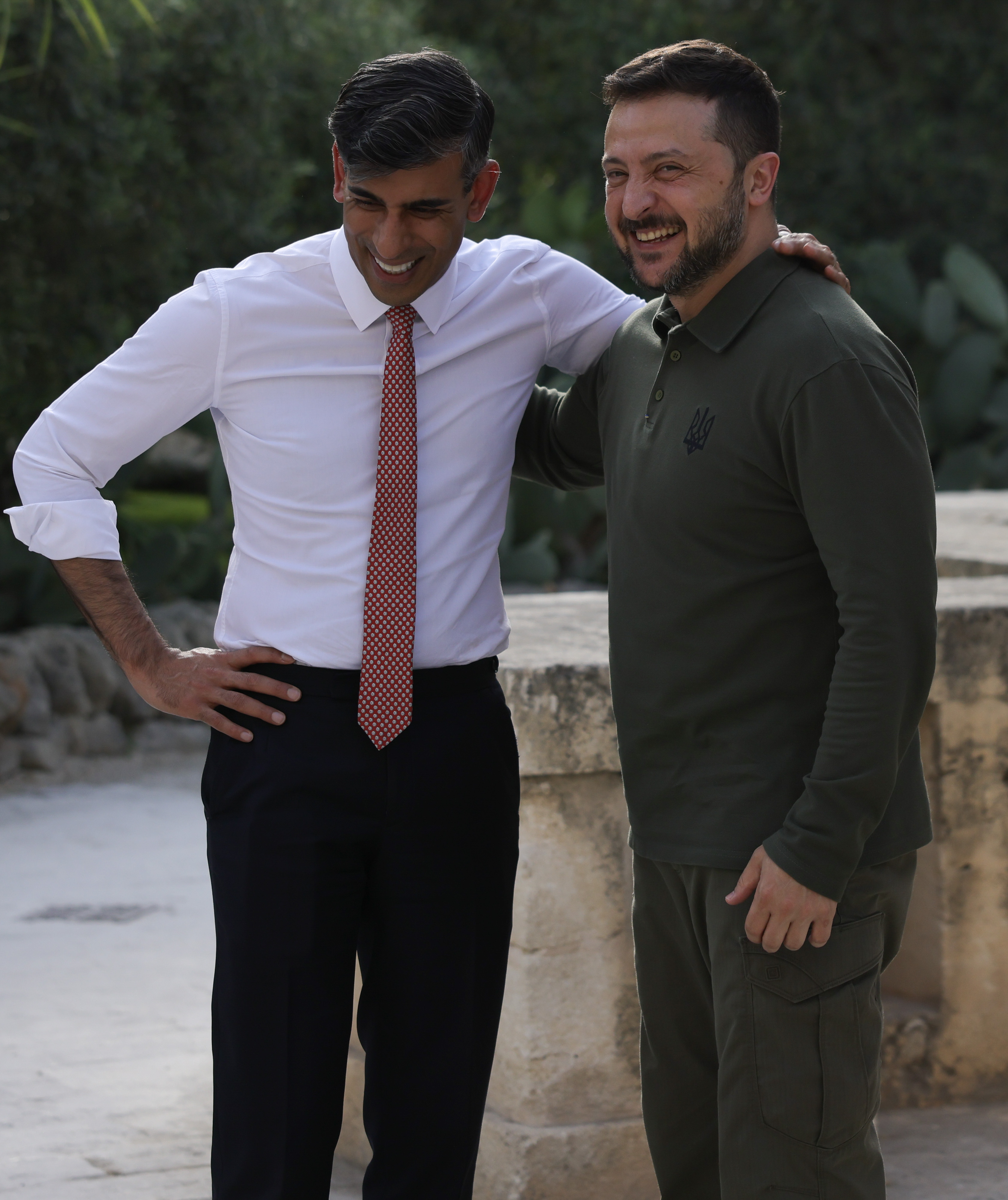
Sunak holding a bilateral meeting with Ukrainian president Volodymyr Zelenskyy at the G7 Summit in Borgo Egnazia (Fasano) in Apulia, Italy, 13 June 2024

Following the 15 November missile explosion in Poland, Sunak met U.S. president Joe Biden and delivered a speech. Sunak later met Ukrainian president Volodymyr Zelenskyy, and pledged to give Ukraine £50 million in aid. After meeting Zelenskyy, Sunak said: "I am proud of how the UK stood with Ukraine from the very beginning. And I am here today to say the UK and our allies will continue to stand with Ukraine, as it fights to end this barbarous war and deliver a just peace."

Sunak visited Ukraine on 12 January 2024 to sign a new U.K.-Ukraine Agreement on Security Cooperation with Zelenskyy promising £2.5 billion in military aid to Ukraine, including long-range missiles, artillery ammunition, air defence and maritime security, in addition to £200 million to be spent on military drones, making the United Kingdom the largest deliverer of drones to Ukraine out of any nation according to Downing Street.

==== Brexit ====
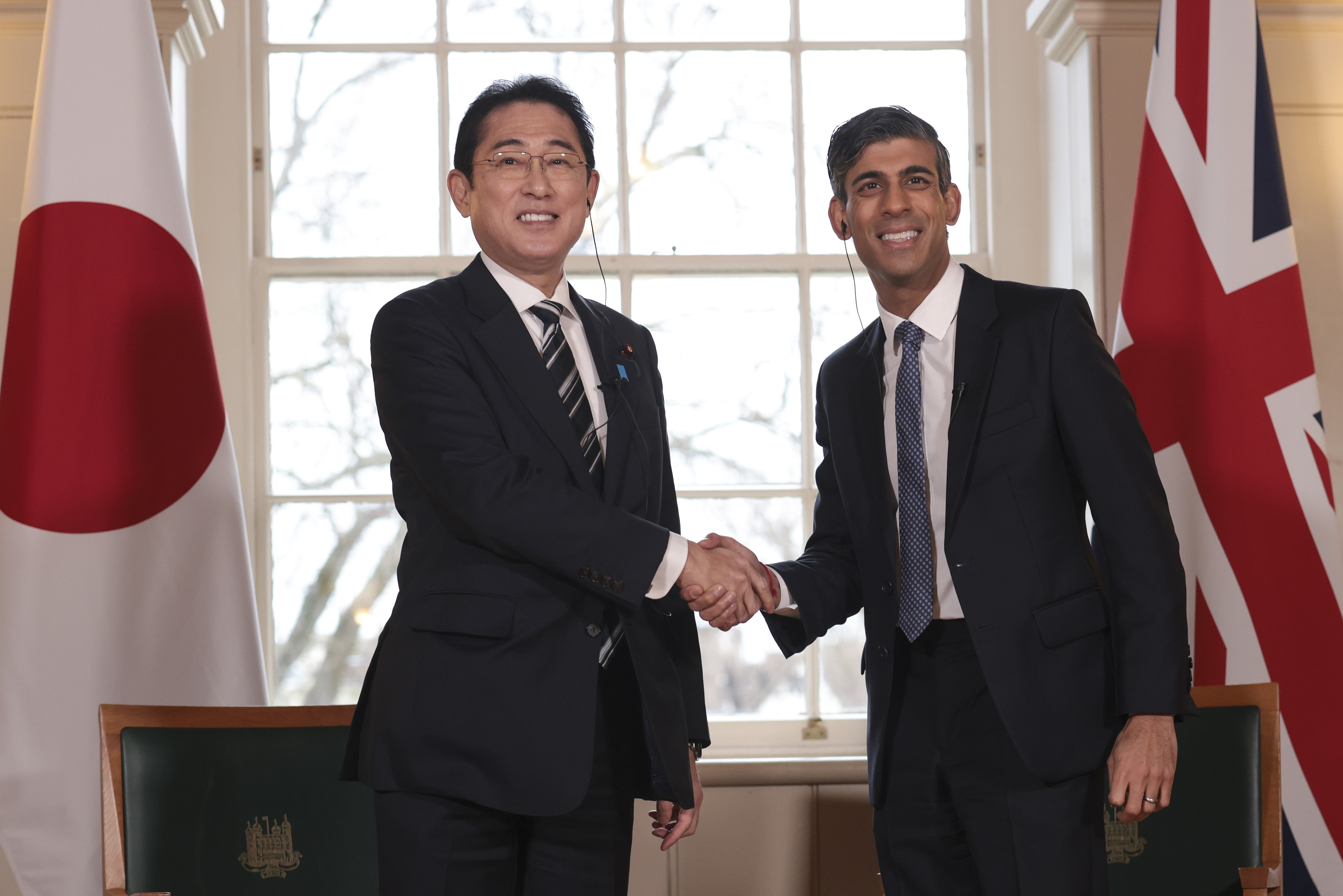
Sunak with Japanese prime minister Fumio Kishida in January 2023

In January 2023, Sunak confirmed that the deadline for removal of EU legislation from the UK statute book would remain the end of that year, saying that it should be a "collective effort". This ultimately did not come to fruition.

In February 2023, Sunak negotiated a proposed agreement with the EU on Northern Ireland's trading arrangements which was published as the "Windsor Framework". On 27 February, Sunak delivered a statement to the House of Commons, saying that the proposed agreement "protects Northern Ireland's place in our Union. The Framework came into effect on 1 October 2023. The Windsor Framework was however opposed by the Democratic Unionist Party (DUP) who, for 22 months, refused to nominate a deputy First Minister to restore the Northern Ireland Executive.

The DUP eventually returned to Stormont in February 2024 after reaching a deal with Sunak's government. The UK Government published a command paper laying out the deal. The deal will end the alignment of EU law in Northern Ireland. Due to the Brexit withdrawal agreement, internal trade was disrupted between the British Isles. A DUP agreement with the Sunak ministry will reportedly reduce checks and paperwork on goods moving from Great Britain to Northern Ireland. This involves the creation of a "UK internal market" in order to ease unionist fears over de-facto border in the Irish Sea.

==== Migrant crossings ====
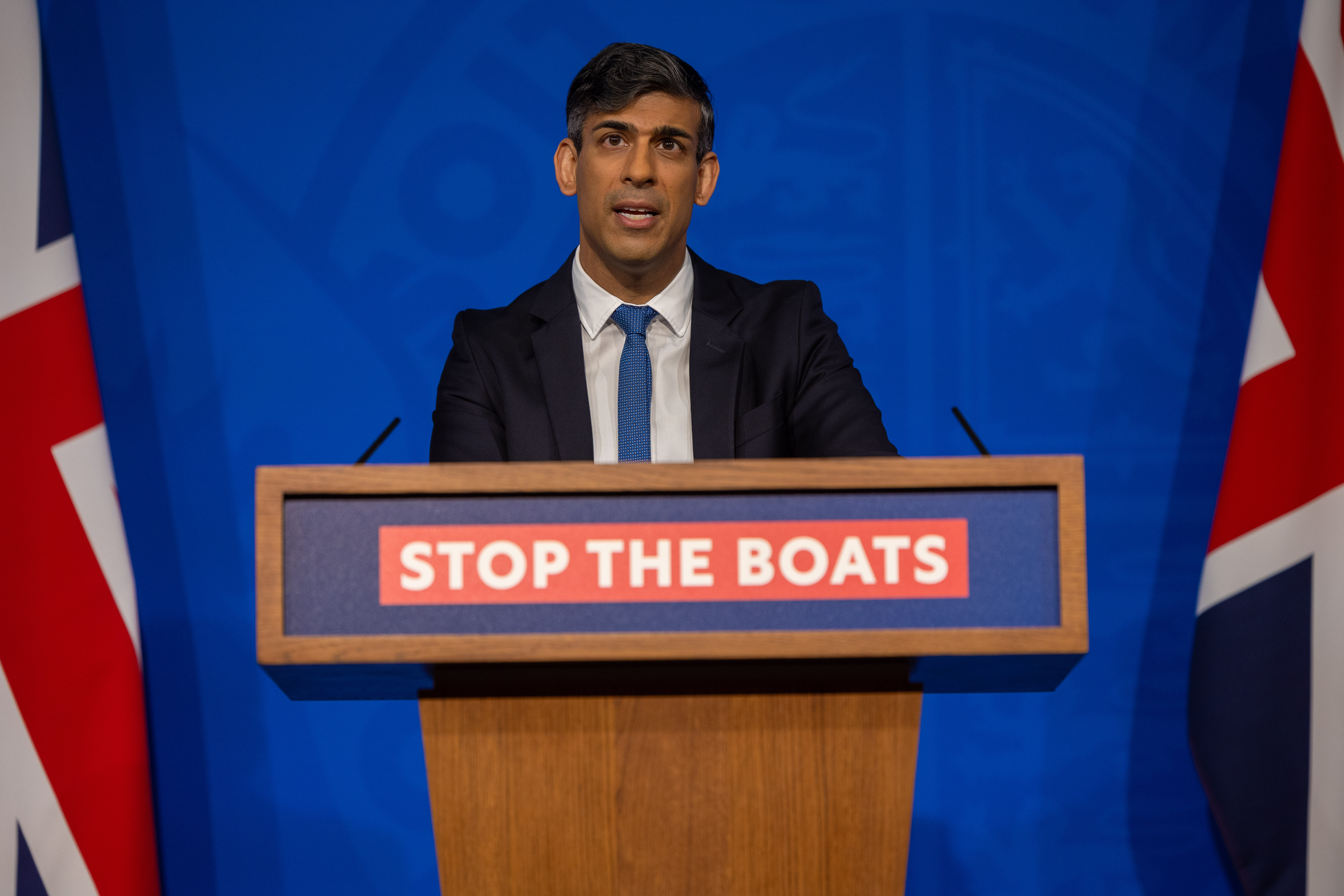
Sunak holding a press conference on the Rwanda asylum plan, April 2024

After 45,000 people had crossed the Channel on small boats in the previous year, Sunak announced that stopping these boats would be one of his five priorities for 2023, adding: "We will pass new laws to stop small boats, making sure that if you come to this country illegally, you are detained and swiftly removed." Sunak adopted the slogan "stop the boats" which was previously used by the Australian prime minister Tony Abbott during his 2013 election campaign.

The Illegal Migration Bill was introduced in March 2023, proposing that people arriving via unofficial routes would be refused asylum and would be detained for at least 28 days before being removed to another safe country. The home secretary would have a duty to remove the migrants who arrive without prior permission. The bill also proposes that these migrants would not be able to use modern slavery laws to challenge government decisions to remove them. Home Secretary Suella Braverman said the bill may be not be compatible with the European Convention on Human Rights. Questions also arose on the feasibility of the policy such as if there was adequate capacity to hold the people for 28 days or if there were enough agreements with safe countries already in place. The United Nations High Commissioner for Refugees said that it was "profoundly concerned" by the bill, warning that the bill amounted to an asylum ban for those who arrive irregularly.

In June 2023, the UK's Court of Appeal ruled the Rwanda asylum plan was unlawful, for which Sunak's government appealed. In November 2023, UK's Supreme Court upheld the ruling. In response to the ruling, Sunak first sent Foreign Secretary James Cleverly to sign a second treaty with Rwanda which would ensure that migrants sent to Rwanda cannot be sent to other countries, only back to the United Kingdom, in order to address the court's concerns over refoulement. His government then introduced the Safety of Rwanda (Asylum and Immigration) Bill, which would allow them to disapply certain aspects of international law and the Human Rights Act 1998 in order to declare Rwanda a safe country under UK law. However, despite calls from the party's right, the government resisted completely disapplying the European Convention on Human Rights due to the Rwandan government opposing such measures. The bill faced criticism from both the left and the right of the Conservative Party, with immigration minister Robert Jenrick resigning in protest at what he saw as the bill not going far enough. Despite opposition from every other party and large sections of the Conservatives, the government managed to secure a majority of 44 at the bill's second reading, with many on the right of the party abstaining from voting.

The Safety of Rwanda Bill passed its third reading on 17 January 2024, with Sunak resisting attempts by Conservative MPs to "toughen up" the bill, which now faces a "titanic battle" in the House of Lords. On 23 January Sunak suffered his first defeat in the House of Lords ahead of the Rwanda bill vote when peers voted against ratifying the U.K.–Rwanda treaty signed the previous year guaranteeing non-refoulement, a central part of Sunak's asylum plan. While the vote is not binding, it was seen by observers as a major blow to Sunak which could signal that the Safety of Rwanda Bill may be defeated in the upcoming vote.

Sunak was criticised by a number of Conservative MPs when it was revealed that the government had allowed around 16,000 asylum seekers to work in occupations with staff shortages such as care, construction and agriculture. The government was accused of creating a "pull factor" which could encourage migrants to come to the U.K. illegally in order to seek work. The Safety of Rwanda (Asylum and Immigration) Act 2024 declared Rwanda a safe country.

==== Sudan ====
With the outbreak of the War in Sudan in April 2023, Sunak's government was widely criticised for its perceived failure to evacuate British nationals, with Sunak prioritising evacuating British embassy staff while thousands of British nationals remained trapped in Sudan. During a 72-hour ceasefire the government authorised RAF airlifts to evacuate British citizens from the Wadi Saeedna airstrip in Khartoum; however on 27 April the government announced that thousands of British visa holders, including a number of NHS doctors who had lived in the U.K. for years, would not be included in the evacuation as they did not possess British citizenship, and would instead be expected to make their way to alternative evacuation routes.

==== Gaza war ====
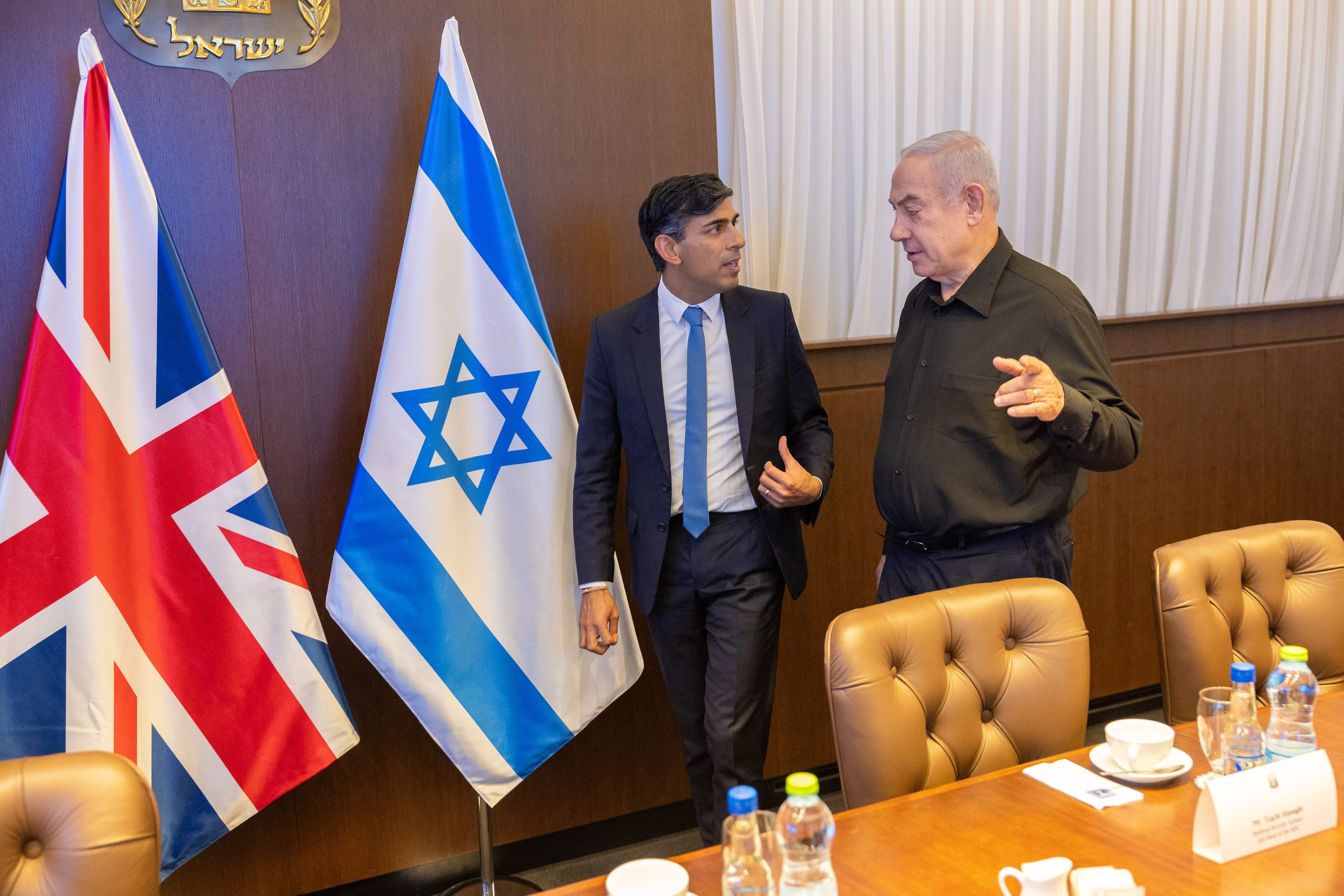
Sunak with Israeli Prime Minister Benjamin Netanyahu in Jerusalem, 19 October 2023

In October 2023, Hamas launched a surprise attack on Israel that devolved into a war and a growing humanitarian crisis in the Gaza Strip. Sunak pledged the UK's support for Israel and declared that Israel "has an absolute right to defend itself". Sunak backed calls for humanitarian pauses to allow for aid to be brought into Gaza, although he initially rejected calls for a full ceasefire as he argued that this would only benefit Hamas. However, Sunak later condemned the high number of civilian casualties during the Israeli bombardment of Gaza and called for a "sustainable ceasefire" in which all Israeli hostages are returned to Israel, attacks against Israel cease and humanitarian aid is allowed into Gaza. His government supports the two-state solution as a resolution to the conflict.

Since the outbreak of the war, Sunak's government pledged millions of pounds in humanitarian aid to civilians in the Gaza strip and pushed for the opening of the Rafah Border Crossing to allow for the evacuation of British nationals and the provision of aid to civilians. Sunak also deployed Royal Navy and Royal Air Force assets to patrol the eastern Mediterranean Sea with the stated purpose of supporting humanitarian efforts and monitoring threats to regional security. Sunak's administration has implemented sanctions against leading figures in Hamas and Palestinian Islamic Jihad, including Hamas co-founder Mahmoud al-Zahar, as well as imposing travel bans against Israeli settlers involved in violent activities in the West Bank.

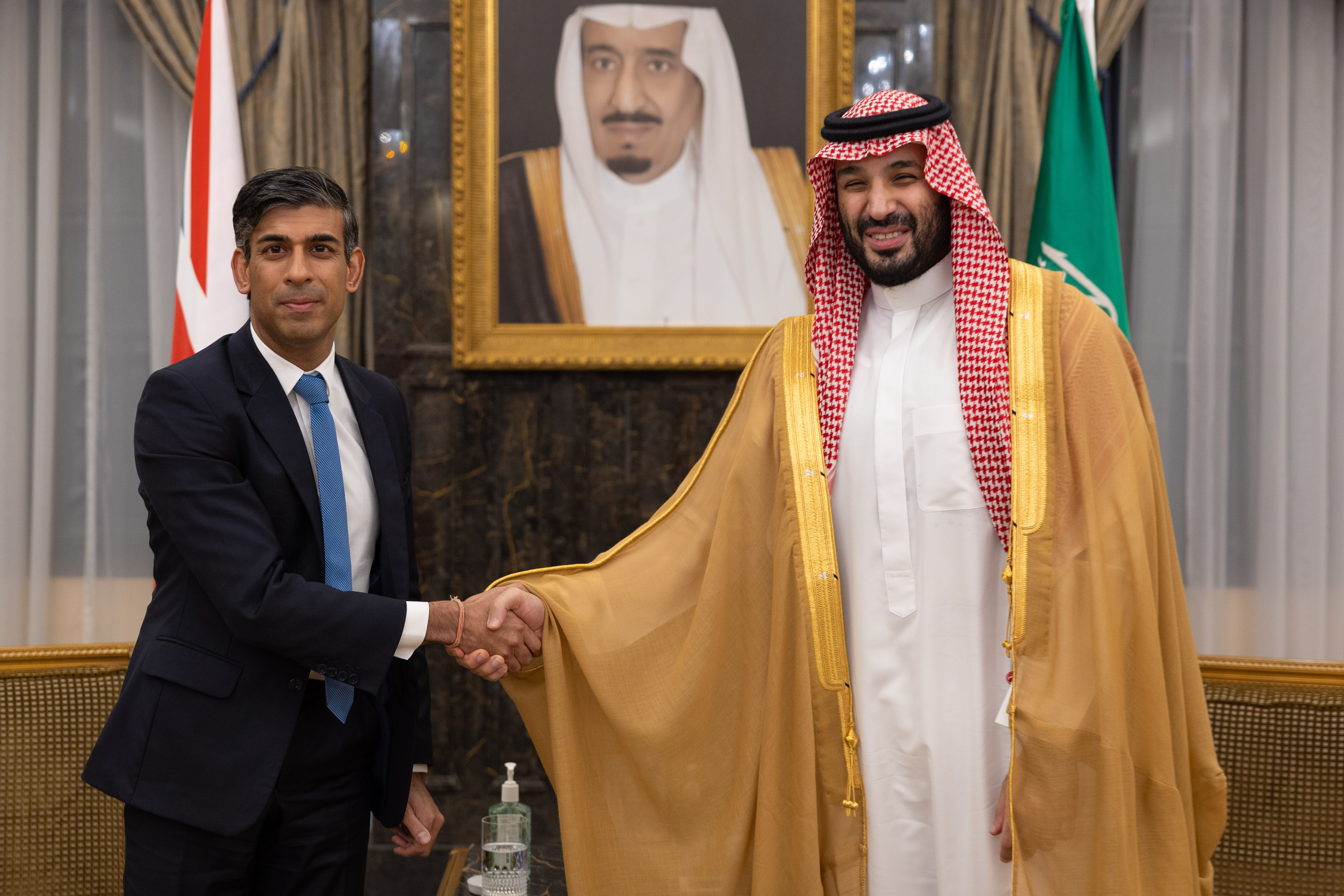
Sunak with Saudi Crown Prince Mohammed bin Salman in Riyadh, Saudi Arabia, 19 October 2023

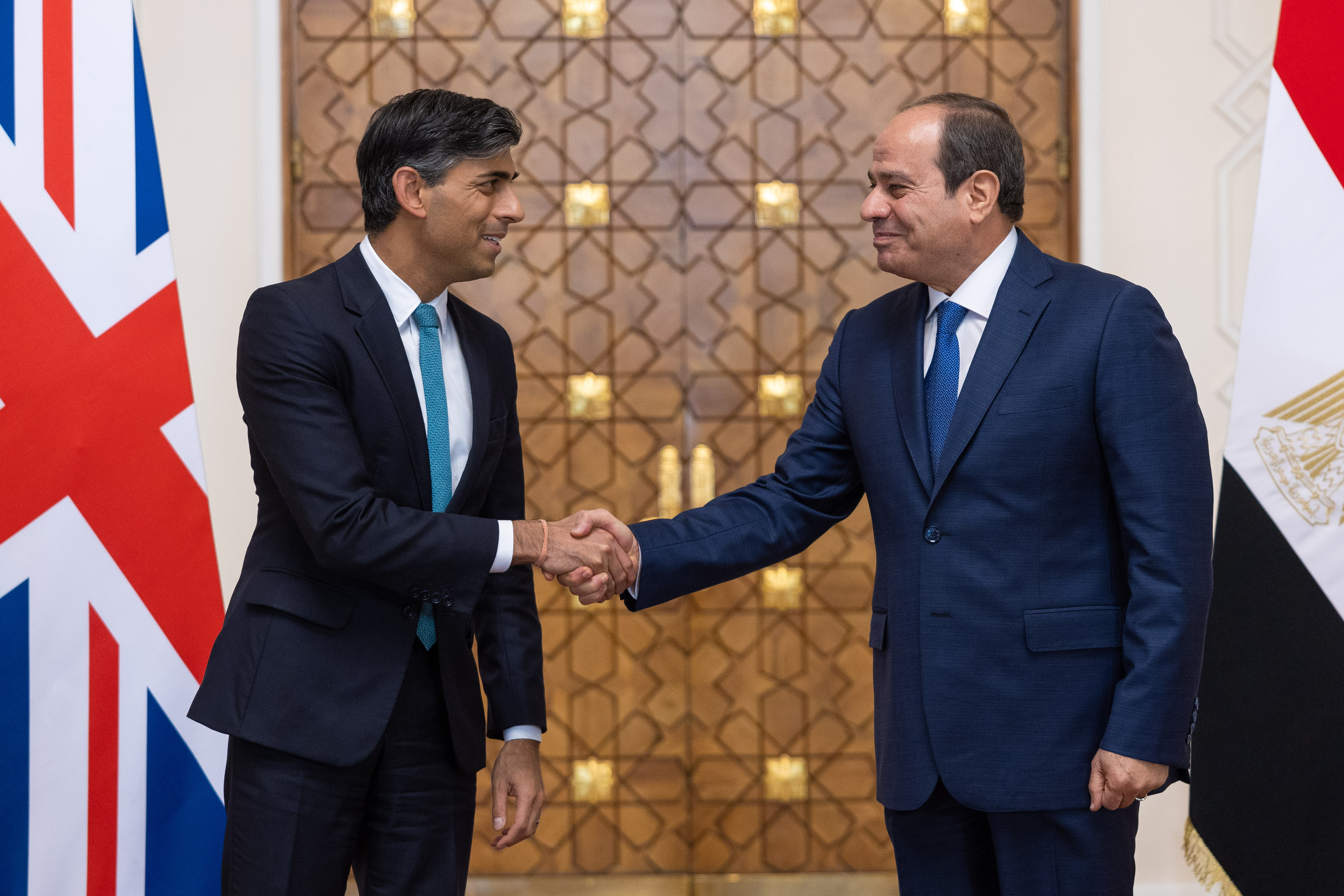
Sunak with Egyptian president Abdel Fattah El-Sisi in Cairo, Egypt, 20 October 2023

Sunak reaffirmed his support for humanitarian pauses and an eventual ceasefire in the war in Gaza ahead of a debate on the subject on 21 February 2024, but argued that an immediate ceasefire would not be successful and would not be in anyone's interest. The following day, the Scottish National Party tabled an opposition day amendment calling for an immediate ceasefire. Sunak's government tabled an amendment supporting an eventual ceasefire while emphasizing its support for Israel's right to self-defence and opposition to Hamas. However, in a break with Parliamentary convention, Speaker of the House Lindsay Hoyle chose to select a non-binding Labour Party amendment calling for an immediate ceasefire to be voted on first, which led to the government withdrawing its amendment and the Labour amendment being passed without a vote taking place. Amidst the ensuing controversy, Sunak described Hoyle's actions as "very concerning" but did not support calls from within the Conservative Party for the Speaker to be ousted.

The British government continued its policy of providing humanitarian aid to civilians in Gaza. On 21 February 2024, the U.K. delivered aid to northern Gaza, inaccessible by land or sea, for the first time via air-drops by the Jordanian air force, having reached an arrangement with Jordan to deliver aid into Gaza on the U.K.'s behalf. On 25 February the government pledged a further £4.25 million in sexual and reproductive aid to Palestinian women, projected to reach around 1 in 5 women in Gaza.

When the International Criminal Court prosecutor Karim Ahmad Khan announced that he would seek to charge Israeli president Benjamin Netanyahu with war crimes, Sunak denounced the move as "unhelpful" and accused Khan of drawing a moral equivalence between Israel and Hamas.

==== Sanctions ====
On 8 December 2023, ahead of the 75th anniversary of the United Nations Declaration of Human Rights, Sunak's government unveiled a set of 46 sanctions against individuals linked to human trafficking and authoritarian governments around the world. The individuals targeted by the sanctions included 17 members of the Belarusian judiciary, two Haitians linked to the 2018 La Saline attacks, eight accused of atrocities during the Syrian Civil War and five from the Iranian authorities targeted for their involvement in enforcing mandatory hijab law, as well as 14 individuals and entities linked to human trafficking in Myanmar, Laos and Cambodia.

==== Boycotts ====
Sunak experienced a minor rebellion in the House of Commons on 10 January over the Economic Activity of Public Bodies (Overseas Matters) Bill, a bill that would prevent publicly funded bodies from imposing their own boycotts against a particular international territory without the backing of the government. The bill, which was introduced by communities secretary Michael Gove the previous year, was widely seen as intended to prevent councils from imposing sanctions on Israel amidst widespread outrage over accusations of war crimes in the ongoing war against Hamas, with many terming it the "anti-BDS bill". The bill was widely criticised for measures termed as "draconian" by critics which included making it illegal for members of public bodies to say they would support a boycott if it were legal. Eight Conservative MPs rebelled to vote against the bill, but the majority voted within the party line and the bill passed its third reading in the House of Commons. The bill was later abandoned after the government ran out of time to introduce it to the House of Lords before the 2024 election.

==== Yemen ====
On 12 January 2024, Sunak and US president Joe Biden authorised a series of missile strikes against Houthi militias in Yemen, in response to a large scale attack on British and American naval assets in the region two days earlier during Operation Prosperity Guardian. The strikes reportedly killed five Houthi fighters and injured six others. Sunak defended the airstrikes as being self-defence against Houthi aggression, although the Liberal Democrats and Green Party criticised the fact that Sunak had unilaterally ordered military action without consulting Parliament.

On 22 January Sunak and Biden launched a second round of strikes against Houthi targets. In a statement to the House of Commons the following day Sunak said that the strikes were intended as a warning to the Houthis to cease their attacks on shipping in the Red Sea and warned that the United Kingdom would not hesitate to strike again in self-defence. The U.K. launched two further rounds of strikes in conjunction with the U.S. on 3 February and 24 February.

=== Party management ===
==== Scandals ====
===== Sleaze scandals involving MPs =====
A number of scandals involving Conservative MPs (widely known as "sleaze") have occurred during Sunak's premiership.

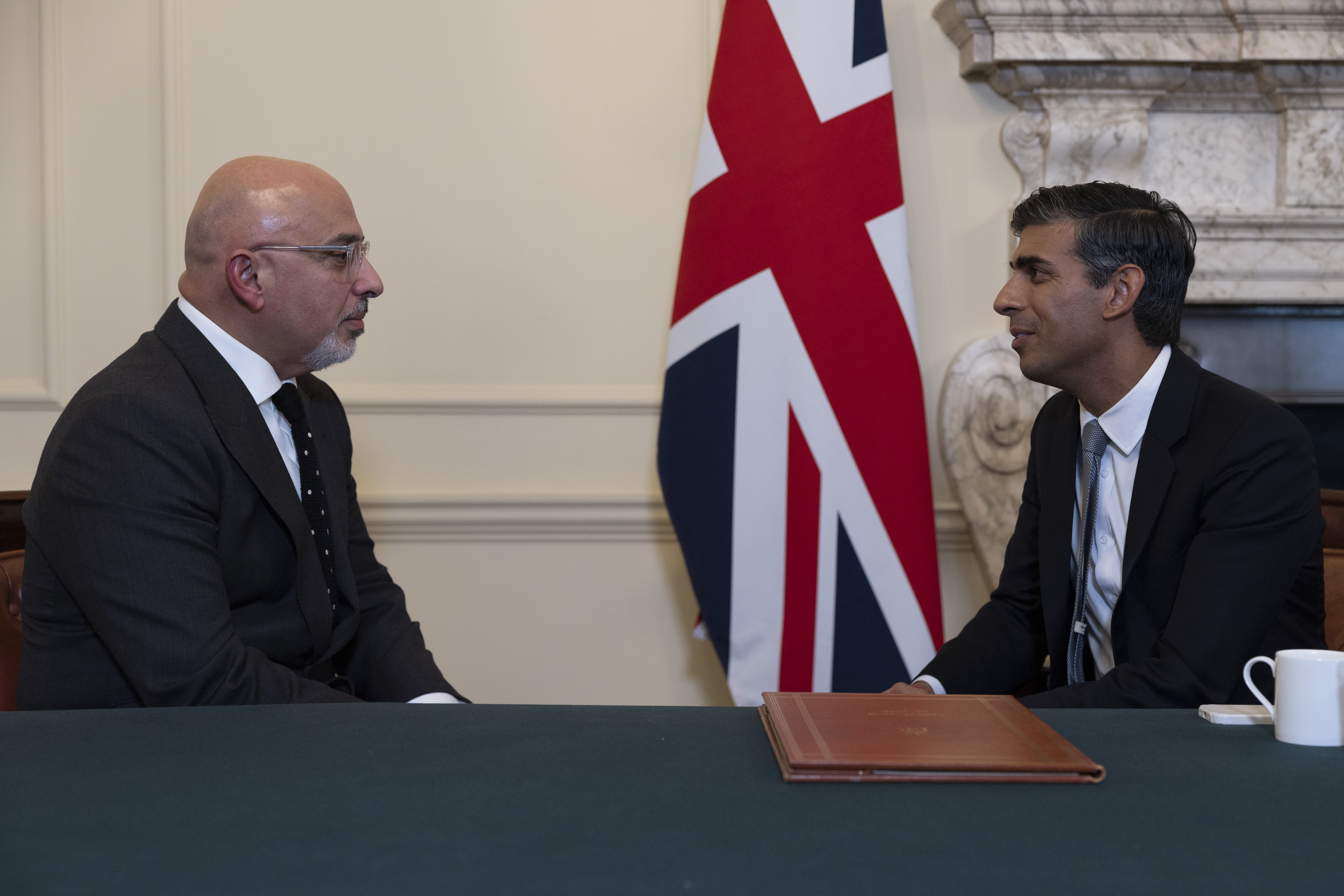
Sunak with Nadhim Zahawi

Gavin Williamson resigned in November 2022 after allegations that he had used improper language to Wendy Morton and had bullied several staffers during his time as a cabinet minister under Theresa May, to avoid being a distraction for Sunak's government. At Prime Minister's Questions on 9 November, Sunak said it was "absolutely right" that Williamson had resigned and said: "I obviously regret appointing someone who has had to resign in these circumstances".

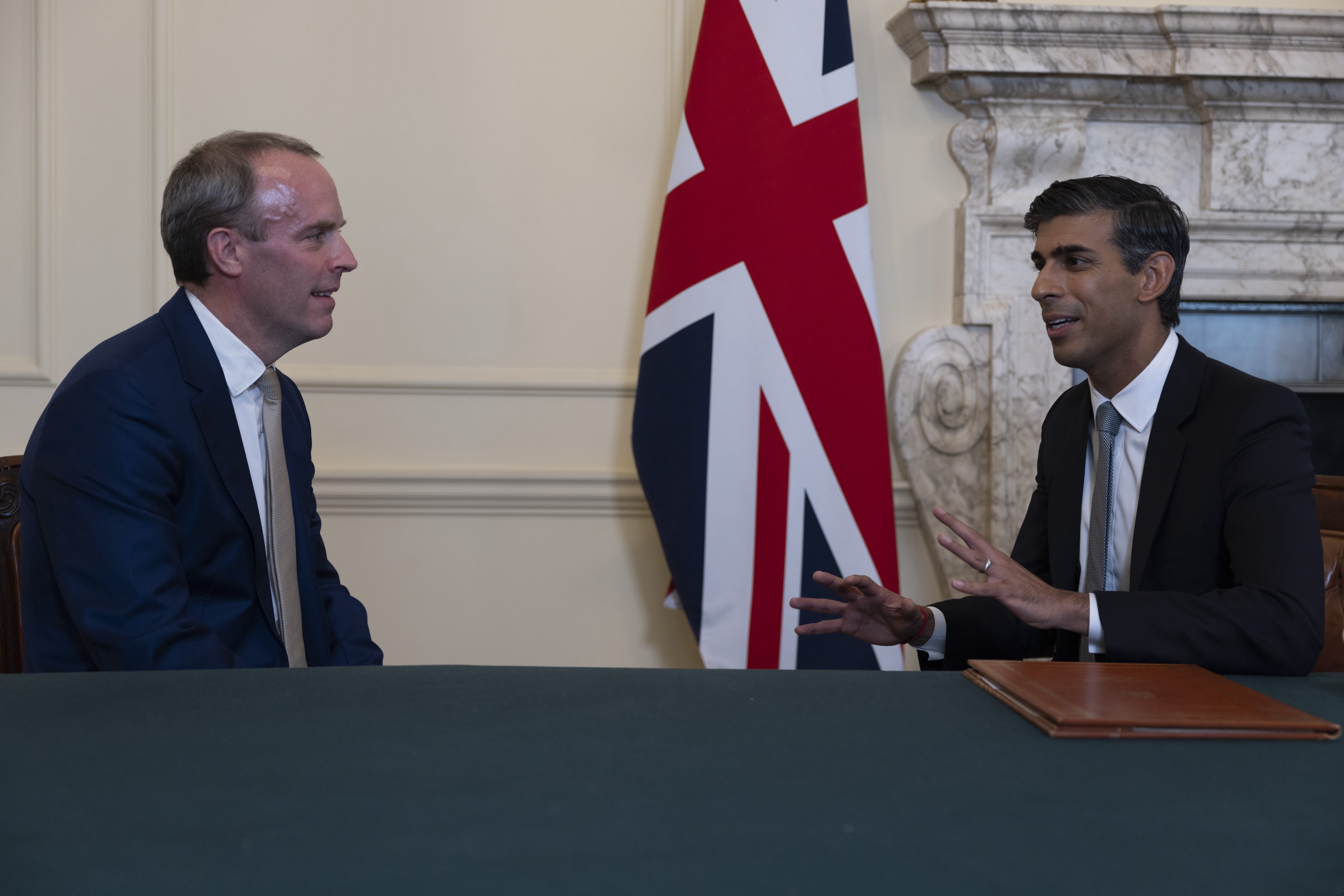
Sunak with Dominic Raab

Nadhim Zahawi's tax arrangements attracted public attention in January 2023. Sunak asked Laurie Magnus, the Independent Adviser on Ministers' Interests, to investigate Zahawi's personal financial arrangements and declarations. The report identified seven breaches of the Ministerial Code and was published on 29 January 2023. Sunak dismissed Zahawi immediately after he was found to have breached the Ministerial Code by failing to disclose that he was being investigated by HM Revenue and Customs while he served as chancellor under Johnson.

The Cabinet Office told officials at No 10 there were informal complaints about Dominic Raab's behaviour before Sunak made him deputy prime minister according to The Times. In 2023, Raab faced an independent investigation into complaints arising from his prior tenures as Lord Chancellor and foreign secretary under Boris Johnson while eight complaints were being formally investigated over his bullying. Sunak stated he did not know about formal complaints but his press secretary did not confirm or deny whether Sunak knew of informal complaints. On 14 December 2022, eight accusations of bullying were being formally investigated. On 21 April 2023, Raab resigned as deputy prime minister the day after Sunak received the report into Raab's behaviour, which found that he had bullied civil servants.

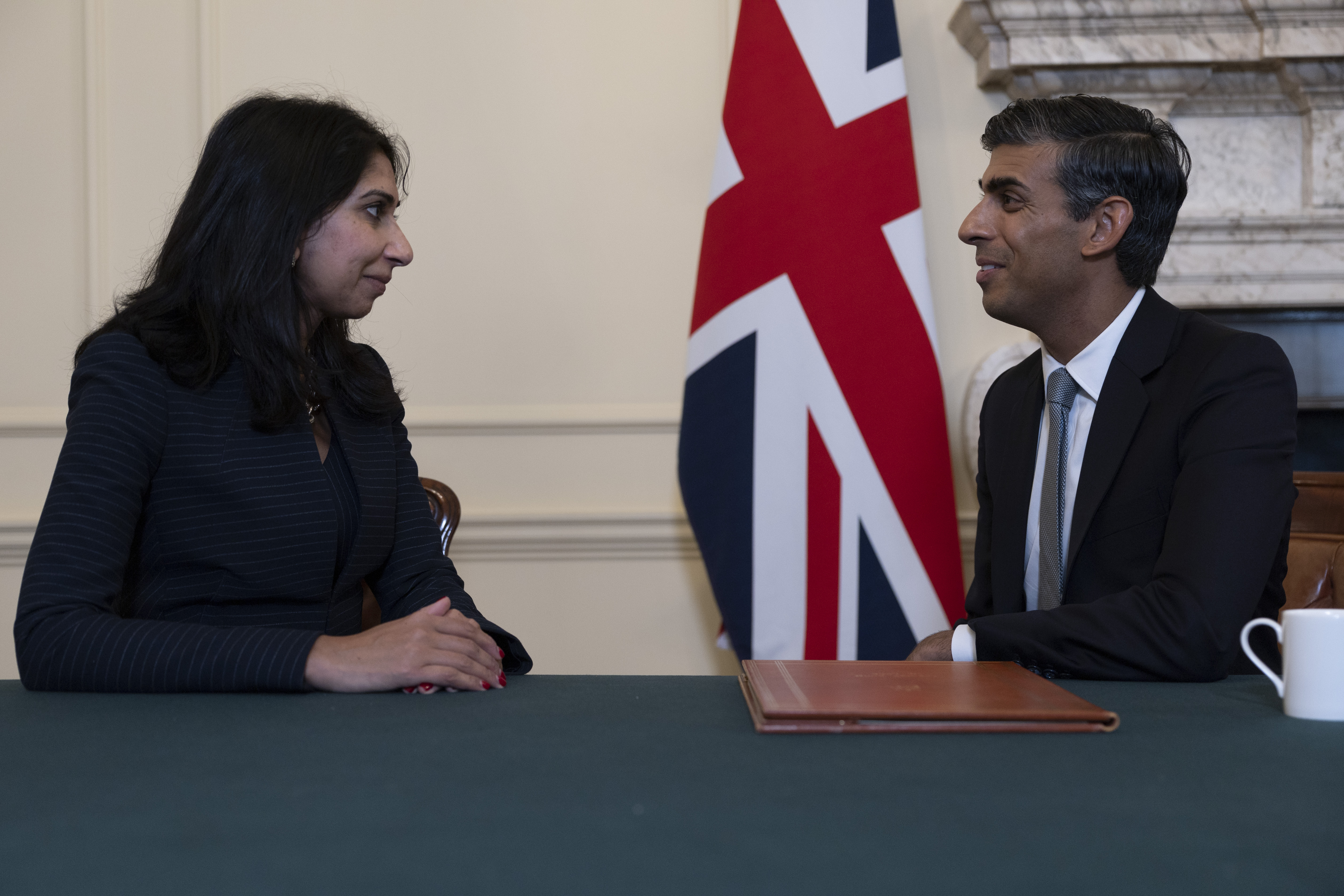
Sunak with Suella Braverman

On 25 October, Suella Braverman was reappointed as the Home Secretary by Sunak upon the formation of the Sunak ministry. Braverman's reappointment was challenged by Labour Party MPs, Liberal Democrats, Scottish National Party MPs and some Conservatives. The Labour leader and Leader of the Opposition, Keir Starmer, raised it as the subject of his first question to Sunak at Sunak's first Prime Minister's Questions on 26 October 2022. Sunak said Braverman "made an error of judgment but she recognised that she raised the matter and she accepted her mistake". Following the 2023 Hamas attack on Israel, Braverman was sacked as home secretary in the cabinet reshuffle of 13 November 2023, and was replaced by James Cleverly, who had been the foreign secretary. According to The Guardian, the trigger for her sacking was an article written by her and published in The Times on 8 November 2023, which included a statement that there was "a perception that senior police officers play favourites when it comes to protesters" and were tougher on rightwing extremists than pro-Palestinian "mobs". The Guardian reported that the prime minister's office had asked for changes to be made to the article, but not all were implemented. The Labour Party and some police officers said that Braverman's writing had led to far-right supporters attacking police on 11 November 2023.

===== Seat belt FPN =====
In January 2023, Sunak was issued a fixed penalty notice by Lancashire Constabulary after a social media video of him failing to wear a seat belt in a moving vehicle was published. Sunak apologised for the incident and said he made a "brief error of judgment". It was the second time Sunak got a fixed penalty notice while in government. During his chancellorship in April 2022, he received one in relation to Partygate.

===== Sunak and Starmer's PMQs exchange about transgender rights =====
In February 2024, in response to Keir Starmer's alleged backtracking on "defining a woman" at Prime Minister's Questions, Sunak said that "in fairness, that was only 99% of a U-turn", referring to previous comments made by Starmer that "99.9% of women" do not have a penis. This was said on the same day that the mother of murdered transgender teenager Brianna Ghey was present at the Commons, and was harshly criticised by Starmer, LGBT groups (including Stonewall) and relatives of Ghey. Starmer reacted by deriding Sunak for including that in his answer while Ghey's mother was "in this chamber". In response to Ghey's father's request for an apology, Sunak said it was Starmer's linking the comments to the murder that was "the worst of politics".

Esther Ghey, who was not in the public gallery to hear Sunak's remark, later declined requests for comment adding that she was concentrating on "creating a lasting legacy" for her daughter. Both Sunak and Starmer were criticised. Sunak's response was called a joke by some media outlets, and was criticised by some opposition MPs and Conservatives. Starmer's response was criticised by minister for women and equalities, Kemi Badenoch, who said it showed Labour were "happy to weaponise" Ghey's murder.

== Local election results and opinion polling ==
At the beginning of Sunak's premiership, the Conservatives were trailing the Labour Party by 25 points on average in the polls.

The first by-election of Sunak's premiership, took place on 1 December 2022, in the City of Chester constituency and it resulted in a 13.7% swing from the Conservatives. In December 2022, The Independent published an opinion poll that month which suggested that Sunak could lose his seat if polling results found then were duplicated in a general election.

The 2023 local elections in England were the first local elections of Sunak's premiership, and saw the Conservatives lose over 1,000 councillor seats, with major gains achieved by Labour, the Liberal Democrats, and the Greens. Labour also overtook the Conservatives as holding the highest number of members elected to local government for the first time since 2002.

In July 2023, the Conservatives faced three by-elections. Steve Tuckwell held Uxbridge and South Ruislip for the Conservatives in what was seen as a "referendum on ULEZ expansion". Somerton and Frome was won by the Liberal Democrats. In Selby and Ainsty, Keir Mather of the Labour Party won the seat, setting a record for the largest majority ever overturned by the party in a by-election.

On 19 October 2023, Labour gained two seats in by-elections in Tamworth and Mid Bedfordshire in some of the largest swings from the Conservatives since the prelude to the 1945 general election. In February 2024, Labour gained two seats from the Conservatives in by-elections in Wellingborough and Kingswood. The Wellingborough by-election saw a swing of 28.5% which was the second highest swing from the Conservatives to Labour in a by-election since 1945. In March 2024, the Conservatives recorded their lowest vote share in polling with Ipsos since they began recording the poll in 1978 at 20%, 27 points behind Labour.

In the 2024 local elections, the Conservatives suffered their worst local election defeat since 1996, losing over 500 council seats, and falling to third place in seat count. Andy Street narrowly lost the West Midlands mayoral election to Labour's Richard Parker. Reform UK surpassed the Conservatives in a number of constituencies, but gained only two seats.

== 2024 general election ==
=== 2024 general election ===
On the afternoon of 22 May 2024, Sunak announced that he had asked the King to call a general election for 4 July 2024, surprising his own MPs. Though Sunak had the option to wait until December 2024 to call the election, he said that he decided on the date because he believes that the economy is improving, and that "falling inflation and net migration figures would reinforce the Conservatives' election message of 'sticking to the plan'". While calling the election, Sunak said: "Who do you trust, to turn that foundation into a secure future for you, your family and our country? Now is the moment for Britain to choose its future. To decide whether we want to build on the progress we have made or risk going back to square one with no plan and no certainty."

Sunak's announcement took place during heavy rain at a lectern outside 10 Downing Street, without the use of any shelter from the rain. The D:Ream song "Things Can Only Get Better" (frequently used by the Labour Party in its successful 1997 campaign) was being played loudly in the background by the political activist Steve Bray as Sunak announced the date of the general election. At the beginning of the campaign, Labour had a significant lead in polling over the Conservatives.

Sunak sought to rebuild the Conservative's reputation following a slump in popularity following the short-lived Truss ministry and a slew of controversies including Partygate that irreparably damaged the Second Johnson ministry, through campaigning on stabilising the economy, the Rwanda immigration policy, further strengthening the State Pension, and introducing National Service. He released the Conservative manifesto Clear Plan. Bold Action. Secure Future. on 11 June, addressing the economy, taxes, welfare, expanding free childcare, education, healthcare, environment, energy, transport, and crime.

On 4 July, less than an hour before polls closed, Sunak's government announced the 2024 Dissolution Honours, with life peerages being given to 19 people, including former prime minister Theresa May and Cass Review author Hilary Cass.

=== D-Day controversy ===
Sunak and Starmer attended D-Day commemorations on 6 June 2024, the 80th anniversary. Sunak was heavily criticised for leaving events early to do an interview with ITV, including by veterans. Starmer met with Volodymyr Zelenskyy and King Charles III during the D-Day commemorations, and said that Sunak "has to answer for his actions." Sunak apologised the next day and apologised again on 10 June. He made a final apology on 12 June. Nigel Farage was among those critical of Sunak over his leaving the D-Day events, saying on 7 June that Sunak did not understand "our culture". Conservative and Labour politicians criticised these words as being a racist attack on Sunak, which Farage denied.

=== General election betting scandal ===
On 12 June 2024, it was reported that Conservative candidate and Parliamentary Private Secretary to the Prime Minister, Craig Williams had placed a £100 bet on the date of the election being in July, three days before the date was announced. The bet was referred to the Gambling Commission to determine whether Williams had placed the bet based on confidential information, which could constitute a criminal offence. Williams apologised for the bet, but neither he nor Sunak would answer whether he had inside information.

On 19 June, a police protection officer assigned to Sunak was arrested for betting on the election date. On the same day, it was also announced that Laura Saunders, the Conservative candidate for Bristol North West, was being investigated for betting on the election date. Her husband, Tony Lee, is also being investigated by the Gambling Commission and took a leave of absence from his role as the party's director of campaigning on 19 June.

Over the following two weeks, it was reported that dozens of further Conservative Party-linked officials were being investigated by the Gambling Commission, including Conservative Party's chief data officer, Nick Mason; The Times reported that the investigation was being widened to hundreds of suspicious bets. On 25 June, both Williams and Saunders had their support for their candidacies withdrawn by the Conservative Party.

In April 2025, Williams and 14 others were charged with offences under the Gambling Act 2005.

=== Defeat and resignation ===
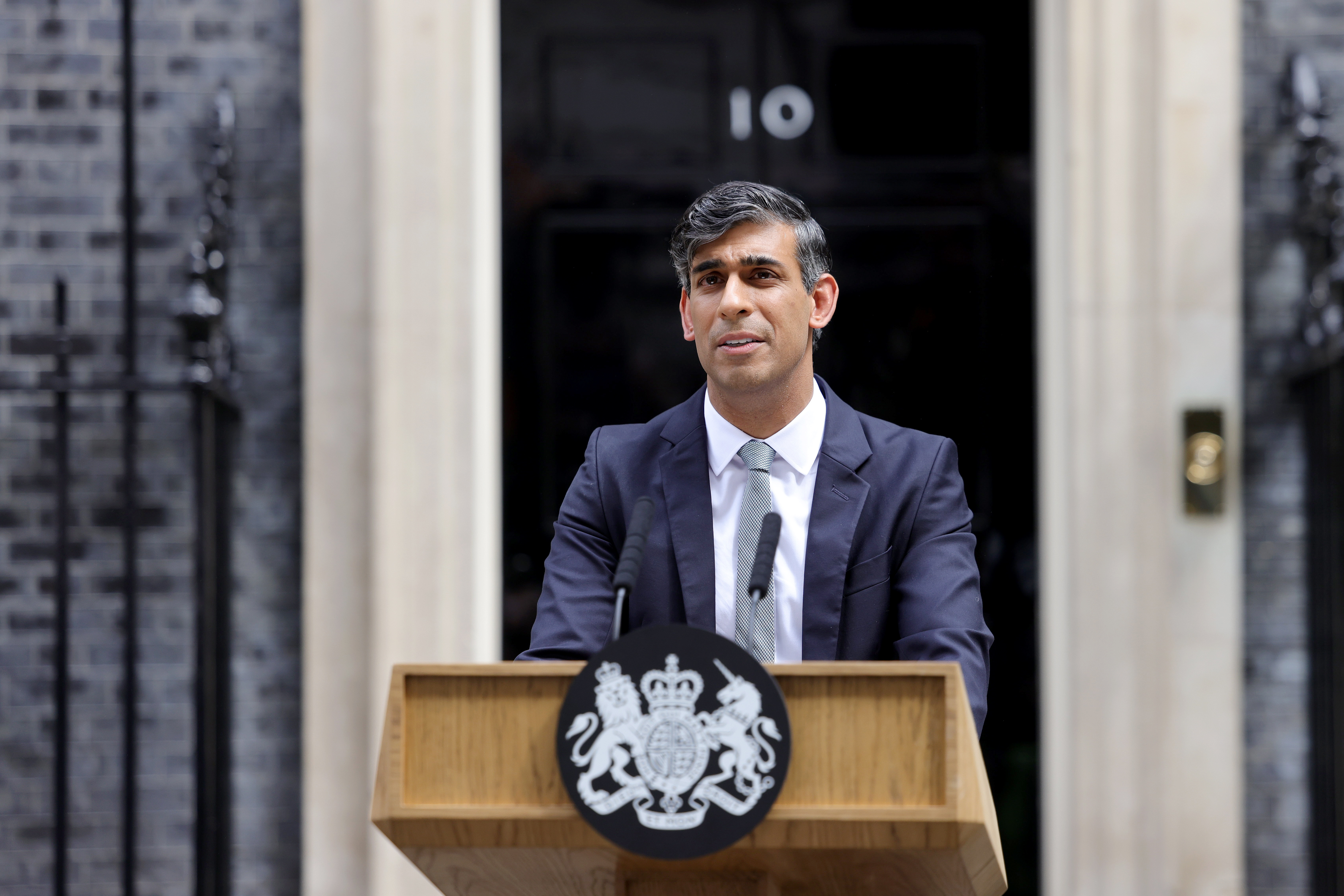
Sunak announcing his resignation outside 10 Downing Street, 5 July 2024

Labour ultimately won the general election, ending 14 years of Conservative government, and Sunak conceded the election on 5 July. The Conservatives experienced the largest defeat in its history, being reduced to 121 seats on a vote share of 23.7 per cent. It lost 244 seats, including those of twelve Cabinet ministers and that of the former prime minister Liz Truss. It also lost all its seats in Wales.

In his resignation speech before tending his resignation to the King, Sunak apologised to Conservative voters and candidates for the party's heavy defeat. He also offered support to Keir Starmer, saying he was "a decent, public-spirited man" he respected and expressed hope he would be successful, saying:

Whilst he has been my political opponent, Sir Keir Starmer will shortly become our Prime Minister. In this job, his successes will be all our successes, and I wish him and his family well. Whatever our disagreements in this campaign, he is a decent, public-spirited man, who I respect. He and his family deserve the very best of our understanding, as they make the huge transition to their new lives behind this door, and as he grapples with this most demanding of jobs in an increasingly unstable world.

After Starmer succeeded Sunak as prime minister, Sunak became Leader of the Opposition and formed a shadow cabinet. He announced his resignation as party leader, saying he would stay as leader until a new leader is elected. Sunak stated during the general election campaign that he intends to remain as a backbench MP for the next 5 years.

== Ministry ==
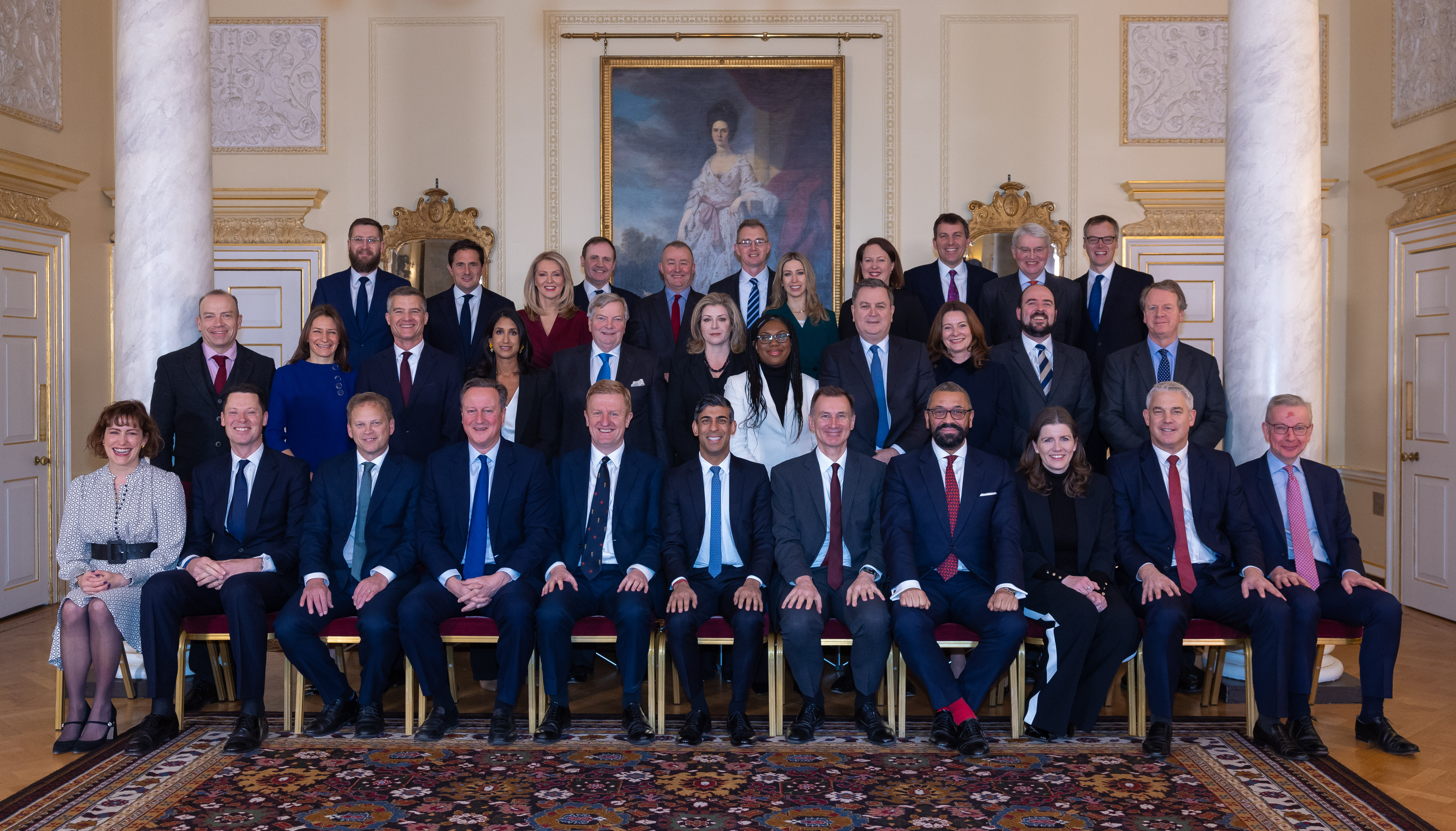
Sunak's cabinet in January 2024

Sunak began appointing his cabinet on 25 October 2022. Jeremy Hunt remained as chancellor, a role he was given during the Truss ministry after Kwasi Kwarteng was dismissed on 14 October. Dominic Raab was also re-appointed as deputy prime minister and justice secretary, both roles he was given during the premiership of Boris Johnson. James Cleverly remained as foreign secretary with Suella Braverman returning as secretary of state for the Home Department, a role from which she had previously resigned during the Truss ministry. Ben Wallace remained as Secretary of State for Defence, a role he had held throughout the Johnson and Truss ministries. Michael Gove returned as Levelling Up Secretary, a role he was dismissed from by Johnson, and Grant Shapps was demoted from home secretary to secretary of state for business, energy and industrial strategy. Penny Mordaunt remained as Leader of the House of Commons and Lord President of the Council, roles which she had held during the Truss ministry.

Other key appointments included Simon Hart as Parliamentary Secretary to the Treasury and chief whip of the House of Commons, Nadhim Zahawi as party chairman, Oliver Dowden as Chancellor of the Duchy of Lancaster, Thérèse Coffey as Environment Secretary, Mel Stride as Work and Pensions Secretary and Mark Harper as transport secretary.

Braverman's reappointment as home secretary in the Sunak ministry was challenged by Labour Party MPs, Liberal Democrats, Scottish National Party MPs and some Conservatives. The Labour leader and Leader of the Opposition, Keir Starmer, raised it as the subject of his first question to Rishi Sunak at Sunak's first Prime Minister's Questions on 26 October 2022. She had previously resigned from her role as home secretary in the Truss ministry during the October 2022 government crisis, in response to criticism about an alleged security breach when she shared secure information with a colleague using her private email account. Sunak said Braverman "made an error of judgment but she recognised that she raised the matter and she accepted her mistake".

=== Reshuffles ===
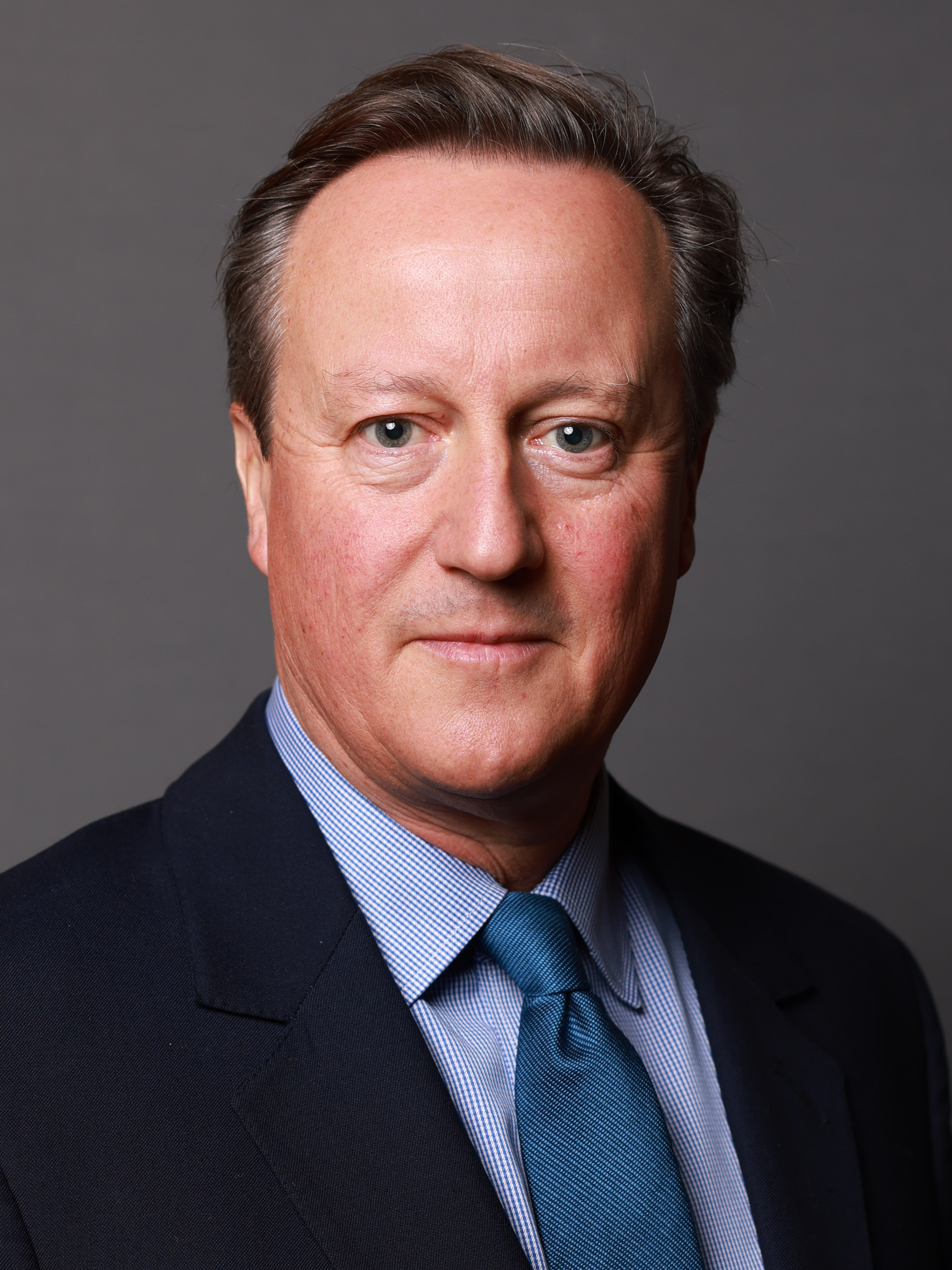
In the November 2023 British cabinet reshuffle, David Cameron returned to frontline politics as foreign secretary, seven years after resigning as prime minister

The first reshuffle saw a significant restructuring of government departments. New departments included those for Business and Trade, Energy Security and Net Zero, and Science, Innovation and Technology. The Department for International Trade and the Department for Business, Energy and Industrial Strategy were split and merged into other departments.

Ministers who joined the cabinet in the first reshuffle included Greg Hands took over as Chairman of the Conservative Party from Nadhim Zahawi and Lucy Frazer became Secretary of State for Culture, Media and Sport taking over from Michelle Donelan. Rachel Maclean left the backbenches and joined the Department for Levelling Up, Housing and Communities.

The second reshuffle saw the return of former prime minister David Cameron to government following a seven-year absence from frontline politics, replacing James Cleverly as foreign secretary. It also saw the departures of Suella Braverman and Therese Coffey from government, and Greg Hands from the cabinet.

==== 2023 August mini-reshuffle ====
On 31 August 2023, Sunak carried out a mini-reshuffle. Ben Wallace resigned as Secretary of State for Defence and was replaced by Secretary of State for Energy Security and Net Zero Grant Shapps. Shapps was replaced by Parliamentary Under-Secretary of State for Children, Families and Wellbeing Claire Coutinho. The new children's minister was announced as backbencher MP David Johnston.

==== 2024 March mini-reshuffle ====
On 26 March 2024, Sunak carried out a mini-reshuffle. Robert Halfon resigned as Minister of State for Skills, Apprenticeships and Higher Education and was replaced by Luke Hall. James Heappey resigned as Minister of State for the Armed Forces and was replaced by Leo Docherty. Nus Ghani was appointed the new Minister of State for Europe in the Foreign, Commonwealth and Development Office. Kevin Hollinrake was promoted to minister of state in the Department for Business and Trade but kept his responsibility for the postal affairs portfolio. Alan Mak was promoted to being a parliamentary Under-Secretary of State jointly in the Department for Business and Trade and the Cabinet Office. As internal appointments to the Conservative Party, backbench MPs Jonathan Gullis and Angela Richardson were made deputy party chairs.

== International prime ministerial trips ==
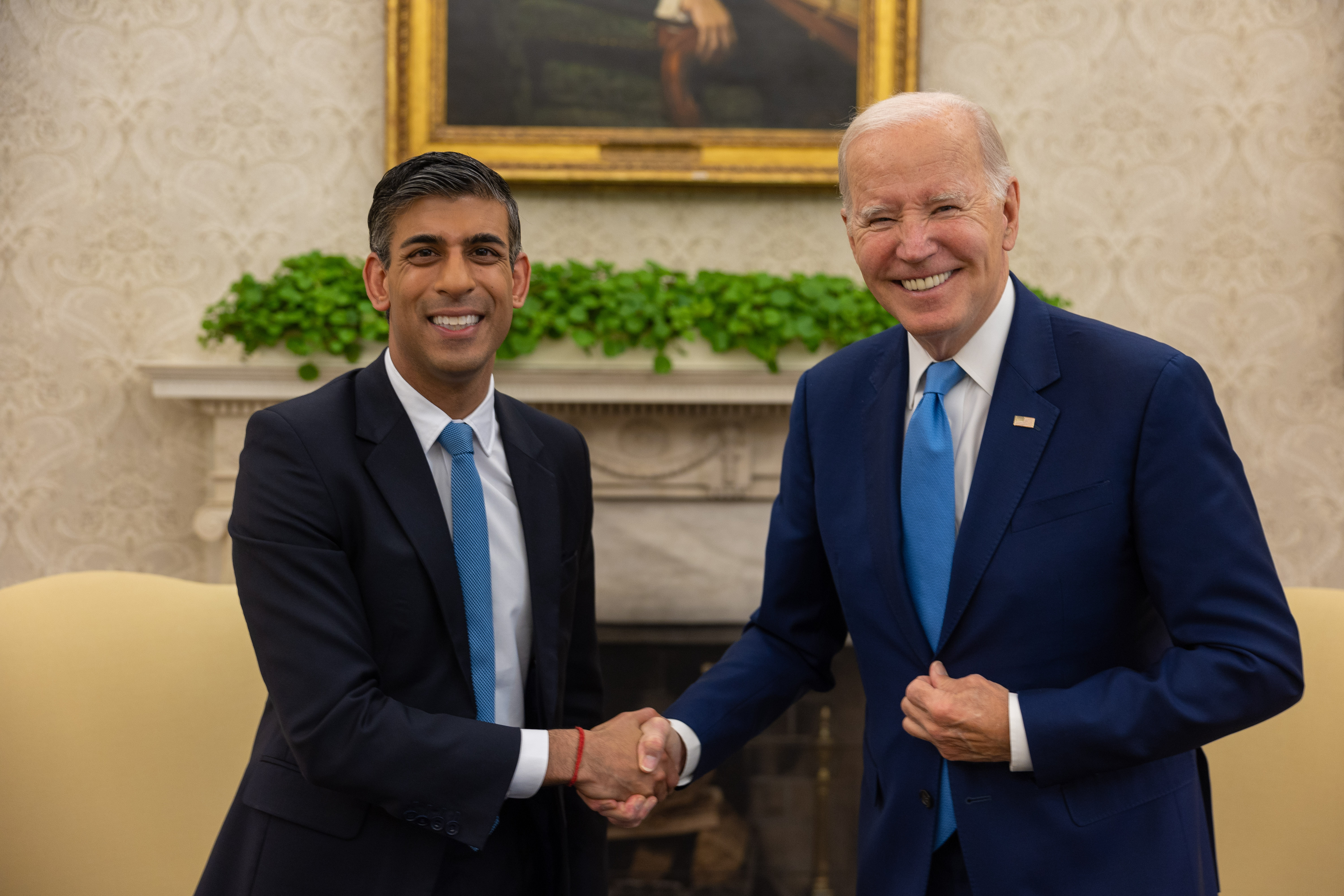
Sunak meets with U.S. president Joe Biden at the White House, 8 June 2023

Sunak made 24 international trips to 22 countries during his premiership. The number of visits per country:

- One visit to Austria, Estonia, Iceland, India, Indonesia, Israel, Japan, Latvia, Lithuania, Moldova, Poland, Saudi Arabia, Spain, Sweden, Switzerland, United Arab Emirates
- Two visits to Egypt, France, Germany, Italy, Ukraine, United States

== Notes ==
British premierships
Preceded by Truss	Sunak premiership 2022–2024	Succeeded by Starmer
