= Matriculation examination =

Final examination before school graduation

A matriculation examination or matriculation exam is a university entrance examination, which is typically held towards the end of secondary school. After passing the examination, a student receives a school leaving certificate recognising academic qualifications from secondary-level education. Depending on scores or grades achieved, a student may then matriculate to university to take up further studies.

The following matriculation examinations are conducted:

- A-levels – in England, Wales, Northern Ireland and several Commonwealth countries
- Abitur – in Germany and Lithuania.
- Iranian University Entrance Exam - in Iran
- Bacalaureat – in Romania and Moldova.
- Baccalauréat – in France and many francophone countries.
- Eindexamen – in the Netherlands.
- Exit examination – in the United States.
  - Regents Exam – New York State, USA
- Gaokao – in China.
- Higher – in Scotland.
- Higher Secondary School Certificate – in Bangladesh, India and Pakistan.
- Hong Kong Diploma of Secondary Education - in Hong Kong
  - Hong Kong Advanced Level Examination - formerly in Hong Kong
- International Baccalaureate Diploma – International.
- ICFES exam – in Colombia
- Leaving Certificate – in Ireland.
  - University of Dublin Matriculation Examination - for Trinity College Dublin
- Matric – in South Africa and formerly in Australia.
- Matura – in Albania, Austria, Bosnia and Herzegovina, Bulgaria, Croatia, Czech Republic, Hungary, Italy, Kosovo, Liechtenstein, North Macedonia, Montenegro, Poland, Serbia, Slovakia, Slovenia, Switzerland and Ukraine.
- Prueba de Selección Universitaria – in Chile
- Student degree – in the Nordic countries.
  - Studentereksamen, Danish student degree.
  - Studentexamen, Swedish student degree (abolished).
  - Generell Studiekompetanse, Norwegian student degree.
  - Stúdentspróf, Icelandic student degree.
  - Studentsprógv, Faroese student degree.
  - Ylioppilastutkinto or Studentexamen, Finnish student degree.
- Bachillerato + Selectividad – in Spain.
- Bagrut – in Israel.
- Tawjihi – in Jordan and the Palestinian territories.
- Riigieksamid — in Estonia.
- Unified State Exam – in Russia.
- Matriculation Examination (Myanmar) – in Myanmar (Burma)
- External independent testing - in Ukraine.
- Unified National Testing - in Kazakhstan.
- General Republican Testing - in Kyrgyzstan.
- Unified State/National Exams - in Armenia and Georgia
- Centralized Testing - in Belarus and Tajikistan
- Unified Tertiary Matriculation Examination- in Nigeria.

== See also ==
- List of secondary school leaving qualifications
- Diploma
- Final examination
- General Educational Development
- Matriculation
