= Education in the Crown Dependencies =

Education in the Crown Dependencies is the responsibility of each of the dependencies having separate systems that are autonomous but dependent on England for models and examples.

For details of education in each dependency, see:

- Education in Guernsey
- Education in Jersey
- Education in the Isle of Man
