= Joint Admission Examination =

Standardized university admission test in Macau

Joint Admission Examination for Macao Four Higher Education Institutions (Languages and Mathematics)
- Acronym: JAE
- Type: Standardized test
- Year started: 2017
- Score range: 350–1000 (excluding special admission programs by the University of Macau)
- Offered: Annually
- Regions: Macau
- Prerequisites: See Eligibility
- Fee: MOP$ 250 per institution
- Used by: Macau: University of Macau, Macao Polytechnic University, Macao Institute for Tourism Studies, and Macau University of Science and Technology
- Website: Joint Admission Examination for Macao Four Higher Education Institutions

The Joint Admission Examination for Macao Four Higher Education Institutions (Languages and Mathematics) (Chinese: 澳門四高校聯合入學考試, Portuguese: Exame Unificado de Acesso às Quatro Instituições do Ensino Superior de Macau (disciplinas de Língua e Matemática)), commonly referred to as the Joint Admission Examination (JAE), is a standardized test jointly organized by four higher education institutions in Macau: the University of Macau, Macao Polytechnic University, Macao Institute for Tourism Studies, and Macau University of Science and Technology. It evaluates candidates' abilities in four subjects: Chinese, Portuguese, English, and mathematics. The exam is not the sole criterion for admission, as each institution considers additional factors based on its unique requirements during the evaluation process.

Additional subjects and interviews are organized and announced separately by each institution. The JAE does not set passing or failing standards, instead providing scores for candidates' reference. The exam is typically held in late March or early April each year.

== Eligibility ==
Candidates must meet one of the following criteria:

- Have completed senior secondary education (Grade 12 or equivalent) and obtained graduation qualifications, or
- Be currently enrolled in senior secondary education (Grade 12 or equivalent), or
- Be at least 23 years old and possess exceptional talents or conditions despite not meeting the above qualifications.

== Sources ==
- University of Macau, Macau, China; Ho, Ally Oi Kuan; Yao, Don; Kunnan, Antony John (2021-04-30). "An analysis of Macau's Joint Admission Examination–English" (PDF). The Journal of AsiaTEFL. 18 (1): 208–222. doi:10.18823/asiatefl.2021.18.1.12.208. ISSN 1738-3102.
- Ho, O. K. (2018). A comparability study between the Joint Admission Examination and the earlier admission examination papers in Macau: A content analysis. Department of English (M.A. thesis). University of Macau.
