= Advanced British Standard =

Proposed educational qualification in England

- Year started: 2033 (estimated)
- Regions: England
- Languages: English language

The Advanced British Standard was a proposed replacement for the system of A-levels and T-levels in England. It was aimed at 16 to 19 year olds, and it accompanied a plan to increase the level of English and Maths taught to this age group.

The proposal was intended to bring together A-Levels and T-Levels into a single new qualification, with students being able to take a wide mix of technical and academic subjects.

The proposal had been announced by Prime Minister Rishi Sunak at the Conservative Party Conference in October 2023. The Conservative government of the time described it as a "Baccalaureate-style qualification". If implemented, the new qualification would have been expected to come into effect around 2033.

It was announced that the government intended to start a consultation in Autumn 2023 to discuss how the qualification should be developed, and that a budget of £600 million had been allocated over two years for the development of the qualification. This would include funding for a tax-free bonus of up to £30,000 over the first five years of their career for teachers in key subjects, with Further Education colleges set to benefit the most from this funding.

The qualification was described as an "undeliverable gimmick" by a Labour Party spokesperson. The Guardian reported that the plan appeared to have emerged from Downing Street, with little or no involvement from the Department for Education, nor the Education secretary Gillian Keegan. Sky News noted that the forthcoming general election created uncertainty about the future of the proposal.

On July 29th 2024, the newly elected Labour government's Chancellor of the Exchequer, Rachel Reeves, announced the proposed qualification was being cancelled with immediate effect, citing budget constraints in place at that time.
