= Eindexamen =

Matriculation exam in the Netherlands

The Eindexamen (Dutch pronunciation: [ˈɛintɛkˌsaːmə(n)], lit. 'End exam' or more precisely 'Final exam') or centraal examen (Dutch pronunciation: [sɛnˈtraːl ˌɛkˈsaː.mə(n)], lit. 'Central exam', abbr. CE) is the matriculation exam in the Netherlands, which takes place in a student's final year of high school education (voortgezet onderwijs; "continued education"). The exam is regulated by the Dutch Secondary Education Act, and the Decree on Central Examination of Secondary Education.

Depending on the level of education (vmbo, havo or vwo), studies leading to the eindexamen typically take either four, five or six years to complete (not including eight years of primary education). Successfully completing the eindexamen grants the student a diploma that certifies their level of education. A vmbo diploma qualifies a student for vocational training (mbo), whereas a havo diploma qualifies them for education at a hogeschool. A vwo diploma is required to pursue studies at a research university.

== Trivia ==
- In 2020, the final examinations got cancelled for the first time since World War II due to the COVID-19 pandemic. Students' grades were solely based on their schoolexamens.

== See also ==
- Education in the Netherlands
