= Educational stage =

Educational stages are subdivisions of formal learning, typically covering early childhood education, primary education, secondary education and tertiary education. The United Nations Educational, Scientific and Cultural Organisation (UNESCO) recognises nine levels of education in its International Standard Classification of Education (ISCED) system (from Level 0 (pre-primary education) through Level 8 (doctoral)). UNESCO's International Bureau of Education maintains a database of country-specific education systems and their stages, published as World Data on Education. Some countries divide levels of study into grades or forms for school children in the same year.

== Organization ==
Education during childhood and early adulthood is typically provided through either a two- or three-stage system of childhood school, followed by additional stages of higher education or vocational education for those who continue their formal education:

- Early childhood education at preschool, nursery school, or kindergarten (outside the U.S. and Canada)
- Primary education at primary school or elementary school, and sometimes in the early years of middle school
- Secondary education at secondary school or high school, and sometimes in the later years of middle school
- Higher education or vocational education

The following table introduces the main concepts, although terms and ages may vary in different places:

| Age | Educational stage | 2-stage system | 3-stage system | ISCED |
|---|---|---|---|---|
| 4–5 | Early childhood education | Preschool | Preschool | 0 |
| 5–6 | Early childhood education | Preschool | Preschool | 0 |
| 6–7 | Primary education | Primary school | Elementary school | 1 |
| 7–8 | Primary education | Primary school | Elementary school | 1 |
| 8–9 | Primary education | Primary school | Elementary school | 1 |
| 9–10 | Primary education | Primary school | Elementary school | 1 |
| 10–11 | Primary education | Primary school | Elementary school | 1 |
| 11–12 | Primary education | Primary school | Middle school | 2 |
| 12–13 | Primary education | Primary school | Middle school | 2 |
| 13–14 | Secondary education | Secondary school | Middle school | 2 |
| 14–15 | Secondary education | Secondary school | Middle school | 2 |
| 15–16 | Secondary education | Secondary school | Middle school | 2 |
| 16–17 | Secondary education | Secondary school | Middle school | 2 |
| 17–18 | Secondary education | Secondary school | High school | 3 |

For additional ISCED stages of education, see ISCED.

Sudbury schools do not use formal grade levels or educational stages. Instead, students ages 4 through 18 are intermingled in a democratic educational system, relying on a series of certifications to use equipment that may require specialised knowledge or safety procedures. These certifications are not typically restricted by age, but rather by demonstrated ability.

== By country ==
=== Australia ===
In Australia, children undergo thirteen years of formal education (plus non-compulsory preschool or kindergarten), usually starting at age 4, 5, or 6 and finishing at age 17, 18, or 19. The years are numbered from "Kindergarten" to 12.

Years in the six Australian states
| Year | Ages | School |
|---|---|---|
| Kindergarten | 3–5 | Preschool |
| Kindergarten (New South Wales) | 4–6 | Primary |
| Pre-primary (Western Australia) | 4–6 | Primary |
| Reception (South Australia) | 4–6 | Primary |
| Prep (Queensland, Tasmania, Victoria) | 4–6 | Primary |
| Grade or Year 1 | 5–7 | Primary |
| Grade or Year 2 | 6–8 | Primary |
| Grade or Year 3 | 7–9 | Primary |
| Grade or Year 4 | 8–10 | Primary |
| Grade or Year 5 | 9–11 | Primary |
| Grade or Year 6 | 10–12 | Primary |
| Grade or Year 7 | 11–13 | Secondary |
| Grade or Year 8 | 12–14 | Secondary |
| Grade or Year 9 | 13–15 | Secondary |
| Grade or Year 10 | 14–16 | Secondary |
| Grade or Year 11 | 15–17 | Secondary |
| Grade or Year 12 | 16–18 | Secondary |

==== Australian Capital Territory ====
In the Australian Capital Territory (ACT), primary school is Kindergarten/years 1–6, high school is years 7–9, and college or Senior Secondary is years 10, 11 & 12 (see table below).

| Year | Ages | School |
|---|---|---|
| Preschool | 3–5 | Preschool |
| Kindergarten | 5–6 | Primary |
| Grade or Year 1 | 6–7 | Primary |
| Grade or Year 2 | 7–8 | Primary |
| Grade or Year 3 | 8–9 | Primary |
| Grade or Year 4 | 9–10 | Primary |
| Grade or Year 5 | 10–11 | Primary |
| Grade or Year 6 | 11–12 | Primary |
| Grade or Year 7 | 12–13 | Secondary (High School) |
| Grade or Year 8 | 13–14 | Secondary (High School) |
| Grade or Year 9 | 14–15 | Secondary (High School) |
| Grade or Year 10 | 15–16 | College or Senior Secondary |
| Grade or Year 11 | 16–17 | College or Senior Secondary |
| Grade or Year 12 | 17–18 | College or Senior Secondary |

==== Northern Territory ====
In the Northern Territory (NT), primary school is Transition/years 1–6, middle school is years 7–9, and high school or Senior Secondary is years 10–12 (see table below).

| Year | Ages | School |
|---|---|---|
| Preschool | 4–5 | Preschool |
| Kindergarten | 5–6 | Preschool |
| Transition | 5–6 | Primary |
| Grade or Year 1 | 6–7 | Primary |
| Grade or Year 2 | 7–8 | Primary |
| Grade or Year 3 | 8–9 | Primary |
| Grade or Year 4 | 9–10 | Primary |
| Grade or Year 5 | 10–11 | Primary |
| Grade or Year 6 | 11–12 | Primary |
| Grade or Year 7 | 12–13 | Secondary (Middle School) |
| Grade or Year 8 | 13–14 | Secondary (Middle School) |
| Grade or Year 9 | 14–15 | Secondary (Middle School) |
| Grade or Year 10 | 15–16 | Senior Secondary (High School) |
| Grade or Year 11 | 16–17 | Senior Secondary (High School) |
| Grade or Year 12 | 17–18 | Senior Secondary (High School) |
| Grade or Year 13 | 18–19 | |
| Grade or Year 14 | 19–20 | |
| Grade or Year 15 | 20 | |

=== Azerbaijan ===
| Azerbaijan Grade | Ages | Correspondent in the U.S |
|---|---|---|
| P1 | 3–4 | Preschool |
| P2 | 4–5 | Pre-kindergarten |

| Azerbaijan Grade | Ages | Correspondent in the U.S |
|---|---|---|
| P3 | 5–6 | Kindergarten |
| P4 | 6–7 | First grade |
| P5 | 7–8 | Second grade |
| P6 | 8–9 | Third grade |
| P7 | 9–10 | Fourth grade |
| P8 | 10–11 | Fifth grade |

| Azerbaijan Grade | Ages | Correspondent in the U.S |
|---|---|---|
| M1 | 11–12 | Sixth grade |
| M2 | 12–13 | Seventh grade |
| M3 | 13–14 | Eighth grade |

| Azerbaijan Grade | Ages | Correspondent in the U.S |
|---|---|---|
| M4 | 14–15 | Ninth grade/Freshmen |
| M5 | 15–16 | Tenth grade/Sophomore |
| DP1 | 16–17 | Eleventh grade/Junior |
| DP2 | 17–18 | Twelfth grade/Senior |

=== Belarus ===
In Belarus, education is guaranteed for everyone. Primary school lasts for 4 years, but some psycho-physically challenged children study for 5 years according to a special standard. Forms 1 to 9 are considered compulsory. After completing general basic school, a person can study in a special establishment to get a job. To enter a higher educational establishment, a person must complete general secondary school (all 11 forms) and pass three centralised tests.

| Year | Ages | School |
|---|---|---|
| Ясли (yasli) (nursery) | 1–2 | Early |
| Детский сад (detskiy sad) (kindergarten) | 3–6 | Early |
| Form 1 | 6–7 | Primary |
| Form 2 | 7–8 | Primary |
| Form 3 | 8–9 | Primary |
| Form 4 | 9–10 | Primary |
| Form 5 | 10–11 | General basic (secondary) |
| Form 6 | 11–12 | General basic (secondary) |
| Form 7 | 12–13 | General basic (secondary) |
| Form 8 | 13–14 | General basic (secondary) |
| Form 9 | 14–15 | General basic (secondary) |
| Form 10 | 15–16 | General secondary (high) |
| Form 11 | 16–17 | General secondary (high) |

=== Brazil ===
In Brazil, there are three levels of basic education: "Educação Infantil" (preschool), "Ensino Fundamental" (primary school) and "Ensino Médio" (high school), which are generally completed by age eighteen. Basic education is designed to provide the necessary minimum knowledge for the exercise of citizenship. It also helps develop awareness of future career choices. In Brazil, after the name of the grade, one may use the names "série" (series) or "ano" (year). The educational stages in Brazil are divided as follows:

| Escola Infantil (Brazil Grade) | Ages | Correspondent in the U.S |
|---|---|---|
| Berçário | 0–1 | Nursery 1 |
| Pré-maternal/Creche | 1–2 | Nursery 2 |
| Maternal/Creche | 2–3 | Nursery 3 |
| 1^{o} período (Primeiro Período) | 3–4 | Kindergarten 1 |
| 2^{o} período (Segundo Período) | 4–5 | Kindergarten 2 |
| 3^{o} período (Terceiro Período) | 5–6 | Kindergarten 3 |

| Ensino Fundamental (Brazil Grade) | Ages | Correspondent in the U.S |
|---|---|---|
| 1^{o} ano (Primeiro Ano) | 6–7 | first grade |
| 2^{o} ano (Segundo Ano) | 7–8 | second grade |
| 3^{o} ano (Terceiro Ano) | 8–9 | third grade |
| 4^{o} ano (Quarto Ano) | 9–10 | fourth grade |
| 5^{o} ano (Quinto Ano) | 10–11 | fifth grade |
| 6^{o} ano (Sexto Ano) | 11–12 | sixth grade |
| 7^{o} ano (Sétimo Ano) | 12–13 | seventh grade |
| 8^{o} ano (Oitavo Ano) | 13–14 | eighth grade |
| 9^{o} ano (Nono Ano) | 14–15 | ninth grade |

| Ensino Médio (Brazil Grade) | Ages | Correspondent in the U.S |
|---|---|---|
| 1^{a} série (Primeira Série) | 15–16 | tenth grade |
| 2^{a} série (Segunda Série) | 16–17 | eleventh grade |
| 3^{a} série (Terceira Série) | 17–18 | twelfth grade |

=== Canada ===
In Canada, schooling officially begins at Kindergarten (or Maternelle in Quebec), followed by grades, with some variations for certain levels in certain provinces/territories. When referred to as a grade, school years are usually referred to by their cardinal number ("Grade Three").

At the post-secondary level in (Anglophone) Canada, a student is usually referred to by the year of study they are in (i.e. First Year, Second Year, etc.). If they are pursuing something higher than an undergraduate degree, the designation usually refers to what year of study they are in since entering Graduate studies (i.e. First Year Graduate Student, etc.). Any student who has completed their first year of undergraduate studies is considered to be an Upper Year Student.

Each province and territory has its own autonomous education system. As such, the name of each level of education and what year each level begins at will vary across the country (as will the curriculum itself).

==== Grade structure by province/territory ====
The following table shows how grades are organized in various provinces. Often, there will be exceptions within each province, both with terminology for groups, and which grades apply to each group.

| Alberta | | Elementary | | | | | | | Junior high | | | Senior high | | | | |
| Alberta | | Kindergarten | 1 | 2 | 3 | 4 | 5 | 6 | 7 | 8 | 9 | 10 | 11 | 12 | | |
| British Columbia | | Elementary | | | | | | | | Secondary | | | | | | |
| British Columbia | | Kindergarten | 1 | 2 | 3 | 4 | 5 | 6 | 7 | 8 | 9 | 10 | 11 | 12 | | |
| Manitoba | | Early years | | | | | Middle years | | | | Senior years | | | | | |
| Manitoba | | Kindergarten | 1 | 2 | 3 | 4 | 5 | 6 | 7 | 8 | 9 | 10 | 11 | 12 | | |
| New Brunswick | | Elementary | | | | | | Middle school | | | High school | | | | | |
| New Brunswick | | Kindergarten | 1 | 2 | 3 | 4 | 5 | 6 | 7 | 8 | 9 | 10 | 11 | 12 | | |
| Newfoundland and Labrador | | Primary | | | | Elementary | | | Junior high | | | Senior high | | | | |
| Newfoundland and Labrador | | Kindergarten | 1 | 2 | 3 | 4 | 5 | 6 | 7 | 8 | 9 | Level I | Level II | Level III | | |
| Northwest Territories | | Primary | | | | Intermediate | | | Junior secondary | | | Senior secondary | | | | |
| Northwest Territories | | Kindergarten | 1 | 2 | 3 | 4 | 5 | 6 | 7 | 8 | 9 | 10 | 11 | 12 | | |
| Nova Scotia | | Elementary | | | | | | | Junior high | | | Senior high | | | | |
| Nova Scotia | | Primary | 1 | 2 | 3 | 4 | 5 | 6 | 7 | 8 | 9 | 10 | 11 | 12 | | |
| Ontario | Elementary | | | | | | | | Intermediate | | Secondary | | | | | |
| Ontario | Junior kindergarten | Kindergarten | 1 | 2 | 3 | 4 | 5 | 6 | 7 | 8 | 9 | 10 | 11 | 12 | | |
| PEI | | | Elementary | | | | | | Intermediate school | | | Senior high | | | | |
| PEI | | Kindergarten | 1 | 2 | 3 | 4 | 5 | 6 | 7 | 8 | 9 | 10 | 11 | 12 | | |
| Quebec | Preschool | | Primary school | | | | | | Secondary school | | | | | Cegep | | |
| Quebec | | Kindergarten | 1 | 2 | 3 | 4 | 5 | 6 | Sec I | Sec II | Sec III | Sec IV | Sec V | first | second | third |
| Saskatchewan | | | Elementary level | | | | | Middle level | | | | Secondary level | | | | |
| Saskatchewan | | Kindergarten | 1 | 2 | 3 | 4 | 5 | 6 | 7 | 8 | 9 | 10 | 11 | 12 | | |
| Yukon | | Elementary | | | | | | | | Secondary | | | | | | |
| Yukon | | Kindergarten | 1 | 2 | 3 | 4 | 5 | 6 | 7 | 8 | 9 | 10 | 11 | 12 | | |

=== China ===
In the People's Republic of China (excluding Hong Kong and Macau), the years are organized in three stages and renumbered within each stage: six years in elementary school (小学) years 1 to 6, then three years in middle school (初级中学, abbreviated 初中) years 7 to 9, then three years in high school (高级中学, abbreviated 高中) years 10 to 12. The first nine years (elementary 1–6 and middle 1–3) are compulsory, and the years in high school are voluntary. Completing higher secondary education or attaining an equivalent level is required before one may receive higher education (高等教育) at universities.

| Year | Ages | Stage |
|---|---|---|
| 1st grade | 6–7 | Elementary |
| 2nd grade | 7–8 | Elementary |
| 3rd grade | 8–9 | Elementary |
| 4th grade | 9–10 | Elementary |
| 5th grade | 10–11 | Elementary |
| 6th grade | 11–12 | Elementary |
| 7th grade | 12–13 | Middle school |
| 8th grade | 13–14 | Middle school |
| 9th grade | 14–15 | Middle school |
| 10th grade | 15–16 | High school |
| 11th grade | 16–17 | High school |
| 12th grade | 17–18 | High school |

=== France ===
Education is compulsory from age 3 to age 16, and then compulsory training until the age of 18. This law was passed during the Macron presidency and approved the law. At the end of the lycée cursus, is the French Baccalaureat exam. It is possible in France to fail a year, and need to repeat (redoubler).

| Age | School | Class | Cycle |
|---|---|---|---|
| From age 3 | Nursery school | TPS: Kindergarten | |
| 3–4 | Nursery school | PS: Preschool class | Cycle I : First learnings |
| 4–5 | Nursery school | MS: Second preschool class | Cycle I : First learnings |
| 5–6 | Nursery school | GS: Pupil in Year 1 | Cycle I : First learnings |
| 6–7 | Grammar school | CP: Pupil in Year 2 | Cycle II : Fundamental learnings |
| 7–8 | Grammar school | CE1: Pupil in Year 3 | Cycle II : Fundamental learnings |
| 8–9 | Grammar school | CE2: Pupil in Year 4 | Cycle II : Fundamental learnings |
| 9–10 | Grammar school | CM1: Pupil in Year 5 | Cycle III : Consolidation |
| 10–11 | Grammar school | CM2: Pupil in Year 6 | Cycle III : Consolidation |
| 11–12 | Junior High school | Sixième (Pupil in Year 7) | Cycle III : Consolidation |
| 12–13 | Junior High school | Cinquième (Pupil in Year 8) | Cycle IV : Deepening |
| 13–14 | Junior High school | Quatrième (Pupil in Year 9) | Cycle IV : Deepening |
| 14–15 | Junior High school | Troisième (Pupil in Year 10) | Cycle IV : Deepening |
| 15–16 | Comprehensive school | Seconde (Pupil in Year 11) | (Cycle V : Senior years) |
| 16–17 | Comprehensive school | Première (Pupil in Year 12) | (Cycle V : Senior years) |
| 17–18 | Comprehensive school | Terminale (Pupil in Year 13) | (Cycle V : Senior years) |

=== Greece ===
Education is compulsory from age 4 to age 15. Education is provided in public and private schools, except Higher Education which is provided only by public universities.

Greece framework
| Grade | Age | Greek designation | Educational stage |
|---|---|---|---|
| Pre-kindergarten | 4–5 | Pre-kindergarten | Preschool |
| Kindergarten | 5–6 | Kindergarten | Preschool |
| First grade | 6–7 | 1st grade | Primary School |
| Second grade | 7–8 | 2nd grade | Primary School |
| Third grade | 8–9 | 3rd grade | Primary School |
| Fourth grade | 9–10 | 4th grade | Primary School |
| Fifth grade | 10–11 | 5th grade | Primary School |
| Sixth grade | 11–12 | 6th grade | Primary School |
| Seventh grade | 12–13 | 1st grade | Gymnasium (Lower secondary school) (US equivalent: Middle school) |
| Eighth grade | 13–14 | 2nd grade | Gymnasium (Lower secondary school) (US equivalent: Middle school) |
| Ninth grade | 14–15 | 3rd grade | Gymnasium (Lower secondary school) (US equivalent: Middle school) |
| Tenth grade | 15–16 | 1st grade | Lyceum (Upper secondary school) (US equivalent: High school) |
| Eleventh grade | 16–17 | 2nd grade | Lyceum (Upper secondary school) (US equivalent: High school) |
| Twelfth grade | 17–18 | 3rd grade | Lyceum (Upper secondary school) (US equivalent: High school) |

=== Hong Kong ===
The Hong Kong system was based on the United Kingdom system, with zero to three optional years at kindergarten, six years of primary school (小學) and six years of secondary school (中學), followed by four years at university. Primary 1–6 (小一 – 小六) corresponds to Years 1–6 in the UK, and Forms 1 – 6 (中一 – 中六) correspond to Years 7–12. Usually students begin Primary 1 at age 5 or 6 and complete Form 6 at age 17 or 18.

In Hong Kong, international schools follow the system of the country they are based upon, for example the English Schools Foundation uses the UK year system, and the French International School of Hong Kong uses the French école, collège, lycée system. Also, the English term form followed by the English number is common usage even in otherwise Cantonese conversations.

| Year | Ages | Stage |
|---|---|---|
| Primary 1 | 6–7 | Primary |
| Primary 2 | 7–8 | Primary |
| Primary 3 | 8–9 | Primary |
| Primary 4 | 9–10 | Primary |
| Primary 5 | 10–11 | Primary |
| Primary 6 | 11–12 | Primary |
| Secondary 1 | 12–13 | Secondary |
| Secondary 2 | 13–14 | Secondary |
| Secondary 3 | 14–15 | Secondary |
| Secondary 4 | 15–16 | Secondary |
| Secondary 5 | 16–17 | Secondary |
| Secondary 6 | 17–18 | Secondary |

=== India ===
The central and main state boards uniformly follow the "10+2+3" pattern of education. In this pattern, study of ten years is done in schools and two years in Junior colleges, and then three years of graduation for a bachelor's degree. The first ten years are further subdivided into four years of primary education followed by six years of High School. This pattern originated from the recommendation of the Education Commission of 1964–66.

==== Pre-Primary education ====
- Play group (pre-nursery): At play schools, children are exposed to a lot of basic learning activities that help them to get independent faster and develop their self-help qualities like eating food themselves, dressing up, and maintaining cleanliness. The age limit for admission into pre-nursery is 2 to 3 years
- Nursery: Nursery level activities help children unfold their talents, thus enabling them to sharpen their mental and physical abilities. The age limit for admission in nursery is 3 to 4 years.
- LKG: It is also called the Junior Kindergarten (Jr. kg) stage. The age limit for admission in LKG is 4 to 5 years.
- UKG: It is also called the Senior Kindergarten (Sr. kg) stage. The age limit for admission in UKG is 5 to 6 years.

==== Primary education ====
The Indian government lays emphasis on primary education, also referred to as elementary education, to children aged 6 to 14 years old. Because education laws are given by the states, duration of primary school visit alters between the Indian states. The Indian government has also banned child labour in order to ensure that the children do not enter unsafe working conditions. However, both free education and the ban on child labour are difficult to enforce due to economic disparity and social conditions. 80% of all recognised schools at the elementary stage are government run or supported, making it the largest provider of education in the country.

==== Secondary education ====
Secondary education covers children aged 12 to 18, a group comprising 8.85 crore children according to the 2001 Census of India. The final two years of secondary is often called Higher Secondary (HS), Senior Secondary, or simply the "+2" stage. The two halves of secondary education are each an important stage for which a pass certificate is needed, and thus are affiliated by central boards of education under HRD ministry, before one can pursue higher education, including college or professional courses.

UGC, NCERT, CBSE and CISCE directives state qualifying ages for candidates who wish to take board exams. Those at least 15 years old by 30 May for a given academic year are eligible to appear for Secondary board exams, and those 17 by the same date are eligible to appear for Higher Secondary certificate board exams. It further states that upon successful completion of Higher Secondary, one can apply to higher education under UGC control such as Engineering, Medical, and Business Administration.

==== New education policy 2020 ====
India in 29 July approved a new education policy in order to replace the previous education system to an advanced education system. The new policy aims for universalisation of education from pre-school to secondary level with 100 per cent Gross Enrolment Ratio (GER) in school education by 2030 and aims to raise GER in higher education to 50 per cent by 2025.

Key points:
The policy also proposes phasing out of all institutions offering single streams and that all universities and colleges must aim to become multidisciplinary by 2040.

- Grade division and structure

Introducing 3 years of pre-schooling, the National Education Policy 2020 has taken a similar approach like Cambridge and IB, which also offer dedicated Primary Year Programs.

Dismantling the age-old 10+2 concept, the policy pitches for a "5+3+3+4" design corresponding to the age groups 3–8 years (foundational stage), 8–11 (preparatory), 11–14 (middle), and 14–18 (secondary). This brings early childhood education (also known as pre-school education for children of ages 3 to 5) under the umbrella of formal schooling.

- School curriculum and pedagogy

According to the National Education Policy 2020, the school curriculum and pedagogy will aim for the holistic development of learners by equipping them with the key 21st-century skills. Additionally, it also aims for reduction in the syllabus to enhance essential learning and critical thinking.

- Languages

The policy advocates for mother-tongue/local language/regional language as the medium of instruction at least till grade 5, but preferably till Grade 8 and beyond.

Sanskrit will now be offered at all levels of school and higher education as an option for students including the 3-language formula. Other classical languages and literature of India also to be available as options. In non-Hindi states of India, students will be served as a Hindi alternative, students will have to choose between Hindi and Sanskrit. Tamil, Telugu, Bengali, Punjabi, etc. languages will also be emphasized under NEP2020.

Foreign languages will also be offered to students. Languages like Japanese, Korean, Russian, etc. will be introduced to them in their secondary school. They can opt for any language they want to learn. The step has been taken to embrace global culture and emphasize a multilingualism approach.

- Others

The NEP proposes sweeping changes including opening up of Indian higher education to foreign universities, dismantling of the UGC and the All India Council for Technical Education (AICTE), introduction of a four-year multidisciplinary undergraduate programme with multiple exit options, and discontinuation of the M Phil programme.

In school education, the policy focuses on overhauling the curriculum, "easier" Board exams, a reduction in the syllabus to retain "core essentials" and thrust on "experiential learning and critical thinking".

The policy also proposes phasing out of all institutions offering single streams and that all universities and colleges must aim to become multidisciplinary by 2040.

=== Indonesia ===
In Indonesia, children spend 12 years of formal education, but some children attend nursery playgroup (called Kelompok Belajar in 2 years) and attend kindergarten (Called Taman Kanak-Kanak in 2 years).

| Age | Stage | School | Year |
|---|---|---|---|
| 2–3 | Pre-school | Kelompok Belajar (KB) (Nursery Playgroup) | KB-A/KBJ |
| 3–4 | Pre-school | Kelompok Belajar (KB) (Nursery Playgroup) | KB-B/KBS |
| 4–5 | Pre-school | Taman Kanak-kanak (TK) (Kindergarten) | TK-A |
| 5–6 | Pre-school | Taman Kanak-kanak (TK) (Kindergarten) | TK-B |
| 6–7 | Primary School | Sekolah Dasar (SD) (Elementary School) | Kelas 1 |
| 7–8 | Primary School | Sekolah Dasar (SD) (Elementary School) | Kelas 2 |
| 8–9 | Primary School | Sekolah Dasar (SD) (Elementary School) | Kelas 3 |
| 9–10 | Primary School | Sekolah Dasar (SD) (Elementary School) | Kelas 4 |
| 10–11 | Primary School | Sekolah Dasar (SD) (Elementary School) | Kelas 5 |
| 11–12 | Primary School | Sekolah Dasar (SD) (Elementary School) | Kelas 6 |
| 12–13 | Secondary School | Sekolah Menengah Pertama (SMP) (Junior High School) | Kelas 7 |
| 13–14 | Secondary School | Sekolah Menengah Pertama (SMP) (Junior High School) | Kelas 8 |
| 14–15 | Secondary School | Sekolah Menengah Pertama (SMP) (Junior High School) | Kelas 9 |
| 15–16 | Secondary School | Sekolah Menengah Atas (SMA) (Senior High School) | Kelas 10 |
| 16–17 | Secondary School | Sekolah Menengah Atas (SMA) (Senior High School) | Kelas 11 |
| 17–18 | Secondary School | Sekolah Menengah Atas (SMA) (Senior High School) | Kelas 12 |

=== Iran ===
The Iranian system has experienced several changes in the last seven to eight decades. Prior to 1940–1950, the education system had consisted of three levels, called in order: an optional year in kindergarten, six years of primary school, finally followed by six years of secondary school ending up with a diploma. After some improvements during Mohammad Reza Shah Pahlavi, the system was changed to four consecutive periods: two optional years in kindergarten and pre-primary school, primary school consisting of 5 years, 3 years in middle school, and finally four years in high school. The system ended up by honoring a diploma in certain majors, e.g. math and physics.

Around 1996–1997, one year was reduced from the entire education system and one was honored with a diploma after three years in high school. However, if one would have liked to continue her/his education towards university degrees, one would have been required to take the last year, so called pre-university year. This year had been a requirement to participate in the Iranian University Entrance Exam for high school students. Again, around 2012, the system turned back to its previous system, consisting of two 6-year periods.

There are two formal stages of education in Iran: primary school (دبستان, Dabestãn) and high school (دبیرستان, Dabirestãn). The high school itself is broken into 2 parts: A and B. Preschool educations are informal, therefore Grade 1 is the first year. In Grade 1 (پایه‌ی 1, Paye 1) also known as the 1st class (کلاس اوّل, Klãs Avval), children learn the basics of reading and writing.

| Stage | School | Age |
|---|---|---|
| Preschool | Kindergarten | 3–6 |
| Primary school | Grade 1 | 7 |
| Primary school | Grade 2 | 7–8 |
| Primary school | Grade 3 | 8–9 |
| Primary school | Grade 4 | 9–10 |
| Primary school | Grade 5 | 10–11 |
| Primary school | Grade 6 | 11–12 |
| High school first term | Grade 7 | 12–13 |
| High school first term | Grade 8 | 13–14 |
| High school first term | Grade 9 | 14–15 |
| High school second term | Grade 10 | 15–16 |
| High school second term | Grade 11 | 16–17 |
| High school second term | Grade 12 | 17–18 |

=== Ireland ===
In the Republic of Ireland, there are two levels of compulsory education; primary school (ca.4–12 years of age) and secondary school (ca.12–18 years). The names of each class are as follows:

- Junior Infants (4–5 years)
- Senior Infants (5–6 years)
- First Class (6–7 years)
- Second Class (7–8 years)
- Third Class (8–9 years)
- Fourth Class (9–10 years)
- Fifth Class (10–11 years)
- Sixth Class (11–12 years)

After Sixth Class, students move to secondary school, entering;

- First Year (12–13 years)
- Second Year (13–14 years)
- Third Year (14–15 years) – Junior Certificate
- Fourth Year [or Transition Year] (15–16 years)
- Fifth Year (15–17 years)
- Sixth Year [or Final Year] (16–18 years) – Leaving Certificate

In some schools, Transition Year is compulsory, in others it is optional.

=== Italy ===
In Italy, education is compulsory from the age of 6 to the age of 16. On parents' demand, children can start the Scuola primaria (see below) one year earlier.

Educazione Infantile:

- Asilo nido: 3 months – 3 years
- Scuola d'infanzia: 3 years – 5 years

Scuola primaria (informally: Scuola Elementare):

- I elementare: 6–7
- II elementare: 7–8
- III elementare: 8–9
- IV elementare: 9–10
- V elementare: 10–11

Scuola secondaria di primo grado (informally: Scuola Media):

- I media – 11–12
- II media – 12–13
- III media – 13–14

Scuola secondaria di secondo grado (informally: Scuola Superiore):

- biennio
  - I superiore – 14–15
  - II superiore – 15–16
- triennio
  - III superiore – 16–17
  - IV superiore – 17–18
  - V superiore – 18–19

=== Japan ===
In Japan, the years are organized in three stages and renumbered within each stage: six years in elementary school (小学校, shōgakkō) years 1 to 6, then three years in lower secondary (中学校, chūgakkō) years 1 to 3, then three years in higher secondary (高等学校, kōtōgakkō, abbreviated 高校, kōkō) years 1 to 3. The first nine years (elementary 1–6 and lower secondary 1–3) are compulsory, and the years in higher secondary school are voluntary. Completing higher secondary education or attaining an equivalent level is required before one may receive higher education at universities (大学, daigaku).

| Year | Ages | Stage |
|---|---|---|
| Year 1 | 6–7 | Elementary |
| Year 2 | 7–8 | Elementary |
| Year 3 | 8–9 | Elementary |
| Year 4 | 9–10 | Elementary |
| Year 5 | 10–11 | Elementary |
| Year 6 | 11–12 | Elementary |
| Year 1 | 12–13 | Lower secondary |
| Year 2 | 13–14 | Lower secondary |
| Year 3 | 14–15 | Lower secondary |
| Year 1 | 15–16 | Higher secondary |
| Year 2 | 16–17 | Higher secondary |
| Year 3 | 17–18 | Higher secondary |

=== Macau ===
| Typical age | Grade/Level | Curriculum Stages | | Schools | |
|---|---|---|---|---|---|
| 3-4 | N/A | Infant Education 幼兒教育; Pré-escolar | | Kindergarten 幼稚園; Jardim de infância | |
| 4-5 | N/A | Infant Education 幼兒教育; Pré-escolar | | Kindergarten 幼稚園; Jardim de infância | |
| 5-6 | N/A | Infant Education 幼兒教育; Pré-escolar | | Kindergarten 幼稚園; Jardim de infância | |
| 6—7 | Primary 1 | Primary Education 小學教育; Ensino primário | | Primary School 小學; Escola primária | |
| 7—8 | Primary 2 | Primary Education 小學教育; Ensino primário | | Primary School 小學; Escola primária | |
| 8—9 | Primary 3 | Primary Education 小學教育; Ensino primário | | Primary School 小學; Escola primária | |
| 9—10 | Primary 4 | Primary Education 小學教育; Ensino primário | | Primary School 小學; Escola primária | |
| 10—11 | Primary 5 | Primary Education 小學教育; Ensino primário | | Primary School 小學; Escola primária | |
| 11—12 | Primary 6 | Primary Education 小學教育; Ensino primário | | Primary School 小學; Escola primária | |
| 12—13 | Form 1 | Junior Secondary Education 初中教育; Ensino secundário-geral | | Junior Secondary School 初中; Escola secundária geral | |
| 13—14 | Form 2 | Junior Secondary Education 初中教育; Ensino secundário-geral | | Junior Secondary School 初中; Escola secundária geral | |
| 14—15 | Form 3 | Junior Secondary Education 初中教育; Ensino secundário-geral | | Junior Secondary School 初中; Escola secundária geral | |
| 15—16 | Form 4 | Senior Secondary Education 高中教育; Ensino secundário-complementar | Vocational and Technical Education 職業技術教育; Ensino técnico-profissional | Senior Secondary School 高中; Escola secundária complementar | Vocational School 職業技術學校; Escola técnico-profissional |
| 16—17 | Form 5 | Senior Secondary Education 高中教育; Ensino secundário-complementar | Vocational and Technical Education 職業技術教育; Ensino técnico-profissional | Senior Secondary School 高中; Escola secundária complementar | Vocational School 職業技術學校; Escola técnico-profissional |
| 17—18 | Form 6 | Senior Secondary Education 高中教育; Ensino secundário-complementar | Vocational and Technical Education 職業技術教育; Ensino técnico-profissional | Senior Secondary School 高中; Escola secundária complementar | Vocational School 職業技術學校; Escola técnico-profissional |

=== Malaysia ===
Compulsory education in Malaysia spans a period of 11 years and comprises both primary and secondary education. Kindergarten is optional.

Malaysian primary school consists of six years of education, referred to as Year 1 to Year 6 (formerly Standard 1 to Standard 6). Year 1–3 are classified as Level One (Tahap Satu in Malay) while Year 4–6 make up Level Two (Tahap Dua). Primary schooling usually begins at the age of 7 and ends at 12. Students take their first national examination, the UPSR, towards the end of the Year 6 school year. Performance in the UPSR has no effect on their resuming schooling; all students continue with their secondary education after leaving primary school.

Secondary schooling usually begins at age 13. Secondary schools offer education for a total of five years, starting with Form 1 and finishing at Form 5. Forms 1–3 are grouped together into the "Lower Form" and Forms 4 and 5 are considered the "Upper Form". Students in Form 3 will have to sit for their second national exam, the PT3. They are then streamed into sciences or humanities classes for the Upper Form according to their performance in this exam. At age 17 students in Form 5 sit for the final level of national examinations, the SPM (Malaysian Certificate of Education). Achieving a passing grade in the Bahasa Melayu (Malay Language) portion of the exams is compulsory; failure results in an automatic failing grade for all subjects taken in the examination and the student is held back to repeat Form 5. Completion of the examination signifies that the student has completed formal education in Malaysia; an SPM certificate remains the base requirement to secure most jobs in Malaysia.

After the SPM, students have a choice of either continuing with Form 6 (which comprises 2 years, Lower and Upper Six) or entering matriculation (pre-university programs). If they opt for Form 6, they will be required to take the STPM examination. Although generally taken by those desiring to attend public universities in Malaysia, an STPM certification is internationally recognized and may also be used, though rarely required, to enter private local universities for undergraduate courses. In recent years, the Ministry of Education has also promoted digital learning platforms such as the Integrated Digital Learning Platform (IDME KPM) to enhance access to online educational resources in Malaysia.

Educational stages in Malaysia
| Year | Ages | School |
|---|---|---|
| Kindergarten (optional) | 4–6 | Preschool |
| Tahun 1 (Year 1) | 6–7 | Tahap Satu (Level One or Lower Primary) |
| Tahun 2 (Year 2) | 7–8 | Tahap Satu (Level One or Lower Primary) |
| Tahun 3 (Year 3) | 8–9 | Tahap Satu (Level One or Lower Primary) |
| Tahun 4 (Year 4) | 9–10 | Tahap Dua (Level Two or Higher Primary) |
| Tahun 5 (Year 5) | 10–11 | Tahap Dua (Level Two or Higher Primary) |
| Tahun 6 (Year 6) | 11–12 | Tahap Dua (Level Two or Higher Primary) |
| Tingkatan 1 (Form 1) | 12–13 | Menengah Rendah (Lower Secondary) |
| Tingkatan 2 (Form 2) | 13–14 | Menengah Rendah (Lower Secondary) |
| Tingkatan 3 (Form 3) | 14–15 | Menengah Rendah (Lower Secondary) |
| Tingkatan 4 (Form 4) | 15–16 | Menengah Atas (Upper Secondary) |
| Tingkatan 5 (Form 5) | 16–17 | Menengah Atas (Upper Secondary) |
| Tingkatan 6 (Form 6) (optional) | 17–18 | Pre-university programme |

=== Mexico ===
In Mexico, grades 1 through 12 can be divided into two stages: Educación Básica, and Educación Media Superior. Educación Básica covers pre-primary education to the equivalent of ninth grade. Educación Media Superior covers tenth through twelfth grade, and students' levels are identified by their current semester, not by their grade.

| | Year | Ages | School |
|---|---|---|---|
| Educación Básica | | 3 – 5/6 | Preescolar / Kinder |
| Educación Básica | Primer grado (1^{o}) | 6/7 | Primaria |
| Educación Básica | Segundo grado (2^{o}) | 7/8 | Primaria |
| Educación Básica | Tercer grado (3^{o}) | 8/9 | Primaria |
| Educación Básica | Cuarto grado (4^{o}) | 9/10 | Primaria |
| Educación Básica | Quinto grado (5^{o}) | 10/11 | Primaria |
| Educación Básica | Sexto grado (6^{o}) | 11/12 | Primaria |
| Educación Básica | Primero de secundaria | 12/13 | Secundaria |
| Educación Básica | Segundo de secundaria | 13/14 | Secundaria |
| Educación Básica | Tercero de secundaria | 14/15 | Secundaria |
| Educación Media Superior | Primer semestre, and Segundo semestre | 15/16 | Bachillerato / Preparatoria |
| Educación Media Superior | Tercer semestre, and Cuarto semestre | 16/17 | Bachillerato / Preparatoria |
| Educación Media Superior | Quinto semestre, and Sexto semestre | 17/18 | Bachillerato / Preparatoria |

=== Nepal ===
In Nepal, the stages of education are primary education, secondary education, and higher secondary. Pre-primary education is also found in some areas. Generally, the pre-primary level covers nursery and kindergarten. Primary education consists of grades one through five, while lower secondary education covers grades six through eight and secondary education covers grades nine through ten. Higher secondary covers grades eleven and twelve. Students get Secondary Education Examination certificate in grade ten. According to the new Education Act, the national grade 12 Examination will result in the School Leaving Certificate (SLC).

| Year | Ages | School |
|---|---|---|
| Nursery | 3–4 | Preschool |
| Kindergarten | 4–5 | Preschool |
| Year 1 | 5–6 | Primary |
| Year 2 | 6–7 | Primary |
| Year 3 | 7–8 | Primary |
| Year 4 | 8–9 | Primary |
| Year 5 | 9–10 | Primary |
| Year 6 | 10–11 | Lower secondary |
| Year 7 | 11–12 | |
| Year 8 | 12–13 | |
| Year 9 | 13–14 | Junior higher secondary |
| Year 10 | 14–16 | Junior higher secondary |
| Year 11 | 15–17 | Senior higher secondary |
| Year 12 | 16–18 | Senior higher secondary |

=== New Zealand ===
In New Zealand children are required by law to attend 10 years of educational instruction, from the age of 6 to 16. The law also provides in the same legislation that all people are allowed to attend free education to the age of 18, this legislation is the Education Act 1989. Children can be enrolled at primary school when they turn five years old, and must be enrolled by the time they turn six years old. From years 1–6 students attend primary school. In years 7 and 8 students attend intermediate, or a joint school (years 1–8 or years 7–13). The final years of free education are spent in secondary school (years 9–13). New Zealand also has two older educational stage-numbering systems; standards 5 and 6 were largely unused with the introduction of intermediate schools in the 1950s, while "primmer" numbering was in use well into the 1970s, and some academically focused secondary schools still use "form" numbering.

| Year level | Ages | Old systems | | School |
|---|---|---|---|---|
| 0 | 5 (if born after March) | | | Primary school |
| 1 | 5–6 | Junior 1 | Primmers 1, 2 & 3 | Primary school |
| 2 | 6–7 | Junior 2 | Primmers 3 & 4 | Primary school |
| 3 | 7–8 | Standard 1 | | Primary school |
| 4 | 8–9 | Standard 2 | | Primary school |
| 5 | 9–10 | Standard 3 | | Primary school |
| 6 | 10–11 | Standard 4 | | Primary school |
| 7 | 11–12 | Form 1 | Standard 5 | Intermediate school (some primary schools and secondary schools also offer these year levels) |
| 8 | 12–13 | Form 2 | Standard 6 | Intermediate school (some primary schools and secondary schools also offer these year levels) |
| 9 | 13–14 | Form 3 | | Secondary school |
| 10 | 14–15 | Form 4 | | Secondary school |
| 11 | 15–16 | Form 5 | | Secondary school |
| 12 | 16–17 | Form 6 | | Secondary school |
| 13 | 17–18 | Form 7 | | Secondary school |

=== Nigeria ===
In Nigeria children start school at the age of 6.This age marks the beginning of compulsory primary education, which lasts until around age 11.

| Grade | Age | School | Stage |
|---|---|---|---|
| Daycare | 0-5 | none | none |
| Kindergarten | 5-6 | Preschool | Primary school |
| First grade | 6-7 | Primary school | Primary school |
| Second grade | 7-8 | Primary school | Primary school |
| Third grade | 8-9 | Primary school | Primary school |
| Fourth grade | 9-10 | Primary school | Primary school |
| Fifth grade | 10-11 | Primary school | Primary school |
| Sixth grade | 11-12 | Primary school | Primary school |
| Seventh grade | 12-13 | Secondary school | Secondary school |
| Eighth grade | 13-14 | Secondary school | Secondary school |
| Ninth grade | 14-15 | Secondary school | Secondary school |
| Tenth grade | 15-16 | Secondary school | Secondary school |
| Eleventh grade | 16-17 | Secondary school | Secondary school |
| Twelfth grade | 17-18 | Secondary school | Secondary school |

=== Norway ===
In Norway children start school at the age of six; before that kindergarten is voluntary. This school is called barneskole (childrenschool):

- 6–7: First grade
- 7–8: Second grade
- 8–9: Third grade
- 9–10: Fourth grade
- 10–11: Fifth grade
- 11–12: Sixth grade
- 12–13: Seventh grade

The second school is ungdomsskole (youth-school). At this level the students are rated with grades in each subject, in addition to behavior and orderliness:

- 13–14: Eighth grade
- 14–15: Ninth grade
- 15–16: Tenth grade

The last school before higher education is called videregående skole (ongoing school) and is voluntary, though most choose to attend. At this level students decide among separate career-related schools. The most popular such school is designed to prepare one for further education, while others prepare students for such as mechanics, electricians, cooks and so on. Educational stages in these schools begin again at "one" and are named Vg1, Vg2, Vg3 and Vg4. Some of the more practical schools last only two years, and some students may choose to attend an extra year to study higher education. The typical duration is three years, though some schools offer a four-year program to enable students to engage in more athletics or gather real work experience.

- 16–17: Vg1
- 17–18: Vg2
- 18–19: Vg3
- 19–20: Vg4

=== Philippines ===
From May 28, 1945 to 2017, there were ten years of compulsory education under the K–4th Year system until it phased out entirely on June 5, 2017. Grades 11 and 12 were added on June 13, 2016, as a result of the K–12 implementation that began on May 20, 2008 mandated by Omnibus Education Reform Act of 2008 and later ASEAN Charter on December 15, 2008, and became effective as part of the 9-year process on April 24, 2012. School years start in the first or second week of June, and end in the last week of March or first week of April. There are three stages of education in the Philippines – elementary school, junior high school, and senior high school.

Philippine educational system implemented since May 20, 2008 Effective: April 24, 2012
| Grade | Age | School | Stage |
|---|---|---|---|
| Kindergarten | 4–6 | Preschool | Elementary school |
| Grade 1 | 5–7 | Primary school | Elementary school |
| Grade 2 | 6–8 | Primary school | Elementary school |
| Grade 3 | 7–9 | Primary school | Elementary school |
| Grade 4 | 8–10 | Primary school | Elementary school |
| Grade 5 | 9–11 | Primary school | Elementary school |
| Grade 6 | 10–12 | Primary school | Elementary school |
| Grade 7 (freshman) | 11–13 | Secondary school | Junior high school |
| Grade 8 (sophomore) | 12–14 | Secondary school | Junior high school |
| Grade 9 (junior) | 13–15 | Secondary school | Junior high school |
| Grade 10 (senior) | 14–16 | Secondary school | Junior high school |
| Grade 11 (penultimate) | 15–17 | Secondary school | Senior high school |
| Grade 12 (ultimate) | 16–18 | Secondary school | Senior high school |

=== Poland ===
From 1998 to 2019, the Polish education system was divided into six years of primary education, followed by three years of secondary education and three or four years of optional high school education. Attending general education secondary school or vocational school allows graduates to attend university while attending a basic vocational school (zasadnicza szkoła zawodowa) requires its graduates to attend supplementary liceums if they wish to proceed with university education. Since 2019, the three stages were merged into two, returning to the country's pre-reform system. Kindergarten education is optional, while compulsory education starts with year 0. The school year lasts from early September to late June, with the exception of the final year of high school, which ends in late April, followed by matura exams throughout May.
The "Age" column represents the age at which children start a school year.

| Grade | Age | School | |
| Grade | Age | Up to 1998 and again since 2019 | 1998–2019 (gimnazjum reform) |
|---|---|---|---|
| Kindergarten | 3–5 | Preschool | Preschool |
| Grade 0 (zerówka) | 5–6 | Preschool | Preschool |
| Grade 1 | 6–7 | Primary school | Primary school |
| Grade 2 | 7–8 | Primary school | Primary school |
| Grade 3 | 8–9 | Primary school | Primary school |
| Grade 4 | 9–10 | Primary school | Primary school |
| Grade 5 | 10–11 | Primary school | Primary school |
| Grade 6 | 11–12 | Primary school | Primary school |
| Grade 7 | 12–13 | Primary school | Gimnazjum |
| Grade 8 | 13–14 | Primary school | Gimnazjum |
| Grade 1 | 14–15 | Secondary school | Gimnazjum |
| Grade 2 | 15–16 | Secondary school | Secondary school |
| Grade 3 | 16–17 | Secondary school | Secondary school |
| Grade 4 | 17–18 | Secondary school | Secondary school |
| Grade 5 (only in vocational schools) | 18–19 | Secondary school | Secondary school |

=== Russia ===
In Russia, compulsory education lasts eight or nine years and begins the year the child turns seven (8 years) or, sometimes, six (9 years). The first stage of elementary school can last either 3 years (so called 1–3 programme for children starting at the age of 7) or 4 years (so called 1–4 programme for children starting at the age of 6). After of the first stage all pupils enter 5th grade, thus pupils that started at the age of 7 do not attend the 4th grade.

Educational stages in Russia
| Year | Ages | School |
|---|---|---|
| Yasli | 1–2 | Early |
| Kindergarten | 3–7 | Early |
| First grade | 6–8 | Elementary |
| Second grade | 7–9 | Elementary |
| Third grade | 8–10 | Elementary |
| Fourth grade | 9–10 (students in the 1–4 programme) | |
| Fifth grade | 10–11 | Middle |
| Sixth grade | 11–12 | Middle |
| Seventh grade | 12–13 | Middle |
| Eighth grade | 13–14 | Middle |
| Ninth grade | 14–15 | Middle |
| Tenth grade | 15–16 | High |
| Eleventh grade | 16–17 | High |

While it is not compulsory to remain in school after graduating from middle school, a student cannot progress to tertiary school without graduating from high school or vocational school.

=== Serbia ===
In Serbia, children undergo thirteen years of formal education, usually starting at age 4, 5 or 6, and finishing at age 18 or 19. By the law children need to enter Primary school at the year they will turn 7 years of age, with some wiggle room if the child is born too close to a new year. The first four years of primary school, children have their own classroom and one teacher that teaches them all the subjects, from grade 5 of primary school to the end of high school lessons are held by number of teachers specialised for specific subjects and children change their classrooms every class. Children start their school year on September 1, and end the year at the end of June/beginning of July. The exception is the grade 8 of primary school and the grade 4 of high school when the classes end a couple of months earlier so the children can study for their entry exams for high school/college. Depending on which high school a child chooses, they can get more focused education and a professional degree. High school is not compulsory education but is needed to get some professional degrees in order to be able to find a job (for example: Nurse, Locksmith, Computer network administrator, Textile design technician, etc.)

| Year | Ages | School |
|---|---|---|
| Nursery | 1–3 | Preschool |
| Kindergarten | 3–5 | Preschool |
| Prep/Kindergarten/Pre-primary | 5–6 | Preschool |
| Grade or Year 1 | 6–7 | Primary school |
| Grade or Year 2 | 7–8 | Primary school |
| Grade or Year 3 | 8–9 | Primary school |
| Grade or Year 4 | 9–10 | Primary school |
| Grade or Year 5 | 10–11 | Primary school |
| Grade or Year 6 | 11–12 | Primary school |
| Grade or Year 7 | 12–13 | Primary school |
| Grade or Year 8 | 13–14 | Primary school |
| Grade or Year 1 | 14–15 | Secondary – High school |
| Grade or Year 2 | 15–16 | |
| Grade or Year 3 | 16–17 | |
| Grade or Year 4 | 17–18 | |

=== Singapore ===
In Singapore, compulsory education lasts ten years and begins the year the child turns seven. However, most children receive a preschool education spanning two to three years before entering primary school after which they will move on to a secondary school, where Sec 5 is only made compulsory for students who have achieved a determined score for their PSLE. For Secondary School, there are three streamings: Express (Exp), Normal Academic (NA), and Normal Technical (NT), among which Exp and NT students study for four years while NA students need to study for five years. The Exp stream leads to a Singapore-Cambridge GCE Ordinary Level while the NA and NT stream leads to a Singapore-Cambridge GCE Normal Level. Some schools also offer the Integrated Programme which combines secondary school and junior college to directly offer the Singapore-Cambridge GCE Advanced Level. Depending on which stream one is in, and whether the school's scoring requirement is met, a student may be retained/transferred to NA/NT.

Educational stages in Singapore
| Year | Ages | School |
|---|---|---|
| Nursery (N1/2) | 3–4 | Nursery Kindergarten |
| Kindergarten (K1/2) | 5–6 | |
| Primary One | 6–7 | Primary |
| Primary Two | 7–8 | |
| Primary Three | 8–9 | |
| Primary Four | 9–10 | |
| Primary Five | 10–11 | |
| Primary Six | 11–12 | |
| Secondary One [Express/Normal Academic (NA)/Normal Technical(NT)] | 12–13 | Secondary |
| Secondary Two [Express/Normal Academic (NA)/Normal Technical(NT)] | 13–14 | |
| Secondary Three [Express/Normal Academic (NA)/Normal Technical(NT)] | 14–15 | |
| Secondary Four [Express/Normal Academic (NA)/Normal Technical(NT)] | 15–16 | |
| Secondary Five [Normal Academic (NA)/Normal Technical(NT)] | 16–17 | |
| Junior College One or Pre-University One | 16-17 | Junior College (JC) or Centralised Institute (CI) |
| Junior College Two or Pre-University Two | 17–18 | |
| Pre-University Three [CI only] | 18–19 | |

While it is not compulsory to remain in school after graduating from secondary school, most go on to receive their tertiary education at a Junior College, a polytechnic, or an institute of technical education (ITE) before moving on to university. Most junior colleges offer the Singapore-Cambridge GCE Advanced Level while some offer the International Baccalaureate after 2 years of study.

=== Spain ===
In Spain, education is divided into several stages: Kindergarten, primary education and secondary education. Kindergartens are schools for children 0–3 years old, and are normally private institutions, although some of them receive public funding as well ("Concertados"). Primary education is delivered almost exclusively through primary schools which offer education for pupils aged between 3 and 12. Children are entitled to preschool education from their third birthday, although it is not compulsory (but it is recommended) and must enter compulsory education from the September after their 5th birthday. There is some leeway in the starting date for pupils.

Education lasts six years in the compulsory section of primary school, before pupils move to a secondary school for between four and six years, the last two being optional. There is some variation in the phasing of education because private institutions may provide education from kindergarten or primary school until the end of secondary school, and private institutions with public funding normally teach from kindergarten until the 4th year in the secondary school level.

Numbering of years in Spanish state schools
| Year | Optionality | Ages | School |
|---|---|---|---|
| Nursery/Kindergarten | Optional | 0–3 | |
| Primero de infantil (Preschool 1) | Optional | 2–4 | Primary |
| Segundo de infantil (Preschool 2) | Optional | 3–5 | Primary |
| Tercero de infantil (Preschool 3) | Optional | 4–6 | Primary |
| Primary One | Compulsory | 5–7 | Primary |
| Primary Two | Compulsory | 6–8 | Primary |
| Primary Three | Compulsory | 7–9 | Primary |
| Primary Four | Compulsory | 8–10 | Primary |
| Primary Five | Compulsory | 9–11 | Primary |
| Primary Six | Compulsory | 10–12 | Primary |
| First year (or 1 ESO) | Compulsory | 11–13 | Secondary |
| Second Year (or 2 ESO) | Compulsory | 12–14 | Secondary |
| Third Year (or 3 ESO) | Compulsory | 13–15 | Secondary |
| Fourth Year (or 4 ESO) | Compulsory | 14–16 | Secondary |
| 1 Bachillerato | Optional | 15–17 | Secondary |
| 2 Bachillerato | Optional | 16–18 | Secondary |

=== Sri Lanka ===
Sri Lanka enforces compulsory education and it is mandatory for a child to at least complete one year of pre-school by the time the child reaches the completion of age 4. By the time they have reached the age of 5 years, enrollment to Grade 1 is made a legal obligation with continuation through at least age 14.

Primary school to higher education are primarily funded and overseen by two governmental ministries and the main Department.

- Ministry of Education
  - Department of Examinations
- Ministry of Higher Education

Educational stages in Sri Lanka
| Year | Ages | School |
|---|---|---|
| Kindergarten | 3–5 | Pre-School |
| Grade One | 5–6 | Primary |
| Grade Two | 6–7 | Primary |
| Grade Three | 7–8 | Primary |
| Grade Four | 8–9 | Primary |
| Grade Five – Optional Scholarship Examination | 9–10 | Primary |
| Grade Six | 10–11 | Secondary |
| Grade Seven | 11–12 | Secondary |
| Grade Eight | 12–13 | Secondary |
| Grade Nine | 13–14 | Secondary |
| Grade Ten | 14–15 | Secondary |
| Grade Eleven – G.C.E Ordinary Level Examination | 15–16 | Secondary |
| Grade Twelve | 16–17 | Collegiate |
| Grade Thirteen – G.C.E Advanced Level Examination | 17–18 | |

==== Tertiary education ====
Undergraduate education in state universities is free but extremely competitive, limited, and standardized. Selection of students is done on the basis of rank order on average Z Scores obtained by candidates at the Advanced Level under a transparent national policy to replicate a district basis representation. Only the top students from each district receive admission.

=== Sweden ===
In Sweden children start school at the age of six with preschool class; before that preschool is voluntary.

- 6–7: Preschool class (Förskoleklass)

First set of grades are called "lågstadiet" (low grades).

- 7–8: "ettan" (First Grade)
- 8–9: "tvåan" (Second Grade)
- 9–10: "trean" (Third grade)

Second set of grades are called "mellanstadiet" (middle grades).

- 10–11: "fyran" (Fourth grade)
- 11–12: "femman" (Fifth grade)
- 12–13: "sexan" (Sixth grade)

Third set of grades are called "högstadiet" (high grades).

- 13–14: "sjuan" (Seventh grade)
- 14–15: "åttan" (Eighth grade)
- 15–16: "nian" (Ninth grade)

The last school before higher education is called "gymnasiet" (ongoing school) and is voluntary, though most choose to attend. At this level students decide among separate career-related programmes.

- 16–17: "första ring" (First Level)
- 17–18: "andra ring" (Second Level)
- 18–19: "tredje ring" (Third Level)

=== Taiwan ===
| Level | Grade | Age | Notes |
|---|---|---|---|
| Kindergarten | none | 3–6 | Preschool education Regulated by the Early Childhood Education and Care Act |
| Elementary school | 1st | 6–7 | National education, compulsory education Regulated by the Primary and Junior High School Act |
| Elementary school | 2nd | 7–8 | National education, compulsory education Regulated by the Primary and Junior High School Act |
| Elementary school | 3rd | 8–9 | National education, compulsory education Regulated by the Primary and Junior High School Act |
| Elementary school | 4th | 9–10 | National education, compulsory education Regulated by the Primary and Junior High School Act |
| Elementary school | 5th | 10–11 | National education, compulsory education Regulated by the Primary and Junior High School Act |
| Elementary school | 6th | 11–12 | National education, compulsory education Regulated by the Primary and Junior High School Act |
| Junior high school | 7th | 12–13 | National education, compulsory education Regulated by the Primary and Junior High School Act |
| Junior high school | 8th | 13–14 | National education, compulsory education Regulated by the Primary and Junior High School Act |
| Junior high school | 9th | 14–15 | National education, compulsory education Regulated by the Primary and Junior High School Act |
| Senior high school | Senior High 1st (10th) | 15–16 | National education since 2019; Regulated by the Senior High School Education Act |
| Senior high school | Senior High 2nd (11th) | 16–17 | National education since 2019; Regulated by the Senior High School Education Act |
| Senior high school | Senior High 3rd (12th) | 17–18 | National education since 2019; Regulated by the Senior High School Education Act |

=== Turkey ===
| Year | Ages | Stage |
|---|---|---|
| Kindergarten | 5–6 | Before School / Kindergarten |
| Year 1 | 6–7 | Elementary |
| Year 2 | 7–8 | Elementary |
| Year 3 | 8–9 | Elementary |
| Year 4 | 9–10 | Elementary |
| Year 5 | 10–11 | Secondary |
| Year 6 | 11–12 | Secondary |
| Year 7 | 12–13 | Secondary |
| Year 8 | 13–14 | Secondary |
| Year 9 | 14–15 | High school |
| Year 10 | 15–16 | High school |
| Year 11 | 16–17 | High school |
| Year 12 | 17–18 | High school |

=== United Kingdom ===
==== England, Wales and Northern Ireland ====
In England, Wales and Northern Ireland education is divided into two stages: primary education and secondary education. Required assessment within the National Curriculum takes place in years 2 and 6 (National Curriculum assessments) and Year 11 (GCSEs). School education is generally followed by two years of further education – often in a 6th form or 6th form college and then three or four years at university by those who decide to stay in education.

In England, children begin school either in the school year or school term in which they reach their fifth birthday. In Wales, children begin school on a part-time basis the September after they reach their third birthday. Primary schools educate children from Reception through to Year 6, and may be subdivided into infant and junior schools. Alternatively, children may attend private prep schools.

Secondary education is compulsory up to the age of 16, at which point students graduate high-school (also known as secondary school). Post-16 education is optional and takes the form of college, sixth form or university, each of which is not compulsory. However, in England there is a requirement that upon graduation, those leaving school either be in work or enrolled in further or higher education (such as, college, sixth form, or university) until 18. Schools have various possible names, such as grammar, comprehensive and secondary schools, which may or may not indicate selective admission or tuition fees (see main article). Sixth form education is not compulsory, and not all secondary schools have a sixth form. There are also 6th form colleges just for Year 12 and 13 students.

Some secondary schools still use the 'form' system, with Year 7 being 1st Form (or '1st year'), Year 8 being Second Form, et cetera, up until Year 12 and Year 13, which together make up the 6th Form (namely lower and upper sixth form). Some independent schools use other naming systems.

In some areas in England, a three-tier system of education is used, in which students pass through three stages: First school/Lower school (Reception to Year 3/4), Middle school (Year 4/5 to Year 7/8) and finally High or Upper School (Year 8/9–Year 13)

| Key stage | Year | Final exam | Age | State funded schools | | | | Selective schools | Fee-paying independent schools |
|---|---|---|---|---|---|---|---|---|---|
| Early years | Nursery (or pre-school) | None, though individual schools may set end of year tests. | 3 to 4 | Primary | | Lower | Infant | Various 'gifted and talented' programmes within state and independent schools. | Pre-preparatory |
| Early years | Reception (or Foundation) | None, though individual schools may set end of year tests. | 4 to 5 | Primary | | Lower | Infant | Various 'gifted and talented' programmes within state and independent schools. | Pre-preparatory |
| KS1 | Year 1 | None, though individual schools may set end of year tests. | 5 to 6 | Primary | | Lower | Infant | Various 'gifted and talented' programmes within state and independent schools. | Pre-preparatory |
| KS1 | Year 2 | None, though individual schools may set end of year tests. | 6 to 7 | Primary | | Lower | Infant | Various 'gifted and talented' programmes within state and independent schools. | Pre-preparatory |
| KS2 | Year 3 | None, though individual schools may set end of year tests. | 7 to 8 | Primary | | Lower | Junior | Various 'gifted and talented' programmes within state and independent schools. | Pre-preparatory |
| KS2 | Year 4 | None, though individual schools may set end of year tests. | 8 to 9 | Primary | | Lower | Junior | Various 'gifted and talented' programmes within state and independent schools. | Preparatory or Junior |
| KS2 | Year 5 | None, though individual schools may set end of year tests. | 9 to 10 | Primary | | Middle | Junior | Various 'gifted and talented' programmes within state and independent schools. | Preparatory or Junior |
| KS2 | Year 6 | SATs; A grammar school entrance exam, often the 11-plus | 10 to 11 | Primary | | Middle | Junior | Various 'gifted and talented' programmes within state and independent schools. | Preparatory or Junior |
| KS3 | Year 7 | None, though individual schools may set end of year tests, or mock GCSE exams. | 11 to 12 | Secondary | Lower school | Middle | Senior | Grammar school | Preparatory or Junior |
| KS3 | Year 8 | None, though individual schools may set end of year tests, or mock GCSE exams. | 12 to 13 | Secondary | Lower school | Middle | Senior | Grammar school | Preparatory or Junior |
| KS3 | Year 9 | None, though individual schools may set end of year tests, or mock GCSE exams. | 13 to 14 | Secondary | Lower school | Upper | Senior | Grammar school | Senior (public/private school) |
| KS4 | Year 10 | None, though individual schools may set end of year tests, or mock GCSE exams. | 14 to 15 | Secondary | Upper school | Upper | Senior | Grammar school | Senior (public/private school) |
| KS4 | Year 11 | GCSE | 15 to 16 | Secondary | Upper school | Upper | Senior | Grammar school | Senior (public/private school) |
| KS5 | Year 12 | Advanced subsidiary level or school-set end of year tests. | 16 to 17 | College | Sixth form | | Senior | Grammar school | Senior (public/private school) |
| KS5 | Year 13 | A-Levels | 17 to 18 | College | Sixth form | | Senior | Grammar school | Senior (public/private school) |

==== Scotland ====
In Scotland, education is divided into two stages: primary education and secondary education. Primary education is delivered almost exclusively through primary schools which offer education for pupils aged between 4 and 12. Children are entitled to pre-school education from their third birthday, and must enter compulsory education from the August after their 5th birthday. There is some leeway in the starting date for pupils.

Education lasts seven years in the primary school, before pupils move to a secondary school for between 4 and 6 years, the last two being optional. There is some variation in the phasing of education in more remote areas of Scotland, where provision may be made in a through school, or in other combinations of institutes.

Numbering of years in Scottish state schools
| Year | Ages | School |
|---|---|---|
| Nursery | 3–5 | |
| Primary One | 4–6 | Primary |
| Primary Two | 5–7 | Primary |
| Primary Three | 6–8 | Primary |
| Primary Four | 7–9 | Primary |
| Primary Five | 8–10 | Primary |
| Primary Six | 9–11 | Primary |
| Primary Seven | 10–12 | Primary |
| First year (or S1) | 11–13 | Secondary |
| Second Year (or S2) | 12–14 | Secondary |
| Third Year (or S3) | 13–15 | Secondary |
| Fourth Year (or S4) | 14–16 | Secondary |
| Fifth Year (or S5) | 15–17 | Secondary |
| Sixth Year (or S6) | 16–18 | Secondary |

=== United States ===
Table US: Ages in grades
| Ages | Year |
|---|---|
| 1–3 | Daycare |
| 3–5 | Preschool |
Elementary School
| 5–6 | Kindergarten |
| 6–7 | First grade |
| 7–8 | Second grade |
| 8–9 | Third grade |
| 9–10 | Fourth grade |
| 10–11 | Fifth grade |
Middle school
| 11–12 | Sixth grade |
| 12–13 | Seventh grade |
| 13–14 | Eighth grade |
High school
| 14–15 | Ninth grade (freshman) |
| 15–16 | Tenth grade (sophomore) |
| 16–17 | Eleventh grade (junior) |
| 17–18 | Twelfth grade (senior) |

In the United States (U.S.), grades traditionally begin at 1 and run to 12; they are referred to by ordinal number (e.g., first grade or 1st grade). An additional preceding level called kindergarten ("K") is now standard in most areas, and a further preceding level called preschool education or nursery school is not uncommon. In some parts of the state of Wisconsin, kindergarten is split further into junior and senior kindergarten.

Before the term "middle school" became much more common, 7th and 8th grades were placed in "junior high school". In certain junior high schools, either 6th grade or 9th grade was also included (but not both in the same school).

At the secondary school level ("high school"), the 9th through 12th grades are also known respectively as freshman (or "first-year"), sophomore, junior, and senior. At the postsecondary or "undergraduate" level (college or university), the same four terms are reused to describe a student's college years, but numbered grades are not used at the college level. American graduate and postgraduate education does not use grades.

The adjacent Table US outlines the ages, in years, of each grade level in the US. However, students are sometimes older because of grade retention or younger because of grade skipping.

Elementary school students at a specific grade level are traditionally assigned to a single class that usually stays together in the same classroom with the same teacher throughout each school day for the entire school year (although the teacher may temporarily hand off the class to specialists for certain subject matter units). Students in middle school and high school are allowed to build schedules from a mix of required and elective courses taught by different teachers in different classrooms, going from one to the next during each school day, and are more likely to encounter students from different grades in their courses (especially electives).

==== Comparison of American and British English ====
The naming of school years in British (except Scotland) and American English
| Age range | British English | | | American English | |
| Age range | Name | Alternative/old name | Syllabus | Name | Alternative name |
|---|---|---|---|---|---|
| | Preschool (optional) | | | | |
| 3–4 | Nursery | Playgroup | Foundation Stage 1 | Daycare | |
| | Primary school | | | Daycare | |
| 4–5 | Reception | Infants reception | Foundation Stage 2 | Preschool | Pre-K |
| | | | | Elementary school | |
| 5–6 | Year 1 | Infants year 1 | Key Stage 1 | Kindergarten | |
| 6–7 | Year 2 | Infants year 2 | Key Stage 1 | 1st grade | |
| 7–8 | Year 3 | First year Junior | Key Stage 2 | 2nd grade | |
| 8–9 | Year 4 | Second year Junior | Key Stage 2 | 3rd grade | |
| 9–10 | Year 5 | Third year Junior | Key Stage 2 | 4th grade | |
| 10–11 | Year 6 | Fourth year Junior | Key Stage 2 | 5th grade | |
| | Secondary school / High school | | | Middle school | |
| 11–12 | Year 7 | First form | Key Stage 3 | 6th grade | |
| 11–12 | Year 7 | First form | Key Stage 3 | 6th grade | Junior high school |
| 12–13 | Year 8 | Second form | Key Stage 3 | 7th grade | |
| 13–14 | Year 9 | Third form | Key Stage 3 | 8th grade | |
| 13–14 | Year 9 | Third form | Key Stage 3 | High school | |
| 14–15 | Year 10 | Fourth form | Key Stage 4, GCSE | 9th grade | Freshman year |
| 14–15 | Year 10 | Fourth form | Key Stage 4, GCSE | 9th grade | Senior high school |
| 15–16 | Year 11 | Fifth form | Key Stage 4, GCSE | 10th grade | Sophomore year |
| 15–16 | Sixth form / FE College | | | 10th grade | Sophomore year |
| 16–17 | Year 12 | Lower sixth (AS) | Key Stage 5, A level | 11th grade | Junior year |
| 17–18 | Year 13 | Upper sixth (A2) | Key Stage 5, A level | 12th grade | Senior year |

== See also ==
- Multi-age classroom
- Education by country
- United Nations Human Development Index
