= Education in Sri Lanka =

Ministry of Education Ministry of Higher Education

National education budget (2023)
- Budget: 1.6% of GDP

General details
- Primary languages: Sinhala, Tamil and English
- System type: Provincial

Literacy (2024)
- Total: 93.3%
- Male: 94%
- Female: 92.6%

Enrollment (2025)
- Total: 3,747,544
- Primary: 1,427,829
- Secondary: 2,312,282

Education in Sri Lanka has a long history that dates back two millennia. While the Constitution of Sri Lanka does not provide free education as a fundamental right, the constitution mentions that 'the complete eradication of illiteracy and the assurance to all persons of the right to universal and equal access to education at all levels" in its section on directive principles of state policy at (27(2)(H). Sri Lanka's population had an adult literacy rate of 96.3% in 2015, which is above average by world and regional standards. (Note: In 2013, South Asia's literacy rate was 67.55%, Asia 84.32% and the world 85.20%.)

Education plays a major part in the life and culture of the country, which dates back to 543 BC. Sri Lanka's modern educational system, which is modeled after the Christian missionary system, was brought about by its integration into the British Empire in the 19th century. Education currently falls under the control of both the Central Government and the Provincial Councils, with some responsibilities lying with the Central Government and the Provincial Council having autonomy for others.

The Human Rights Measurement Initiative (HRMI) finds that Sri Lanka is fulfilling 95.5% of what it should be fulfilling for the right to education based on the country's level of income. HRMI breaks down the right to education by looking at the rights to both primary education and secondary education. While taking into consideration Sri Lanka's income level, the nation is achieving 97.7% of what should be possible based on its resources (income) for primary education and 93.3% for secondary education.

== Administration of the system ==
Primary school to higher education are primarily funded and overseen by three governmental ministries.

- Ministry of Education: for schools, pirivenas (schools for Buddhist priests), teachers training colleges and colleges of education
  - Department of Examinations: National examination service
- Ministry of Higher Education: for universities
- Ministry of Education Services: for supplying the physical facilities required for general education
- Ministry of Skills Development and Vocational Training: for vocational education and technical colleges

Exceptions to this system exist — mostly when it comes to tertiary with several public universities and institutes coming under the purview of different ministries. These divisions have led to a high degree of mismanagement and inefficiency over the years.

The National Institute of Education (NIE), Sri Lanka, based in Maharagama, was established in 1986 under the provisions of the National Institute of Education Act No. 28 of 1985. The aim of the institute is to "provide leadership for the development of general education with quality, equity and relevance in a pluralistic society".

== History ==
Education in Sri Lanka has a history of over 2300 years. It is believed that the Sanskrit language was brought to the island from North India as a result of the establishment of the Buddhism in the reign of King Devanampiya Tissa from the Buddhist monks sent by Emperor Asoka of India. Since then an education system evolved based around the Buddhist temples and pirivenas (monastic colleges), the latter primarily intended for clergy (even to this day) and higher education. Evidence of this system is found on the Mahawamsa and Dipavamsa, the Chronicle of Lanka that deals with the history of the island from the arrival of Prince Vijaya and his followers in the 6th century BC.

With the outset of the colonial expansion on the island, first in the coastal provinces and then interior, Christian missionary societies become active in education. The monopoly of Christian missionaries in education ended following the Colebrooke Commission set up by the British administration.

=== Primary and secondary schools ===
A standard system of schools were begun by the British based on the recommendations of the Colebrooke Commission in 1836. This is regarded as the beginning of the government's schooling system in the island. It started with the establishment of the Royal College in Colombo (formerly the Colombo Academy) and lead to the formation of several single sex schools constructed during the colonial period, by the British. Some of these schools were affiliated to the Anglican Church. These included S.Thomas' College Mount Lavinia, Trinity College Kandy, and Bishop's College Colombo. The education in vernacular schools was largely free due to government grants to cover the cost of teaching and local philanthropists providing the buildings, equipment and the books. Colebrooke decreed that all government schools be discontinued. The order did not apply to denominational Missionary schools and they continued to function unceasingly.

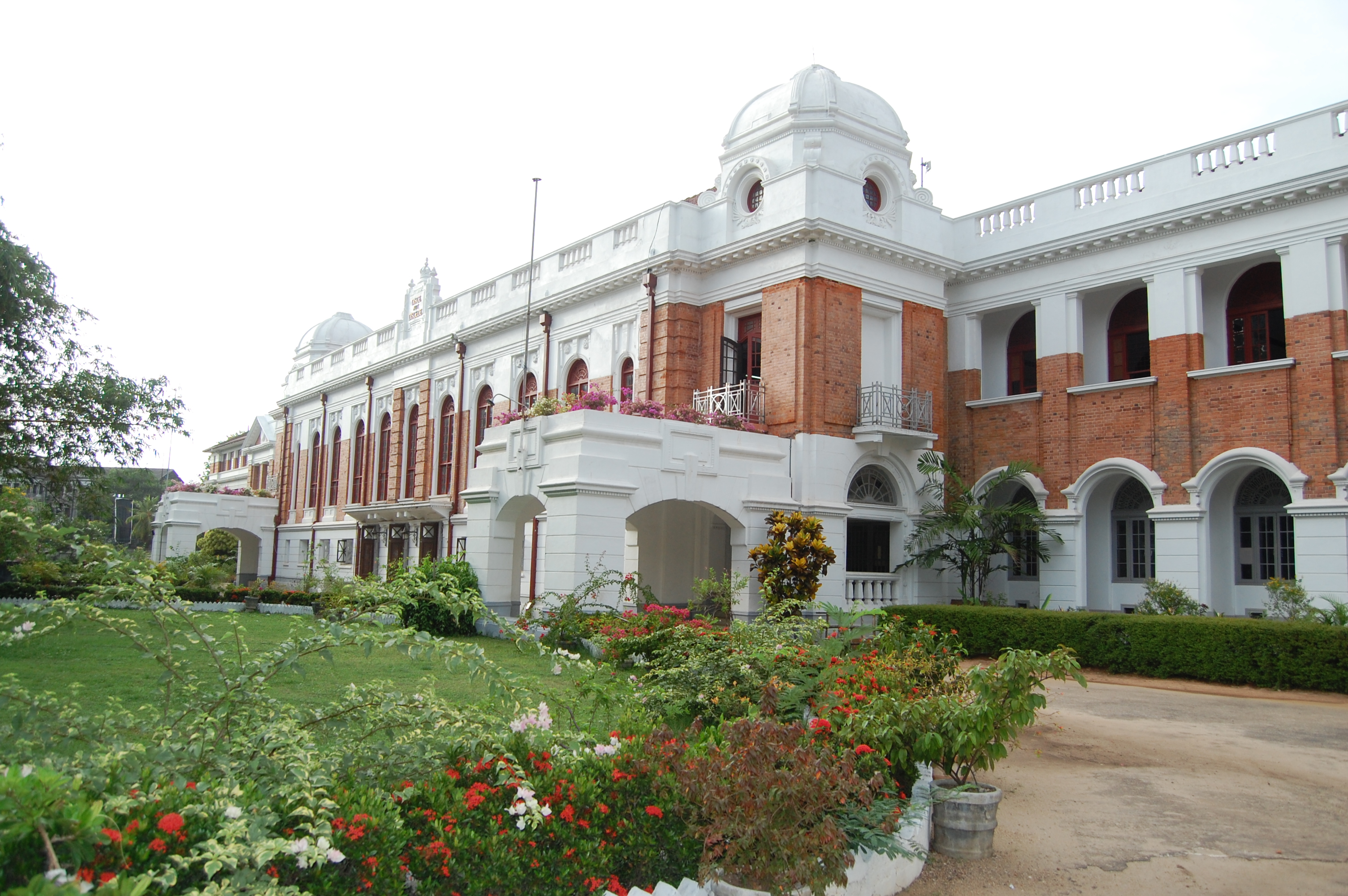
Royal College Main building

In 1938 the education system in Ceylon (now Sri Lanka) was made formally free following the granting of universal franchise in 1931. The Minister of Education, late Hon. Dr. C.W.W. Kannangara, and the Executive Committee of Education which included members such as H. W. Amarasuriya took the initiative in establishing free education. Under this initiative the government established Madhya Maha Vidyalayas (MMV, Central Colleges) that were scattered around the island to provide education to all. The medium was either Sinhala or Tamil.

In 1942 a special committee was appointed to observe the education system and, among the suggestions that followed, the following play an important role:

- i. Make available to all children a good education free of charge, so that education ceases to be a commodity purchasable only by the urban affluent.
- ii. Make national languages the media of instruction in place of English so that opportunities for higher education, lucrative employment open only to small number of the urban affluent, would become available to others as well.
- iii. Rationalize the school system so that educational provision is adequate, efficient and economical.
- iv. Ensure that every child is provided with instruction in the religion of his/her parents.
- v. Protect teachers from exploitation by managers of schools.
- vi. Make adequate provision for adult education.

After independence, the number of schools and the literacy rate substantially increased. According to the Ministry of Statistics, today there are approximately 10,047 public schools serving close to 3,747,544 students, all around the island.

== Buddhist schools ==
During the colonial period, Buddhist revival figures including Anagarika Dharmapala worked with international associates such as Colonel Henry Steel Olcott and Madame Blavatsky of the Buddhist Theosophical Society to establish Buddhist schools offering English-medium education combined with Buddhist values instruction. Most of these schools were established in the capitals of the major provinces of Sri Lanka. The first of these were Ananda College, Colombo (formerly English Buddhist School); Dharmaraja College, Kandy (formerly Kandy Buddhist High School); Maliyadeva College, Kurunegala (formerly Kurunegala Buddhist Institution); Musaeus College, Colombo and Mahinda College, Galle (formerly Galle Buddhist Theosophical Society School); which were followed decades later by Visakha Vidyalaya, Colombo (formerly Buddhist Girls College), Nalanda College, Colombo, Sri Sumangala College and Mahamaya Vidyalaya, Kandy.

== Hindu schools ==
During the late 20th century, Hindu revival leaders began establishing schools emphasizing Saiva values with English-medium instruction. Arumuka Navalar founded the Saiva Paripalana Sabai, which led to the establishment of Jaffna Hindu College in the northern regions. The organization expanded Hindu educational provision across the Tamil-majority areas of the country.

In Colombo, Tamil educational leaders including Q.C. Nagalingam established the Hindu Educational Society, which founded Hindu College, Colombo in Bambalapitiya and a branch in Ratmalana. The society remains active, continuing its mission to promote Hindu education in surrounding communities.

== Catholic and Methodist schools ==
Sri Lanka has numerous Catholic schools including St. Joseph's College, St Bridget's Convent, Good Shepherd Convent, St Peter's College, St. Anthony's College, Kandy, Maris Stella College, Negombo and Joseph Vaz College, named after the Sri Lankan saint Joseph Vaz. These institutions developed strong academic reputations and educated generations of Catholic families across the island.

The earliest Methodist-affiliated schools, including Richmond College, Galle, Jaffna Central College, Wesley College, Colombo, Kingswood College, Kandy (formerly Boys' High School, Kandy), Girls' High School, Kandy and Methodist College, Colombo, were started by the Methodist Church. Many schools were built in the post-colonial era. However, the established schools with origins in the colonial era continue to dominate social institutions in Sri Lanka, largely through networks of alumni.

== Muslim schools ==
There are 749 Muslim schools in Sri Lanka and 205 madrasas providing Islamic education. An Islamic university operates in Beruwala (Jamiya Naleemiya). Zahira College, Colombo, established by M. C. Siddi Lebbe, is considered one of the oldest and most prominent Muslim schools in the country. Al Iman Schools in Colombo was the first institution to teach an integrated Islamic curriculum, beginning in 2008.

== Post-independence developments ==
Several changes to the school system took place in the post-independence era, including the shift of the primary medium of education to national languages, nationalization of private schools, and the introduction of a national/provincial school system. The post-independence era also saw the establishment of secular multi-religious schools, such as D. S. Senanayake College for boys and Sirimavo Bandaranaike Vidyalaya for girls.

=== University ===
Higher education in Sri Lanka has been based on the many prominent pirivenas during the pre colonial times. The origins of the modern colonial university system in Sri Lanka dates back to 1921 when a University College, the Ceylon University College was established at the former premises of Royal College Colombo affiliated to the University of London. However, the beginning of modern higher education in colonial government of Ceylon was in 1870 when the Ceylon Medical School was established followed by Colombo Law College (1875), School of Agriculture (1884) and the Government Technical College (1893).

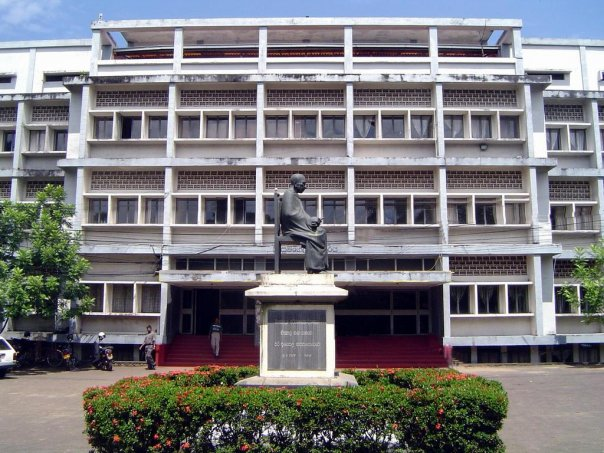
Sri Jayewardenepura University, Faculty of Humanities and Social Sciences Building

The University of Ceylon was established on 1 July 1942 by the Ceylon University Ordinance No. 20 of 1942 which was to be unitary, residential and autonomous. The university was in Colombo. Several years later a second campus was built in Peradeniya. The University of Ceylon became the University of Sri Lanka follow in the University of Ceylon Act No. 1 of 1972 resulting in a more centralized administration and more direct government control. This gave way for creation of separate universities after the Universities Act No. 16 of 1978. Even though new universities of independent identities were created, the government maintained its direct control and centralized administration though the University Grants Commission. Late Hon. Lalith Athulathmudali as Minister of Education developed an initiative to develop the higher education of the country in the 1980s, the Mahapola Fund, established by him provided scholarship and much-needed founding to higher education institution to this day. Until amendments to the University Act were made in 1999 only state universities were allowed to grant undergraduate degrees; this has since changed.

== Primary and secondary education ==
=== Structure ===
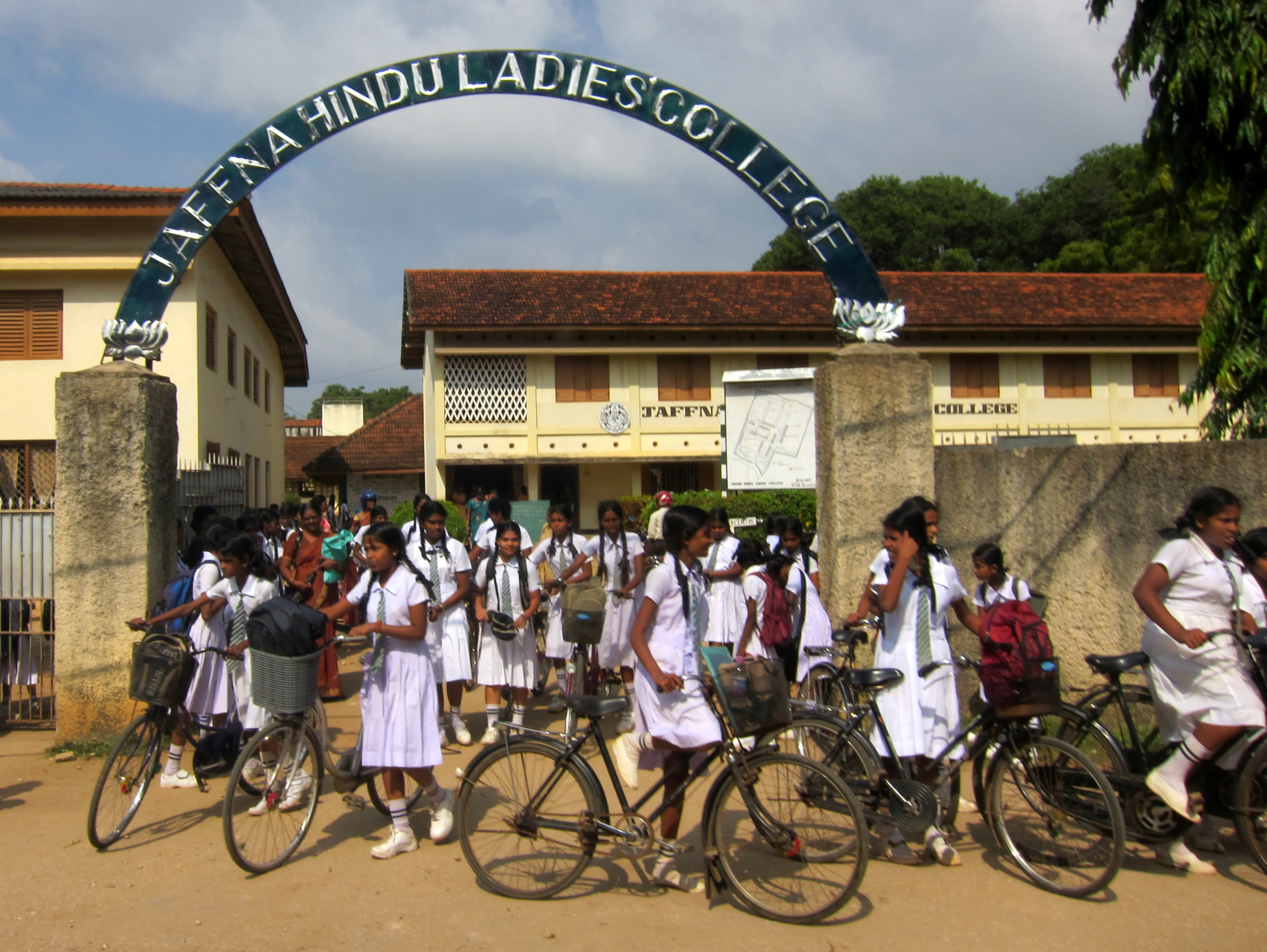
School Girls of Jaffna Hindu Ladies' College

Sri Lanka's education structure is divided into five parts: primary, junior secondary, senior secondary, collegiate, and tertiary. Primary education lasts five years (Grade 1 to Grade 5) and at the end of this period, the students may elect to write a national exam called the Scholarship exam. This exam allows students with exceptional skills to move on to better schools. After primary education, the junior secondary level (referred to as middle school in some schools) lasts for 4 years (Grades 6-9) followed by 2 years (Grades 10-11) of the senior secondary level which is the preparation for the General Certificate of Education (G.C.E) Ordinary Level (O/Ls). According to the Sri Lankan law, it is compulsory that all children go to school till grade 9 (age 14) at which point they can choose to continue their education or drop out and engage in apprenticeship for a job or farming. However, the Ministry of Education strongly advises all students to continue with their studies at least till the G.C.E Ordinary Level. Students who are pursuing tertiary education must pass the G.C.E O/Ls in order to enter the collegiate level to study for another 2 years (grades 12-13) to sit for the G.C.E Advanced Level. On successful completion of this exam, students can move on to tertiary education, therefore the GCE A/Ls is the university entrance exam in Sri Lanka.

==== Normal ages ====
===== Primary =====
- Kindergarten: 3-5 year olds
- Grade 1: 5-6 year olds
- Grade 2: 6-7 year olds
- Grade 3: 7-8 year olds
- Grade 4: 8-9 year olds
- Grade 5: 9-10 year olds - Scholarship Examination

===== Secondary =====
Junior secondary

- Grade 6: 10-11 year olds
- Grade 7: 11-12 year olds
- Grade 8: 12-13 year olds
- Grade 9: 13-14 year olds

Senior secondary

- Grade 10: 14-15 year olds
- Grade 11: 15-16 year olds - G.C.E Ordinary Level Examination

==== Collegiate ====
- Grade 12: 16-17 year olds
- Grade 13: 17-18 year olds - G.C.E Advanced Level Examination

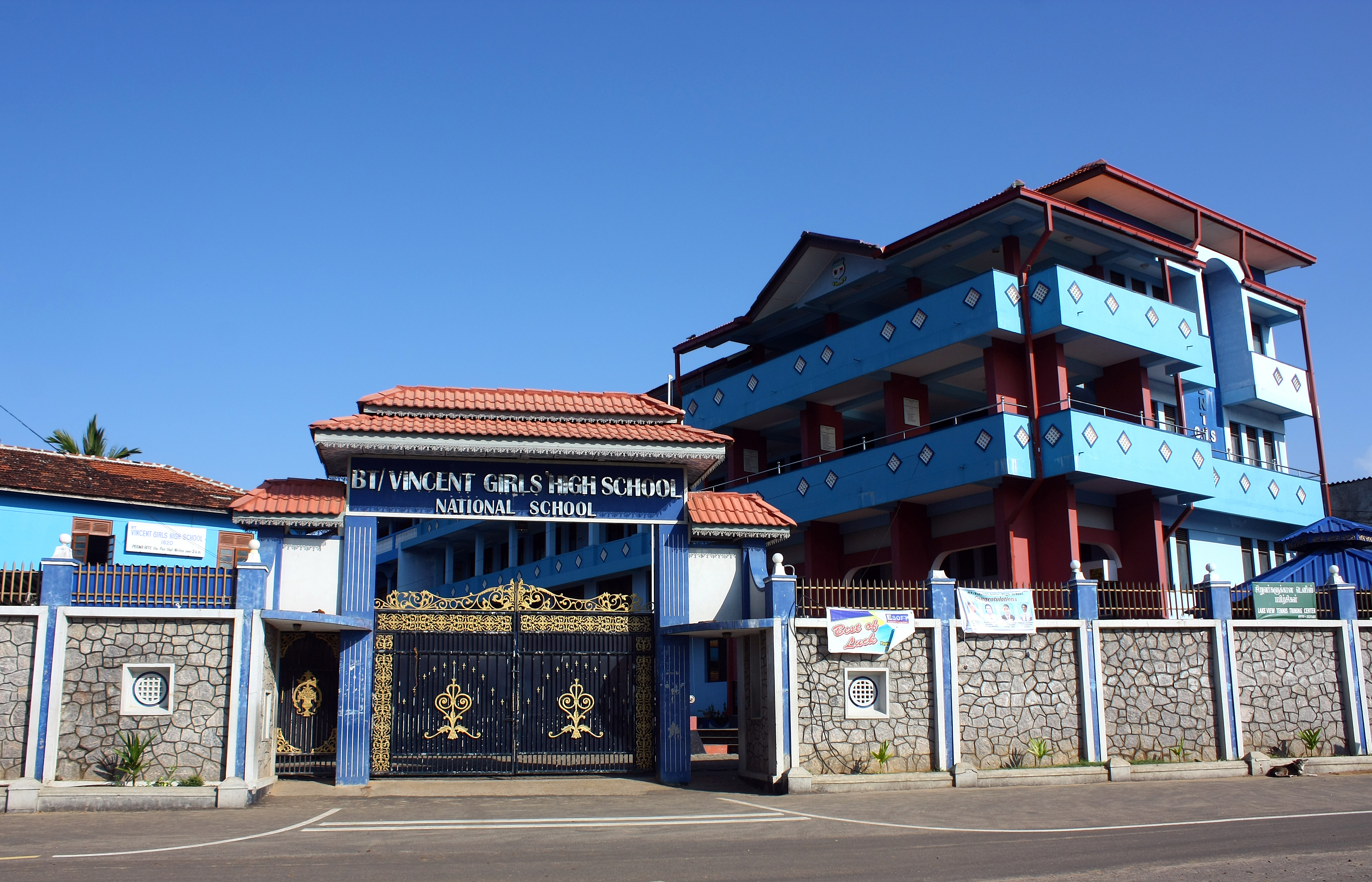
Vincent Girls' High School Batticaloa

NB: In some cases, students may be slightly younger.

=== Government schools ===
Most of the schools in Sri Lanka are maintained by the government and are free to attend. Currently (as of 2025) there are 10,047 government schools (396 national schools and 9,651 provincial schools) with a student population of 3.7 million and 242,309 teachers, 822 Pirivenas and also 95 government assisted private schools with 138,190 students. With the establishment if the provincial council system in the 1980s the central government handed control of most schools to local governments. However the old schools which had been around since the colonial times were retained by the central government, this creating three types of government schools;

- National Schools
- Provincial Schools
- Pirivenas-Schools for Buddhist priests

==== National schools ====
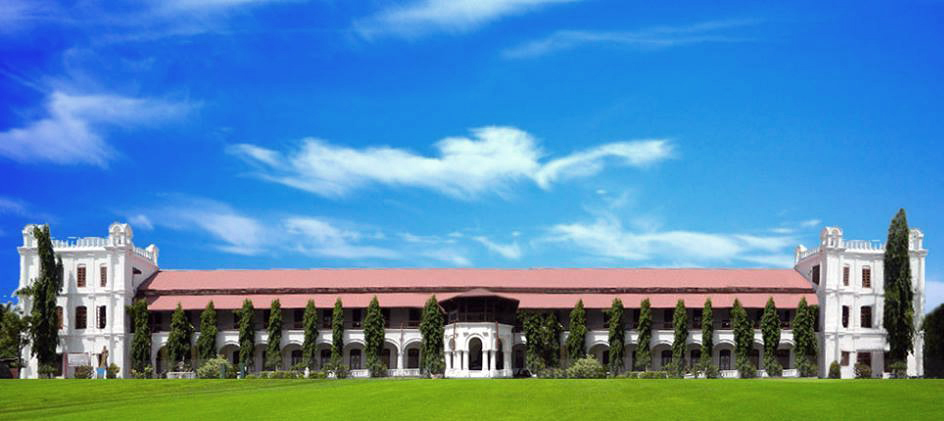
Main Building of St. Michael's College National School. It is an example for national schools in Sri Lanka.

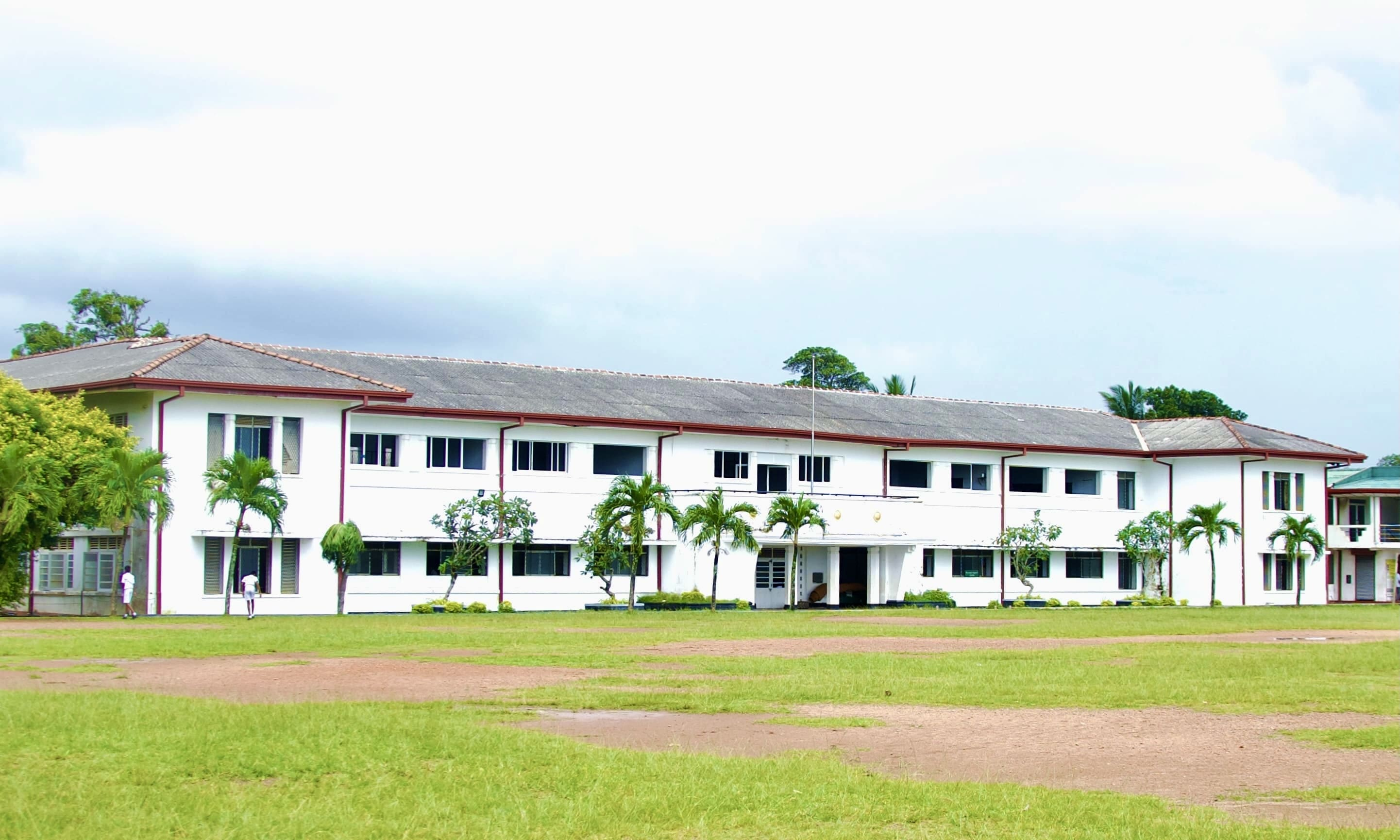
Main Building of Kalutara Vidyalaya. One of the leading national schools in Kalutara

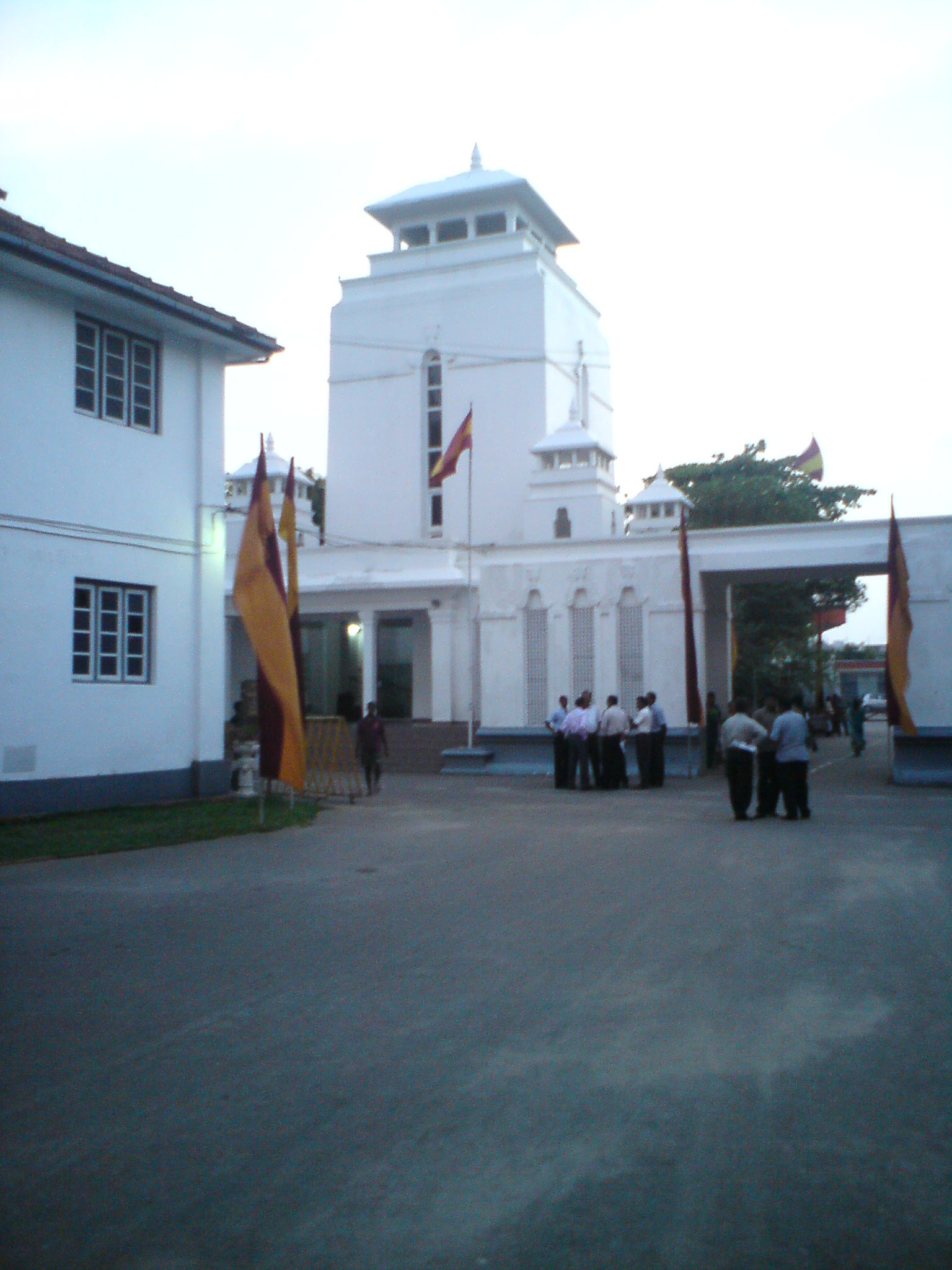
Iconic Buddhist Vihara at Ananda college. One of the leading national schools in Colombo

National schools come under the direct control of the Ministry of Education and therefore have direct funding from the ministry. Most of these schools were established during the colonial period and therefore are established institutions. These few are referred to as famous schools or elite schools since they have a rich history and better maintained facilities than the average public school. This is mainly due to the support of their alumni. In recent years newer schools and several central colleges have been upgraded to national schools from time to time, thereby making the total number of national schools 396 (as of 2025).

==== Provincial schools ====
Provincial Schools make up the vast majority of schools in Sri Lanka, numbering 9,651 (as of 2025). Funded and controlled by the local governments, many provincial schools suffer from poor facilities and a shortage of teachers.

==== Piriven ====
Piriven are monastic colleges (similar to a seminary) for the education of Buddhist priests. These have been the centers of secondary and higher education in ancient times for lay people as well. Today 822 Piriven are funded and maintained by the Ministry of Education under the Pirivena Education Act, No, 64 of 1979. Young priests undergo training at these pirivenas prior to being their Ordination and study for GCE O/L and A/L examinations. They may gain entrance to State Universities for higher religious studies.

=== Non-government schools ===
==== Private schools ====
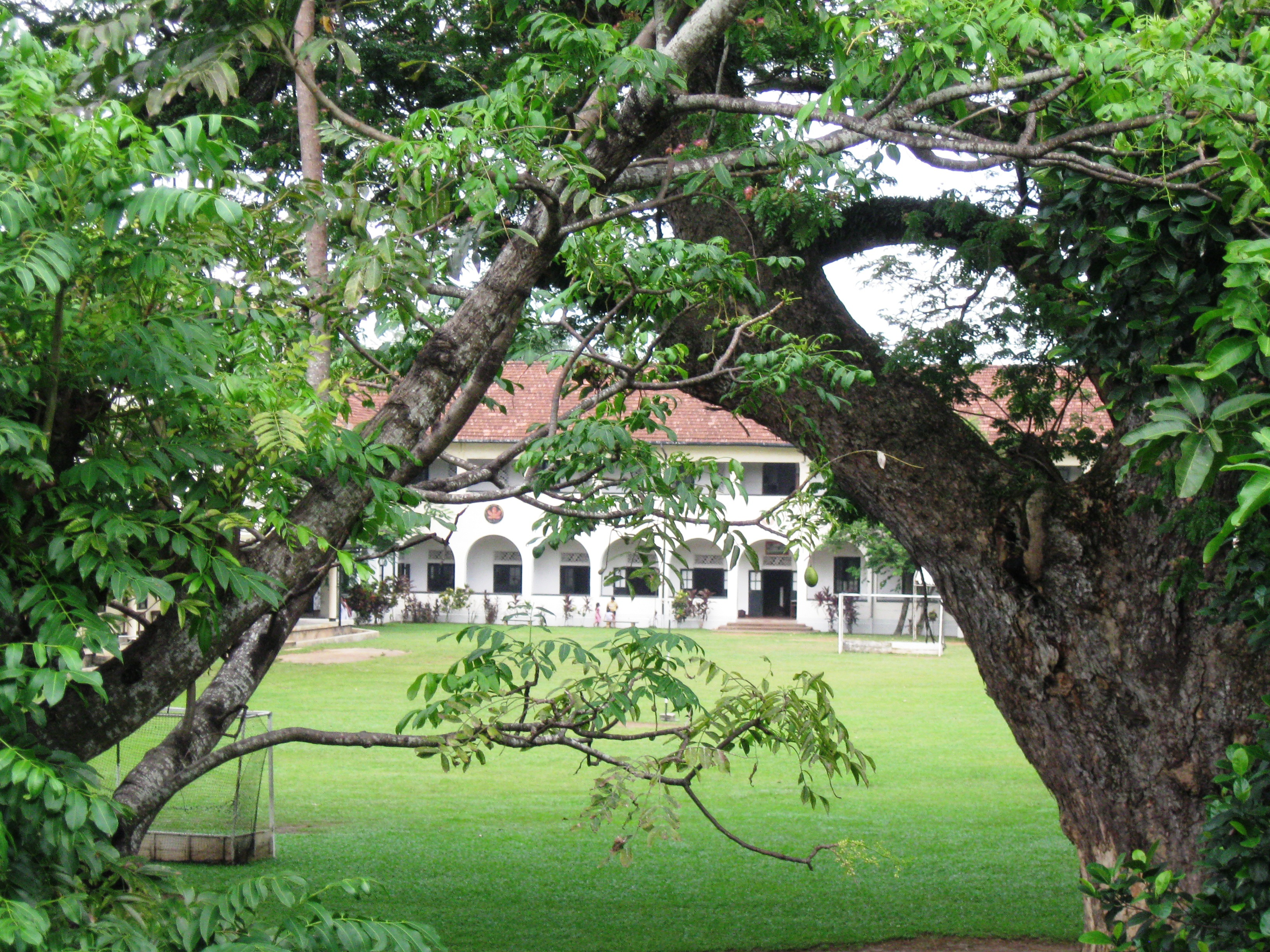
C.M.S Ladies College, one of Sri Lanka's private girls' school as seen from its grounds

There has been a considerable increase in the number of private schools in Sri Lanka, due to the emergence of the upper-middle class during the colonial era. These private schools follow the local curriculum set up by the Ministry of Education in the local language mediums of Sinhala, Tamil or English. Many of the private schools have access to newer facilities than state run schools. Currently there are 66 Private schools (registered before 1960 and not since then) of these, 33 non-fee-levying Assisted Private Schools (also known as semi-government schools) and 33 fee levying autonomous Private Schools, in addition to the Government Schools.

==== International schools ====
International schools in Sri Lanka are not restricted to the expatriate community, anyone with the ability and willingness to pay can join these schools. Starting in the late 1980s these schools have no regulation or control by the Ministry of Education as it comes under the Board of Investment (BOI), due to this the standard of education varies greatly between schools. The schools are mainly for the children of the expatriate community, charge high tuition fees and can therefore provide good facilities and high standards.

The majority of International schools prepares students for the Edexcel General Certificate of Education (IGCSE) Ordinary, Advanced Subsidiary (AS) and Advanced (A2) Level examinations, which is the most popular qualification. Preparation for Cambridge International Examinations is also offered by a few schools but it is less popular. Both exams are offered under the supervision of the British Council, whereas some schools offer a direct partnership with the examination body in order to improve standards.

==== Madrasas ====
As of 2013, there are 205 madrasas registered under the Department of Muslim Religious and Cultural Affairs providing Islamic education in Sri Lanka. These have been built and maintained by independent Islamic foundations such as All Ceylon Jamiyyathul Ulama and the Thareeqathul Aroosiyyathil Qaadhiriyyah Association in Sri Lanka which propagate Sunnah wal Jamaah. This is in addition to the 749 Muslim Schools in Sri Lanka.

==== Semi Government Schools ====
There are quite a few semi-government schools in Sri Lanka that are run as a government-private collaboration, where the government provides the textbooks, uniforms, and other facilities such as the ability to sit for national exams and the government-paid teachers.

The prominent semi-government schools are Zahira College, Colombo, Wesley College, Colombo, St. Joseph's College, Colombo, St. Peter's College, Colombo, St. Benedict's College, Colombo, Holy Family Convent, Bambalapitiya

== Tuition ==
Due to the high competitive nature of exams such as year 5, GCE O/L and GCE A/L as well as London O/Ls and A/Ls; parents seek additional help at home and at group/mass classes to improve their children's grades and performance. In recent years this has become a lucrative enterprise, which has resulted in successive governments attempting to regulate it. Many scholars have also accused tuition classes of robbing the childhood and having a negative impact on the child's health.

These Private Educational Institutes or Tuition Centers are concentrated in Major cities of Sri Lanka: Colombo, Gampaha, Kalutara, Panadura, Negombo, Horana, Kurunegala, Kandy, Galle, Matara, Tangalle, Kegalle, Badulla and Ratnapura.

With the rise of digital learning, several online platforms have emerged to help students find tutors more efficiently. Websites like tuteclass.com provide a directory of tuition teachers, allowing students to filter by grade, subject, medium, class type, and location. These platforms aim to improve accessibility to private tutoring, especially in urban areas.

Online tutor directories have gained popularity due to their convenience, wide selection of tutors, and detailed information on tuition classes. Some platforms also integrate virtual learning tools to support remote education.

== Tertiary education ==
Undergraduate education in state universities is free but extremely competitive. Fewer than 16% of those who qualify get admission to state universities and of that only half graduate. Admission to the university system is based on the highly competitive GCE Advanced Level examination. Selection of students is done on the basis of rank order on average Z Scores obtained by candidates at the GCE Advanced Level. This is done under a transparent national policy to replicate a district basis representation.

The top students from urban and rural districts get the chances of having tertiary education. However, top students who got qualified under the minimum Z Scores requirements for admissions from remote districts may get in with relatively lower marks than those from urban districts. As a result, many students who are not granted admission find other means of higher education. Around 8% those qualified but could not get admission for higher education go abroad to pursue their studies, others enroll themselves at the Open University of Sri Lanka

Some study for entrance/membership for professional bodies both foreign (such as CIMA, BCS, ACCA, etc.) and local (such as ICASL, SLIM) or do studies at vocational technical colleges that specialize in mechanical and electronic subjects. Government has schemes to provides financial aid in addition to free education to financially support to those qualified to get admission to state universities.

There are 17 state universities in Sri Lanka. The prominent ones are University of Colombo, University of Peradeniya, University of Kelaniya, University of Sri Jayawardhenapura, University of Moratuwa and University of Ruhuna. In recent years, with changes to the University Act, a few institutes have been given permission to grant their own degrees: The most prominent is the government-owned Sri Lanka Institute of Information Technology.

Still, there are unemployed graduates in Sri Lanka, except in the fields of medicine, information technology, commerce, law and engineering disciplines. Many claim that if state university graduates are unemployed or causes brain drain that is because of limited exposure in the country for the degrees they have.

Many intellectuals express the need for private universities in the country, where students who chose not to attend or do not gain admission to state universities could study in their home country at a lower cost. The North Colombo Medical College (NCMC) was one such institute. But efforts to establish private universities have been blocked due to protests conducted by many parties claiming that it would create more competition for state university students. In recent years this has become a reason for students who do not attend state universities to prefer going abroad or study at other institutes and professional bodies.

There are three types of Degree Awarding Private Higher Education Institutes in Sri Lanka

1. Private Institutes which offer Sri Lankan degrees recognized by University Grants Commission
2. Private Institutes which offer Foreign Degrees in affiliation with Foreign Universities
3. Professional Institutes which offer Degree Equivalent Professional Qualifications

For a complete list, see Sri Lankan universities

Classification of tertiary qualifications

- Certificate: 1 year or less than 1 year of study.
- Diploma: 1–2 years of study.
- Bachelor's degree:
  - General degree: 3 years of coursework without a major.
  - Honours/Special degree: 4 years of coursework and research with a major/specialization in a field.
- Master's degree: undertaken after the completion of one or more bachelor's degrees. Master's degrees deal with a subject at a more advanced level than bachelor's degrees and can consist either of research, coursework, or a mixture of the two.
- Doctorate: most famously Doctor of Philosophy (PhD), which are undertaken after an honours bachelor's or master's degree, by an original research project resulting in a thesis or dissertation.

== Vocational education and training ==
Vocational education and training in Sri Lanka is managed by the Tertiary and Vocational Education Commission of the Ministry of Vocational & Technical Training. Training includes course based curriculum at vocational technical training centres and apprenticeship at private or public organisations. Higher education in vocational fields could be archived though several universities. The National Vocational Qualifications Systems in Sri Lanka (NVQSL) provides a structured seven levels of qualifications from Level 1 to Level 7. Vocational education and training is carried out for degree level at the Open University, Sri Lanka and the University of Vocational Technology, as well as at diploma level at 37 technical colleges, Sri Lanka Institute of Advanced Technological Education and the Sri Lanka School of Agriculture.

Apart from these, the Ministry of Education has launched a non-formal vocational education program which allows school drop-outs and adults who did not complete their school education, to earn a living, through self-employment. Most of these courses are held at community centres and they cover a wide range of fields such as dressmaking, beauty culture, hairdressing, stitching, carpentry, plumbing, painting and so on.

Tertiary and Vocational Education Commission monitors the registration of private course providers in the development of the sector. A number of private course providers have propped up in this qualification segment. Hospitality courses, basic accounting and management courses has been offered.

== Criticisms ==
Critics of the education system, including academics and parents, state that the education system is too competitive and rigid unlike education systems in other societies.

Efforts to establish private universities have been blocked, resulting in only state universities awarding local degrees. Opponents of private universities claim that private universities as privatization of education and damaging the standard of the education. However the demand for higher education has created several private institutions that conduct courses for degrees in foreign universities, these are not regulated or evaluated for proper standards by the government or independent organizations.

=== Compulsory leadership training for undergraduates ===
In 2011, the government made it mandatory for all students selected for undergraduate courses in state universities to undergo Compulsory leadership training for undergraduates at military and police bases. The government cited the need for residential three-week training to increase employability thus reducing the high graduate unemployment in state universities. This move has drawn criticisms from the opposition, student groups and human rights groups as the nature of compulsory military type training seen in conscription. However, shortly after the 2015 presidential election, the president at the time, Maithripala Sirisena along with the Sri Lankan Parliament put an end to this training in 2015.

== See also ==
- List of digital repositories in Sri Lanka
