= Periyakomarasankulam Maha Vidyalayam =

Public provincial school in Northern Province, Sri Lanka

Periyakomarasankulam M.V.
- பெரியகோமரசன்குளம் ம.வி.

Location
- Periyakomarasankulam, Vavuniya District, Northern Province; Sri Lanka; 8°41′21.50″N 80°31′11.90″E

Information
- School type: Public provincial 1AB
- School district: Vavuniya South Education Zone
- Authority: Northern Provincial Council
- School number: 1302007
- Principal: K. Thanabalasingam
- Teaching staff: 63
- Grades: 1-13
- Gender: Mixed
- Age range: 5-18

Periyakomarasankulam Maha Vidyalayam (Tamil: பெரியகோமரசன்குளம் மகா வித்தியாலயம் Periyakōmaracaṉkuḷam Makā Vittiyālayam) is a provincial school in Periyakomarasankulam, Sri Lanka.

== See also ==
- List of schools in Northern Province, Sri Lanka
