= Pakistan Cadet School & College Murree =

Information
- Website: pakistancadetcollege.com

Pakistan Cadet School and College is an established military preparatory school located in Murree, a hill station town in the vicinity of the north Punjab, Pakistan.

The cadet college offers its students a choice of streams, offering both Pakistani stream higher education (board examination certificates) as well as GCE O and A level qualifications.
