= Scholarship Examination =

National primary-school examination in Sri Lanka

Grade 5 Scholarship Examination
- Type: National primary-school examination
- Administrator: Department of Examinations
- Purpose: Awarding bursaries and determining eligibility for admission to certain government secondary schools
- Duration: 2 hours 15 minutes
- Score range: 0–200
- Offered: Annually, to Grade 5 pupils
- Languages: Sinhala and Tamil
- Annual number of test takers: 289,867 (2026)
- Used by: Government schools admitting pupils to Grade 6; education authorities administering bursaries
- Country: Sri Lanka

The Grade 5 Scholarship Examination (also called the Scholarship Examination or Grade Five Scholarship Examination) is a national examination in Sri Lanka administered by the Department of Examinations for pupils completing the fifth year of primary school. The examination has two principal purposes: selecting pupils for admission to certain government secondary schools and identifying eligible pupils for financial assistance in the form of bursaries.

The examination developed from scholarship schemes associated with the education reforms of C. W. W. Kannangara in the 1940s. Although intended to widen access to educational opportunities, it has also attracted debate over disparities between schools, the use of private tuition and examination-related pressure on children.

A leak of questions from the 2024 examination led to a Supreme Court ruling that the rights of candidates had been violated. The examination has also been the subject of proposals to change or discontinue it, including a government plan announced in 2025 to review its future after 2029.

== History ==
The examination's origins are connected with the expansion of free education and the development of Central Colleges under education minister C. W. W. Kannangara. The early scholarship scheme was intended to enable academically able children from families with limited financial resources to continue their education at better-equipped schools, including residential central colleges. A historical account published in Daily Mirror records that 40 pupils received scholarships to attend central colleges in 1944.

The scholarship scheme evolved during the following years. In a memorial lecture published by the National Institute of Education, former education administrator R. S. Medagama recalled sitting the Grade 5 Scholarship Examination in 1947 and entering a central college the following year.

== Purpose and administration ==
The examination is administered by the Department of Examinations under Sri Lanka's education authorities. Its two main functions are to provide a basis for awarding bursaries and to assist with admission to schools offering places to pupils entering Grade 6. The bursary scheme is directed towards eligible pupils from financially disadvantaged families, while school admission is subject to factors including examination performance, preferences and the number of places available.

Participation is voluntary. In 2019, the Ministry of Education issued a circular stating that schools were not to make participation compulsory, amid concerns about the pressure associated with preparation for the examination.

=== Examination format ===
The examination is conducted in Sinhala and Tamil. The format described by the Supreme Court in its 2024 judgment consists of two papers, each marked out of 100, giving a maximum total of 200 marks. Paper I contains 40 multiple-choice questions assessing reasoning, interpretation, problem-solving and related abilities, and lasts one hour. Paper II covers language, mathematics and environmental activities from the primary-school curriculum, and lasts one hour and 15 minutes.

=== Results and school admission ===
Results are used to determine eligibility for bursaries and applications for admission to participating schools. The Department of Examinations publishes qualifying cut-off marks, while the marks required to secure places at individual schools vary according to demand and available vacancies. Meeting the general qualifying cut-off does not, by itself, guarantee admission to a particular school.

For the 2026 examination, applications for Grade 6 school placements in 2027 were to be submitted online through school principals, according to the Ministry of Education.

== Participation and results ==
The examination is taken by hundreds of thousands of pupils annually. The Department of Examinations' statistical reports for 2024 and 2025 recorded the following numbers of candidates and pupils obtaining marks at or above the common qualifying cut-off. The figures for qualification do not represent the number ultimately awarded bursaries or school places.

Candidates and qualifying results, 2019–2025
Year	Candidates who sat	At or above qualifying cut-off	Percentage
2019	332,168	47,667	14.35%
2020	326,264	47,193	14.46%
2021	335,158	47,536	14.18%
2022	329,668	48,257	14.64%
2023	332,949	50,664	15.22%
2024	319,284	51,244	16.05%
2025	303,671	51,969	17.11%

In the 2026 examination, held on 9 August, 289,867 candidates sat the papers, according to figures released with the results in September.

== Educational and social effects ==
=== Educational access and inequality ===
The Institute of Policy Studies of Sri Lanka published an evaluation of the examination in 2019. The study found that the examination fell short of its aims of widening access to quality education, citing the limited availability of places at better-resourced secondary schools and bursaries, inequalities in primary-school quality and teacher provision, and weaknesses in using examination performance to identify pupils’ abilities. It recommended measures including greater access to good schools and changes to the examination and bursary arrangements.

Academic research has also investigated whether differences in family resources affect preparation. A 2026 qualitative study published in the Journal of Social Sciences – NISD, based on interviews with pupils, parents and teachers at a school in Moratuwa, found that access to paid tuition and organised study support varied with household circumstances. The author argued that these disparities could undermine the examination's objective of broadening educational opportunity.

=== Examination pressure ===
Criticism of the examination has focused on intensive preparation, parental expectations and the effects of competitive assessment on children of primary-school age. A 2026 study by G. D. N. D. Gunasekara and S. Senarath, involving 320 pupils and interviews with parents and teachers in the Sri Jayawardenepura Education Zone, reported an association between examination-related pressures and lower self-esteem among the children studied.

The examination has nevertheless remained important to families seeking access to schools with greater resources, a tension also recognised by the Supreme Court when considering the examination's role in educational opportunity in its 2024 judgment.

== Examination integrity ==
=== 2024 question-paper leak ===
The examination held on 15 September 2024 became the subject of investigations and litigation after questions resembling those in Paper I circulated before the test. The authorities confirmed that three questions had been compromised. Parents and pupil candidates brought fundamental-rights applications before the Supreme Court of Sri Lanka, challenging the handling of the leak and the proposed response.

In its judgment of 31 December 2024, the Supreme Court ruled that the decision-making process surrounding the proposed award of marks for the three leaked questions was unlawful because the Commissioner General of Examinations had not exercised the independent authority vested in that office. The court found that the examination's compromised integrity had infringed the fundamental rights of the affected candidates. The examination was not subsequently repeated; the department proceeded with marking and results arrangements following the judgment.

== Reform proposals ==
The examination's future has been the subject of recurring policy debate. In 2019, President Maithripala Sirisena announced an intention to abolish it, citing concerns about pressure on children, but the examination continued to be held.

In June 2025, Deputy Minister of Education Madura Seneviratne told Parliament that the government intended to continue the examination through 2029, appoint a committee in 2028 to review its future and consider ways of reducing stress associated with the test. The proposal did not amount to a decision to abolish the examination.

== See also ==
- Education in Sri Lanka
- Central College (Sri Lanka)
- Department of Examinations
