= GCE Advanced Level in Sri Lanka =

School leaving qualification in Sri Lanka

The Sri Lankan Advanced Level (A-level), formerly known as the Higher School Certificate (HSC), is a General Certificate of Education (GCE) qualification exam in Sri Lanka, similar to the British Advanced Level. It is conducted annually by the Department of Examinations under the Ministry of Education. Typically, students take this exam during their final two years of college-level education (Grades 12 and 13, usually at ages 17–19), or as external (non-school) candidates after completing the GCE Ordinary Level exams. The majority of candidates enter the exam through their respective schools, but those who have not completed their school education can also apply as private candidates. The qualification also serves as an entrance requirement for Sri Lankan state universities. The exams are offered in three mediums: Sinhala, Tamil, and English.

== Fields of Study ==
Candidates are expected to study for two years at the higher secondary level (Grade 12 and 13) before taking the examination. The examination covers five major fields of study, and candidates must choose three subjects within one major field.

=== Physical Science stream ===
- Combined Mathematics
- Physics
- Chemistry
- Information and Communication Technology

=== Bio Science stream ===
- Biology
- Chemistry
- Physics
- Agricultural Science

=== Commerce stream ===
- Accounting
- Business Studies
- Economics
- Business Statistics
- Mathematics

=== Arts stream (Social Sciences and Humanities) ===
- Buddhism
- Hinduism
- Islam
- Higher Mathematics
- Business Statistics
- Christianity
- Buddhist Civilization
- Hindu Civilization
- Islam Civilization
- Christian Civilization
- Greek and Roman Civilization
- Mathematics
- Economics
- Languages (Sinhala, Tamil, English, Pali, Sanskrit, Arabic, Hindi, Japanese, Chinese, Korean, Malay, French, German, Russian)
- Political Science
- History (Sri Lankan, Indian, European or of the Modern world)
- Home Economics
- Geography
- Logic and Scientific Method
- Mass Media and Communication Studies
- Aesthetic subjects (Dancing, Music [Western or Carnatic or Eastern], Drama, Arts)
- Agricultural Science

=== Technology stream ===
- Engineering Technology
- Science for Technology
- Bio-system Technology
- Geography
- Agricultural Science
- Mathematics

From the stream of one's choice above, one can choose three subjects related to one of one's preferred streams or 2 subjects from one's major stream and one from another stream. And one can choose two languages if one likes. Additionally, candidates must take a General English test, General Information Technology, and a Common General test. While the result of the General English test and General Information Technology are not considered in the university entrance selection criteria, candidates are expected to obtain a passing mark on the General English and Common General test.

== Exam procedure ==
The exams are conducted each year in August at selected national schools across the country. Invigilators and supervisors, typically qualified teachers from the local school system, are appointed by the Department of Examinations. Candidates are allowed up to three attempts to meet the minimum requirements for university admission and qualify for a state university. The test assessments are carried out by marking panels, usually consisting of qualified and experienced school teachers, who are guided by supervisors, often university lecturers. It takes about 4–5 months for the final results of the island-wide examination to be released. Afterward, candidates typically wait around one year to enter a local university, depending on the university and the course or field of study.

== Science stream ==
=== Physical science stream ===
The Maths stream includes four main subjects: Combined Mathematics, Physics, Chemistry, and Information and Communication Technology (ICT). Under the recent syllabus, candidates can choose between Chemistry and ICT, although Combined Mathematics and Physics are mandatory. Combined Mathematics is a combination of Pure Mathematics and Applied Mathematics. Previously, candidates had to study these two subjects separately, but with the introduction of the Combined Mathematics syllabus, the two subjects were merged and revised.

The curriculum also includes practical experiments that students are expected to conduct in school laboratories.

=== Biological science streams ===
The Biological Science stream consists of four subjects: Biology, Chemistry, Physics and Agricultural Science. Candidates have the option to choose between Physics and Agricultural Science, while Biology and Chemistry are mandatory.

The curriculum also includes practical experiments that students are expected to conduct in school laboratories.

== Commerce stream ==
The Commerce stream has three main subjects: Accounting, Business Studies, and Economics. Candidates have the option to choose between Business Studies or Business Statistics along with Accounting and Economics. And also candidates have the option to choose between Business Studies along with Accounting and Economics. The option to choose between Information and Communication Technology along with Business Studies and Accounting. Candidates have the option to choose between Information and Communication Technology along with Economics and Accounting

== Technology stream ==
The Technology stream was introduced in 2013. The stream consists of three subject categories: A, B, and C. Candidates can select Engineering Technology as a Category B subject, and Information and Communication Technology from the Category C group. Science for Technology (Category B) is a compulsory subject for both Engineering and Bio-system candidates. Since the stream is relatively new, the number of schools with the facilities to teach these subjects is limited or nonexistent in some areas.

== Criticism ==
In recent years, the exam has become extremely competitive and even traumatic for many high school students in Sri Lanka. For the academic year 2013, out of 55,241 candidates who applied for university admission, only 43.8% gained access to state universities through the University Grants Commission (UGC), despite meeting the minimum admission requirements.

According to a 2010 study by Child and Adolescent Psychiatry and Mental Health, symptoms of anxiety and depression were more common among students in GCE Advanced Level classes compared to other grades. Students in Grade 13 had the second-highest depression and anxiety scores, with examination-related issues being the most commonly cited problem. Of the 445 students assessed, 22.9% of Grade 12 students and 28.6% of Grade 13 students reportedly had severe depression, while 28.6% of Grade 12 students and 32.1% of Grade 13 students experienced severe anxiety.

Due to the intimidating nature of the exam, along with family pressure and social stigma associated with the results, many students become severely depressed if they fail to achieve their desired outcomes. Some cases of suicide have even been linked to the exam.

== See also ==
- Education in Sri Lanka
- List of schools in Northern Province, Sri Lanka
- Sri Lankan universities
- Government Schools in Sri Lanka
- GCE Ordinary Level in Sri Lanka
