= GCE Ordinary Level in Sri Lanka =

Educational qualification in Sri Lanka

The Sri Lankan Ordinary Level (O-level) is a General Certificate of Education (GCE) qualification in Sri Lanka, conducted by the Department of Examinations of the Ministry of Education. It was based on the Cambridge University Ordinary Level qualification. An O-level is a qualification of its own right, but more often taken in prerequisite for the more in-depth and academically rigorous Advanced Level exams. The GCE O/L examination determines eligibility to pursue further studies or vocational training courses.

It is usually taken by students during the final two years of Senior secondary school (Grade 10 & 11 (usually ages 15–16)) or by external (non-school) candidates. The exam is usually held in December. The exams are held in three mediums: Sinhala, Tamil and English. The exam is the basic certificate awarded in Sri Lanka as proof of completion of Secondary Education.

== Structure and subjects ==
The G.C.E. (General Certificate of Education) Ordinary Level (O/L) examination consists of six main subjects along with three optional subjects which can be selected according to the candidate’s wish, and altogether 9 subjects.

=== Mandatory subjects ===
- Mother language (Sinhala or Tamil)
- Religion (Buddhism, Catholicism/Christianity, Islam, Shaivism)
- English
- Mathematics
- Science
- History

=== Basket subjects ===
The optional subjects are categorized in to three categories (baskets). Only one subject can be selected from each category. They are as below:

==== First category ====
- Business & Accounting Studies
- Geography
- Civic Education
- Entrepreneurship Studies
- Second Language - Sinhala (For students whose dominant language is Tamil)
- Second Language - Tamil (For students whose dominant language is Sinhala)
- Pali Language
- Sanskrit Language
- French Language
- German Language
- Hindi Language
- Japanese Language
- Arabic Language
- Korean Language
- Chinese Language
- Russian Language

One subject can be selected from the first category.

==== Second category ====
- Eastern Music
- Western Music
- Carnatic Music
- Eastern Dancing
- Bharatha Dancing
- Art
- Appreciation of English Literary Texts (English Literature)
- Appreciation of Sinhala Literary Texts (Sinhala Literature)
- Appreciation of Tamil Literary Texts (Tamil Literature)
- Appreciation of Arabic Literary Texts (Arabic Literature)
- Drama and Theatre

One subject can be selected from the second category.

===== Practical tests =====
In the second category, candidates must face both a practical test and a written test for the subjects Drama and Theatre, Oriental Music, Western Music, Carnatic Music, Oriental Dancing & Baratha Dancing. In Drama and Theatre, candidates will be asked to perform an act-out and sing a song. In Western Music, a candidate could be asked to perform a piece on any given instrument as well as an instrument of their choice. In Dancing, candidates will be asked to perform a dance as well as sing.

There are no practical tests for the Art subject. The candidates face an exam paper and are asked to draw.

For Literature subjects, namely English Literature, Sinhala Literature, Tamil Literature and Arabic Literature, there is not any practical test. Candidates only face a written examination in which their writing abilities are evaluated.

==== Third category ====
- Information & Communication Technology
- Agriculture & Food Technology
- Aquatic Bio resources Technology
- Arts & Crafts
- Home Economics
- Health & Physical Education
- Communication & Media Studies
- Design & Construction Technology
- Design & Mechanical Technology
- Design, Electrical & Electronic Technology
- Electronic Writing & Shorthand

One subject should be selected from the third category.

All the above mentioned subjects are not available in each and every government/state-run school due to lack of teachers, funding and resources.

Table summarising subject choices for the G.C.E. O/L Examination
Mandatory subjects	Basket subjects		
Mandatory subjects	First category	Second category	Third category
Mother language (Sinhalese or Tamil)	Business & Accounting Studies	Eastern Music	Information & Communication Technology
Religion: Buddhism; Catholicism or Christianity; Islam; Shaivism	Geography	Western Music	Agriculture & Food Technology
English Language	Civic Education	Carnatic Music	Aquatic Bio resources Technology
Mathematics	Entrepreneurship Studies	Eastern Dancing	Arts & Crafts
Science	Second Language - Sinhala (For students whose dominant language is Tamil)	Bharatha Dancing	Home Economics
History	Second Language - Tamil (For students whose dominant language is Sinhala)	Art	Health & Physical Education
—N/a	Pali Language	Appreciation of Sinhala Literary Texts (Sinhala Literature)	Communication & Media Studies
—N/a	Sanskrit Language	Appreciation of Tamil Literary Texts (Tamil Literature)	Design & Construction Technology
—N/a	French Language	Appreciation of English Literary Texts (English Literature)	Design & Mechanical Technology
—N/a	German Language	Appreciation of Arabic Literary Texts (Arabic Literature)	Design, Electrical & Electronic Technology
—N/a	Hindi Language	Drama and Theatre	Electronic Writing & Shorthand
—N/a	Japanese Language	—N/a	—N/a
—N/a	Arabic Language	—N/a	—N/a
—N/a	Korean Language	—N/a	—N/a
—N/a	Chinese Language	—N/a	—N/a
—N/a	Russian Language	—N/a	—N/a

=== Reforms ===
Beginning with the tests in 2029, the examination board will administer a total of seven tests per test-taker. In prior years, the total has included nine tests. The initial proposal required five core subjects: English, Math, Mother Tongue (Sinhala or Tamil), Religion, and Science. After published complaints, both History and Aesthetics are also said to be included.

== Grading ==
As of 2026, tests were scored in one of five categories, and obtaining credit for the tested subject required a minimum score of 40%, which is an 'S' score.

2026 grading scale
Percentage correct	Grade	Notes
75–100%	A	Recommended if seeking GCE A/L in biology, physical sciences
65–74.99%	B	Minimum recommended if seeking GCE A/L in technology or commerce
55–64.99%	C	Minimum recommended if seeking GCE A/L in arts, or seeking vocational training
40–54.99%	S	Minimum recommendation for vocational training
75–100%	F	Failure

=== Proposed reforms ===
The 2026 educational reforms include a provision that will change the grading scale from an alphabetic pass-fail system to GPA scores.

Proposed GPA scoring system
Percentage correct	GPA
90–100%	4.0
80–89%	3.7
70–79%	3.3
60-69%	3.0
50-59%	2.7
40-49%	2.0 (Pass)
0-39%	0.00 (Fail)

=== Former grading system ===
Candidates who received a grade of 'W' were considered failed in that particular subject. To be able to pass is to at least have a 'S' in the mandatory subjects.

Mark	Grade Awarded
75 - 100	A
65 - 74	B
50 - 64	C
35 - 49	S
Less than 35	W

The system used to grade students formally in the Sri Lankan GCE O/Level examination before the adoptation of the newer one was as follows:

Mark	Grade Awarded
75 and above	D
50 - 74	C
35 - 49	S
34 and below	F

== See also ==
- Education in Sri Lanka
- GCE Advanced Level in Sri Lanka
- Government Schools in Sri Lanka
- List of schools in Northern Province, Sri Lanka
- Secondary School Certificate
- Sri Lankan universities
