= List of digital repositories in Sri Lanka =

== Science and technology ==
- National Science Foundation of Sri Lanka, National e-Repository

== University ==
- Open University of Sri Lanka e-Repository
- Rajarata University of Sri Lanka
- University of Colombo, Sri Lanka
- University of Moratuwa, Sri Lanka
- University of Peradeniya, Sri Lanka
- University of Ruhuna, Sri Lanka
- University of Sri Jayawardenapura Digital Repository
- University of the Visual and Performing Arts, Sri Lanka, Library e-Repository
