= General Certificate of Education =

Academic qualification in the British Commonwealth

The General Certificate of Education (GCE) is a family of subject-specific academic qualifications used by examination boards in England, Wales, Northern Ireland, Crown dependencies and a few Commonwealth countries. They are not part of the standard Scottish education system.

GCE qualifications are currently offered at three main levels. In increasing order of difficulty, these are as follows:

- GCSEs (General Certificate of Secondary Education)
- AS Levels (GCE Advanced Subsidiary Level), a standalone qualification with content equivalent to the first half of an A-level
- A Levels (GCE Advanced Level), a widely-used university entry and school leaving qualification

In Commonwealth countries, the GCSE is often replaced with international alternatives such as the IGCSE, or the Cambridge O-Level which was originally derived from the now-defunct UK GCE Ordinary Level qualification. Similarly, not all private schools in England use GCSE examinations.

== Development history ==
The General Certificate of Education was introduced in 1951 to replace School Certificates (issued by the Secondary Schools Examinations Council in England and Wales) with national standards for matriculation to university undergraduate courses. The GCE had two levels: Ordinary levels were usually taken at the age of 16, and Advanced levels at the age of 18 after a further two-year course. These quickly became known in the education system as "O-levels" and "A-levels."

From 1965, another qualification, the Certificate of Secondary Education (CSE), was also offered as an alternative to O-levels. It was introduced in England, Wales and Northern Ireland to allow more students to sit public exams and gain qualifications, not only the top academic achievers. Matriculation (the minimum standard for university entrance) was set at five passes in different subjects, of which two had to be at A-level. However, for matriculation purposes, attaining the highest grade in a subject at CSE level was only considered equivalent to a pass at O-level.

In 1988, O-level and CSE examinations were merged and replaced with the General Certificate of Secondary Education (GCSE) in England, designed with a multi-level examination system to suit all abilities of secondary school pupils. Though the O-level was replaced in the English education system in the 1980s, some examination boards continue to offer Ordinary level examinations to English Language schools overseas. This enables these students to obtain matriculation instantly recognisable to British universities.

=== Examination boards ===
In Wales, the GCE was overseen by the Welsh Joint Education Committee, and in Northern Ireland by the Northern Ireland Schools Examination Council (now CCEA). In England, it was run by a number of different examination boards, each of which set their own syllabi and papers. These included the Northern Universities Joint Matriculation Board ("Northern"), the University of London ("The London Board") and the Oxford and Cambridge Board.

=== Exams and grading ===
Examination sessions were held bi-annually in May and November. Successful candidates received a certificate listing the subjects they had passed in the session, together with the marks achieved in each.

In the early years of the GCE system, all subject marks were given as percentages. Later, ordinary level pass marks were graded 1–6, with 1 being the highest. The grading system was further simplified in 1975 when the six pass marks were reduced to three, graded A, B, C. In normalised terms, the lower bound for a grade A at O-level was then 70% and the lower bound for C was 45%. For matriculation purposes C was the lowest pass grade. D, E and F grades were also shown for the first time—indicating that a paper had been sat but the student had not achieved a pass mark.

In the late 1970s, A-level certificates showed grades from A to F. E was considered a pass for matriculation, and corresponded to 30%. All these examinations were closed book, and Art was the only subject for which any assignment outside the examination hall contributed to the final mark.

=== Former GCE qualifications ===
The GCE Ordinary Level (United Kingdom) is discontinued, but international variants are still offered.

The Alternative Ordinary Level (AO Level), was additional GCE qualification available in most subject areas. The AO Level syllabus and examination both assumed a higher degree of maturity on the part of candidates, and employed teaching methods more commonly associated with A Level study. It was therefore sometimes incorrectly referred to as the "Advanced Ordinary Level". The AO Level was discontinued, with final admissions in 1987 and final qualifications awarded in 1988.

In the past, a Scholarship / Special / "S-Level" / Advanced Extension Award (AEA) existed.

An Advanced Supplementary Level qualification was also formerly available (designated "AS Level" but not to be confused with the modern-day AS Level, which is lower than the A Level).

== Use in the United Kingdom ==
=== England and Wales ===
For A-levels, letter grades are used, with A, B, C, D, and E representing a pass and U (unclassified) representing a fail. An even higher A* grade was introduced in 2010 after leading British universities had expressed concerns that the A grade alone would no longer be enough to distinguish the most exceptional candidates.

A new 9-1 grading system for GCSEs was phased in from 2017 (the replacement of A*-U, with U being retained). Grade 9 is situated above the former A*, which is a Grade 8.

=== Northern Ireland ===
The secondary education system in Northern Ireland continues to use the GCE Ordinary and Advanced level system. It also retains selection to grammar school by the AQE examination, a public examination which selects children as suitable for an academic (essentially a liberal arts) secondary syllabus from the age of eleven to eighteen.

=== Scotland ===
Neither GCE Ordinary and Advanced levels nor GCSEs have ever existed within the Scottish Education system. It uses an equivalent, administered by the Scottish Qualification Authority (the SQA). GCSEs are the equivalent to a Scottish National level 5 (Nat5), A Levels are the equivalent to an SQA Highers.

Both more advanced and less advanced examinations are offered by the SQA, National level 3: National level 4 (equivalent to a BTEC), National level 5 (equivalent to GCSE), Higher (equivalent to A Levels), and Advanced higher.

== Worldwide use ==
=== Brunei ===
Most schools in Brunei are now under the GCE system, offering the O-level, A-level, and AS-level. Examinations are conducted by the Examinations Department of Brunei Darussalam.

=== Cameroon ===
In Cameroon, the GCE Ordinary Level examination is a 3-year course program starting from Form 3 to Form 5 (Years 9 to 11). It is usually written in Form 5 (Year 11) in secondary schools, meanwhile the GCE Advanced Level examinations are written in Upper 6 (Year 13) in high school. Most secondary schools in Cameroon which do the English form of education and write both the GCE A-Level and O-Level examinations were boarding schools, but since then many day schools were opened which offered a complete GCE course, and anyone wishing to have an English education is no longer obliged to attend a boarding school. The GCE saw changes in syllabus content at the ordinary and advanced levels in some science subjects in order to adapt to the world's advancing school program.

During Easter break around March, students in these boarding schools stay for GCE courses for a week and a few days in school for extra classes in order to cover up their syllabus. At the end of the school year, all other students leave, while GCE candidates stay on to revise and prepare for the exams in late May. Once the candidates finish writing in early June, they all return to their various homes, waiting to hear their results. The same thing applies for GCE candidates in day schools. The results for the GCE O-Level and A-level exams in Cameroon are announced around 23 July.

=== Hong Kong ===
The two educational qualifications, Hong Kong Certificate of Education Examination (HKCEE) and Hong Kong Advanced Level Examination (HKALE), were the two school-leaving exams until they were replaced by the Hong Kong Diploma of Secondary Education (HKDSE). The HKDSE eventually replaced the two exams by only having one public exam in high school year 3 (year 12). English Schools Foundation (though some schools are also adopting the IB Diploma program).

=== Pakistan ===
Some of Pakistan's top schools offers the GCE certification which are mostly private schools. The number of entries for GCE qualifications for O Levels and A Levels has been increasing in Pakistan. The entries for O Levels qualifications in Pakistan grew by 5% in 2015-16 from the previous year, and increased by 8% for A Levels. O Levels and A Levels are considered to be equivalent to the local board of intermediate and secondary education (BISE) education system in Pakistan.

=== Singapore ===
Students take the O-Levels after completing Secondary 4 at age 16 for the Special and Express streams, or Secondary 5 at age 17 for the Normal Academic Stream. After that, they have the option to go on to a junior college for two years in preparation for the A-Levels or study a vocational trade and earn a diploma at a polytechnic or technical school. Increasingly, students who perform well in school are given the option to bypass the O-levels and take the A-Levels, in a scheme dubbed the integrated programme (also known as the through-train programme).

=== Sri Lanka ===
In Sri Lanka GCE Ordinary Level and GCE Advanced Level examinations are conducted by the Department of Examinations of the Government of Sri Lanka. The GCE(O/L) is normally conducted in the month of December and GCE (A/L)s are conducted in the month of August. They are conducted on an island-wide examination centres on same time. Examination entrance is restricted by a minimal number of formal school going years and laboratory field work. The majority of candidates enter the exams via their respective schools, while candidates who have finished school education can also apply as a private candidate.

The O/L examination is regarded as the qualification examination for starting on GCE(A/L). Specialization streaming is depended on the grades obtained for subjects in the O/L. The country's reputed schools admit students to their A/L, depending on the O/L grades.

The Sri Lankan University Grants commission determines the cut-off points for the selection of students to the Sri Lankan universities according to the grade points obtained in the A/L examinations based on the standard normal distribution.

Private Schools/International Schools in Sri Lanka offer British Ordinary Level and Advanced Level Qualifications that are recognized both locally and internationally. These institutions provide students with the option to pursue either Cambridge International (CIE) qualifications or Pearson Edexcel qualifications for O/L and A/L examinations.

=== Former use ===
GCE examinations in Malaysia used to be conducted by the University of Cambridge Local Examinations Syndicate. Two agencies of the Malaysian Ministry of Education took over the role with UCLES retaining an advisory role on standards.

== Comparisons to international school qualifications ==
=== US high school diploma ===
In the US, the high school diploma is used to qualify for academic admissions. However, in England and Wales, the high school diploma is considered to be at the level of the GCSE. For college and university admissions, the high school diploma may be accepted in lieu of the GCSE if an average grade of C is obtained in subjects with a GCSE counterpart. However, as the more rigorous A Levels are expected for UK university admission, students may participate in the Advanced Placement (AP) or International Baccalaureate (IB) programs to earn additional points on the UCAS Tariff at that level. Alternatively they may opt to take A Level examinations in British international schools or as private candidates. Standardized tests, such as the College Board's SAT and SAT Subject Tests or the ACT, may also be considered.

The Universities and Colleges Admissions Service (UCAS) recommends that in addition to a high school diploma, grades of 3 or above in at least two, or ideally three, Advanced Placement exams may be considered as meeting general entry requirements for admission. The IB Diploma may also be accepted. For College Board tests, a minimum score of 600 or higher in all sections of the SAT or a minimum score of 26 or higher in all sections of the ACT along with a minimum score of 600 in relevant SAT Subject Tests may be considered as meeting general entry requirements for admission.
