= Department of Examinations =

The Department of Examinations is a non-ministerial government department of Sri Lanka and the national examination service. It comes within the purview of the Ministry of Education. The department is responsible for carrying out public examinations such as the General Certificate of Education Ordinary Level (SL) and Advanced Level and other state sector examinations. It also carries out other examinations.

The head of the department is Commissioner General Of Examinations. Commissioners, Deputy Commissioners and Assistant Commissioners of Examination form the assisting body to the Commissioner General.

== See also ==
- Ministry of Education

== External links & reference ==
- Department of Examinations, Sri Lanka
- Public Examination Act of Sri Lanka
