= List of statutory rules and orders of Northern Ireland =

This is an incomplete list of statutory rules and orders of Northern Ireland. Statutory rules and orders were the predecessor of statutory rules and they formed the secondary legislation of Northern Ireland between 1922 and 1973.

== 1922-1929 ==
- List of statutory rules and orders of Northern Ireland, 1922
- List of statutory rules and orders of Northern Ireland, 1923
- List of statutory rules and orders of Northern Ireland, 1924
- List of statutory rules and orders of Northern Ireland, 1925
- List of statutory rules and orders of Northern Ireland, 1926
- List of statutory rules and orders of Northern Ireland, 1927
- List of statutory rules and orders of Northern Ireland, 1928
- List of statutory rules and orders of Northern Ireland, 1929

== 1930-1939 ==
- List of statutory rules and orders of Northern Ireland, 1930
- List of statutory rules and orders of Northern Ireland, 1931
- List of statutory rules and orders of Northern Ireland, 1932
- List of statutory rules and orders of Northern Ireland, 1933
- List of statutory rules and orders of Northern Ireland, 1934
- List of statutory rules and orders of Northern Ireland, 1935
- List of statutory rules and orders of Northern Ireland, 1936
- List of statutory rules and orders of Northern Ireland, 1937
- List of statutory rules and orders of Northern Ireland, 1938
- List of statutory rules and orders of Northern Ireland, 1939

== 1940-1949 ==
- List of statutory rules and orders of Northern Ireland, 1940
- List of statutory rules and orders of Northern Ireland, 1941
- List of statutory rules and orders of Northern Ireland, 1942
- List of statutory rules and orders of Northern Ireland, 1943
- List of statutory rules and orders of Northern Ireland, 1944
- List of statutory rules and orders of Northern Ireland, 1945
- List of statutory rules and orders of Northern Ireland, 1946
- List of statutory rules and orders of Northern Ireland, 1947
- List of statutory rules and orders of Northern Ireland, 1948
- List of statutory rules and orders of Northern Ireland, 1949

== 1950-1959 ==
- List of statutory rules and orders of Northern Ireland, 1950
- List of statutory rules and orders of Northern Ireland, 1951
- List of statutory rules and orders of Northern Ireland, 1952
- List of statutory rules and orders of Northern Ireland, 1953
- List of statutory rules and orders of Northern Ireland, 1954
- List of statutory rules and orders of Northern Ireland, 1955
- List of statutory rules and orders of Northern Ireland, 1956
- List of statutory rules and orders of Northern Ireland, 1957
- List of statutory rules and orders of Northern Ireland, 1958
- List of statutory rules and orders of Northern Ireland, 1959

== 1960-1969 ==
- List of statutory rules and orders of Northern Ireland, 1960
- List of statutory rules and orders of Northern Ireland, 1961
- List of statutory rules and orders of Northern Ireland, 1962
- List of statutory rules and orders of Northern Ireland, 1963
- List of statutory rules and orders of Northern Ireland, 1964
- List of statutory rules and orders of Northern Ireland, 1965
- List of statutory rules and orders of Northern Ireland, 1966
- List of statutory rules and orders of Northern Ireland, 1967
- List of statutory rules and orders of Northern Ireland, 1968
- List of statutory rules and orders of Northern Ireland, 1969

== 1970-1973 ==
- List of statutory rules and orders of Northern Ireland, 1970
- List of statutory rules and orders of Northern Ireland, 1971
- List of statutory rules and orders of Northern Ireland, 1972
- List of statutory rules and orders of Northern Ireland, 1973

== See also ==
- List of statutory rules of Northern Ireland
