= List of statutory rules and orders of Northern Ireland, 1963 =

This is an incomplete list of statutory rules and orders of Northern Ireland during 1962. Statutory rules and orders were the predecessor of statutory rules and they formed the secondary legislation of Northern Ireland between 1922 and 1973.

Number	Title
No. 86	Construction (Lifting Operations) Regulations (Northern Ireland) 1963
No. 87	Construction (General Provisions) Regulations (Northern Ireland) 1963
No. 130	Construction (Lifting Operations) Prescribed Particulars Order (Northern Ireland) 1963
No. 131	Construction (Lifting Operations) Certificates Order (Northern Ireland) 1963
No. 132	Construction (Lifting Operations) Reports Order (Northern Ireland) 1963
No. 180	Lifting Machines (Particulars of Examinations) Order (Northern Ireland) 1963

== See also ==
- List of statutory rules of Northern Ireland
