= List of statutory rules and orders of Northern Ireland, 1939 =

This is an incomplete list of statutory rules and orders of Northern Ireland during 1922. Statutory rules and orders were the predecessor of statutory rules and they formed the secondary legislation of Northern Ireland between 1922 and 1973.

Number	Title
No. 1	
No. 2	The Rate of Payment to Ministry of Commerce (Northern Ireland) 1939
No. 3	The Rates of Interest (Housing) Order (Northern Ireland) 1939
No. 4	The Pigs Marketing (Special Levy) (No. 1) Order (Northern Ireland) 1939
No. 5	The Air-Raid Precautions (Finance) Regulations (Northern Ireland) 1939
No. 6	The Unemployment Insurance (Investment) Regulations (Northern Ireland) 1939
No. 7	The Unemployment Insurance (Employment Outside the UK) Regulations (Northern Ireland) 1939
No. 8	The Importation of Plants Order (Northern Ireland) 1939
No. 9	
No. 10	The New Industries (Development) Regulations (Northern Ireland) 1939
No. 11	The Contributory Pensions (Determination of Income) Amendment Regulations (Northern Ireland) 1939
No. 12	The County Courts: Judges Order (Northern Ireland) 1939
No. 13	The Hackney Carriages (Seating Capacity) Regulations (Northern Ireland) 1939
No. 14	The Electricity Board for Northern Ireland BorRecording (Amendment) Regulations (Northern Ireland) 1939
No. 15 - 18	
No. 19	The Local Government: Rural Districts Invested with Urban Powers Order (Northern Ireland) 1939
No. 20	The Goods Vehicles Regulations (Northern Ireland) 1939
No. 21	The Marketing of Eggs Rules (Northern Ireland) 1939
No. 22	
No. 23	The Contributory Pensions (Special Voluntary Contributors) Regulations (Northern Ireland) 1939
No. 24	The Pigs Marketing Scheme (Amendment) Order (Northern Ireland) 1939
No. 25	
No. 26	The Pigs Marketing (Special Levy) (No. 3) Order (Northern Ireland) 1939
No. 27	The Marketing of Eggs (Retailers' Prices) Rules (Northern Ireland) 1939
No. 28 - 32	
No. 33	The Police Service Superannuation: Form of Declaration Warrant (Northern Ireland) 1939
No. 34	The Milk (Equalisation and Bonus Payments) Regulations (Northern Ireland) 1939
No. 35	
No. 36	The Butter and Cream (Grading and Marking) Amendment Order (Northern Ireland) 1939
No. 37	The Milk and Milk Products (Registration of Premises) Regulations (Northern Ireland) 1939
No. 38 - 40	
No. 41	The Pigs Marketing (Special Levy) (No. 4) Order (Northern Ireland) 1939
No. 42	The Trade Boards (Notices) Regulations (Northern Ireland) 1939
No. 43	The Holidays with pay (Adaptation of Enactments) (Trade Boards) Regulations (Northern Ireland) 1939
No. 44	The County and County Borough Councils (Librarians' Qualifications) Order (Northern Ireland) 1939
No. 45 - 52	
No. 53	The Unemployment Insurance (Increase of Benefits and Reduction in Contributions) (Agriculture) Order (Northern Ireland) 1939
No. 54	The Factories (Dangerous Machines - Training of Young Persons) Order (Northern Ireland) 1939
No. 55	The Factories (First Aid) Order (Northern Ireland) 1939
No. 56	The Factories (Cleanliness of Walls and Ceilings) Order (Northern Ireland) 1939
No. 57	The Factories (Exemption of Hoists) Order (Northern Ireland) 1939
No. 58	The Factories (Fees of Examining Surgeons) Order (Northern Ireland) 1939
No. 59	The Factories (Adaptations under s. 102) Order (Northern Ireland) 1939
No. 60	The Factories (Examination of Young Persons) Order (Northern Ireland) 1939
No. 61	The Factories (Home Work Order Variation) Order (Northern Ireland) 1939
No. 62	The Factories (Washing Facilities - Dermatitis) Order (Northern Ireland) 1939
No. 63	The Factories (Inquiries - Modification and Adaptations) Order (Northern Ireland) 1939
No. 64	The Factories (Conduct of Inquiries) Rules (Northern Ireland) 1939
No. 65	The Factories (Gasholders - Record of Examinations) Order (Northern Ireland) 1939
No. 66	Factories (Chains, Ropes and Lifting Tackle—Register) Order (Northern Ireland) 1939
No. 67	The Factories (Cranes and other Lifting Machines - Register of Examinations) Order (Northern Ireland) 1939
No. 68	The Factories (Night Work of Male Young Persons - Medical Examinations) Regulations (Northern Ireland) 1939
No. 69	The Factories (Modification for Docks, Building and Engineering Construction, etc.) Regulations (Northern Ireland) 1939
No. 70	Factories (Sanitary Accommodation) Regulations (Northern Ireland) 1939
No. 71	The Factories (Intervals for Women and Young Persons) Regulations (Northern Ireland) 1939
No. 72	The Factories (Overtime - Separation of Different Parts or Sets) Regulations (Northern Ireland) 1939
No. 73	Factories (Operations at Unfenced Machinery) Regulations (Northern Ireland) 1939
No. 74	The Factories (Postponement of Certain Requirements) Order (Northern Ireland) 1939
No. 75	The Factories (Protection of Eyes) Regulations (Northern Ireland) 1939
No. 76	The Factories (Laundries - Modification of Hours and Intervals) Regulations (Northern Ireland) 1939
No. 77	The Factories (Notification of Diseases) Regulations (Northern Ireland) 1939
No. 78	The Marketing of Eggs (No. 2) Rules (Northern Ireland) 1939
No. 79	The Public Elementary Schools Amending No. 10 Regulations (Northern Ireland) 1939
No. 80	The Importation of Plants (No. 2) Order (Northern Ireland) 1939
No. 81	The Public Elementary Teachers Superannuation Order in Council (Northern Ireland) 1939
No. 82	
No. 83	The Butter and Cream Marketing Scheme Amendment (No. 1) Order (Northern Ireland) 1939
No. 84	The National Health Insurance (Medical Benefit) Amendment Regulations (Northern Ireland) 1939
No. 85	The Factories (Inspectors' Certificates) Order (Northern Ireland) 1939
No. 86	The Hairdressers: Registration of Premises Regulations (Northern Ireland) 1939
No. 87	
No. 88	The Civil Authorities (Special Powers) Explosive Ingredients Regulations (Northern Ireland) 1939
No. 89	The Exchequer BorRecording and Local Loans Regulations (Northern Ireland) 1939
No. 90	The Government of Northern Ireland 3 3% Stock Regulations (Northern Ireland) 1939
No. 91	The Certificates of Births, Deaths and Marriages (Requisition) Regulations (Northern Ireland) 1939
No. 92	The Road and Railway Transport: Acquisition of Undertakings: Extension of Period Order (Northern Ireland) 1939
No. 93	The Sheep Dipping (Special Regulation) Order (Northern Ireland) 1939
No. 94	The Contributory Pensions (Determination of Income) Regulations (Northern Ireland) 1939
No. 95	The Factories (Forms and Particulars) Order (Northern Ireland) 1939
No. 96	The Motor Cars (Silence Zone) (Portstewart) Regulations (Northern Ireland) 1939
No. 97	The Labourers Order (Northern Ireland) 1939
No. 98	The National Health Insurance (Decision of Questions) Regulations (Northern Ireland) 1939
No. 99	The Pigs Marketing (Special Levy) (No. 5) Order (Northern Ireland) 1939
No. 100	The Bacon Industry (Appointed Day) Order (Northern Ireland) 1939
No. 101	The Bacon Industry (Registered Agreements) Order (Northern Ireland) 1939
No. 102	
No. 103	The Intoxicating Liquor Licences: Rates of Charges Order (Northern Ireland) 1939
No. 104 & 105	
No. 106	The Re-Housing (Grants on Account) Regulations (Northern Ireland) 1939
No. 107	
No. 108	The Live Stock (Boars) Rules (Northern Ireland) 1939
No. 109	The Exportation of Animals (Amendment) Order (Northern Ireland) 1939
No. 110	The Potato Marketing Scheme (Approval) Order (Northern Ireland) 1939
No. 111	The Pigs Marketing (Grading) Order (Northern Ireland) 1939
No. 112	The Pigs Marketing (Additional Licence Fee) Regulations (Northern Ireland) 1939
No. 113	The Bacon Industry (Exempt Sales) Regulations (Northern Ireland) 1939
No. 114	The Bacon Industry (Curers' Levy) Regulations (Northern Ireland) 1939
No. 115	The Bacon Industry (Appointed Day) Order (Northern Ireland) 1939
No. 116	The Milk (Grade A) (Amendment) Regulations (Northern Ireland) 1939
No. 117	The Milk (Grade B) (Amendment) Regulations (Northern Ireland) 1939
No. 118	The Milk (Grade C) (Amendment) Regulations (Northern Ireland) 1939
No. 119	The Road Vehicles (Lurgan) Regulations (Northern Ireland) 1939
No. 120	The Marketing of Eggs (No. 3) Rules (Northern Ireland) 1939
No. 121	The Bacon Industry (Exempt Sales) (No. 2) Regulations (Northern Ireland) 1939
No. 122	The Teachers' (Secondary and Preparatory) Superannuation (Amendment) Scheme (Northern Ireland) 1939
No. 123	The Teachers' (Agricultural and Technical) Superannuation (Amendment) Scheme (Northern Ireland) 1939
No. 124	The Rates of Interest (Housing No. 2) Order (Northern Ireland) 1939
No. 125 & 126	
No. 127	The Civil Defence (Compulsory Area) Order (Northern Ireland) 1939
No. 128	The National Health Insurance (Deposit Contributors Insurance Section) Regulations (Northern Ireland) 1939
No. 129 & 130	
No. 131	The National Health Insurance (Dental Benefit) Regulations (Northern Ireland) 1939
No. 132	The Butter and Margarine (Sales) Regulations (Northern Ireland) 1939
No. 133	The Government of Northern Ireland 3 3% Stock (Sinking Fund) Regulations (Northern Ireland) 1939
No. 134	The Pigs Marketing (Purchase Incidentals) Order (Northern Ireland) 1939
No. 135	The Registration of Births and Deaths (Forms) Order (Northern Ireland) 1939
No. 136	The Civil Defence (Air-Raid Shelter Standards of Expenditure) Regulations (Northern Ireland) 1939
No. 137	The Unemployment Insurance (Special Scheme) (Transfer) Regulations (Northern Ireland) 1939
No. 138	The Unemployment Assistance (Appeal Tribunals) Regulations (Northern Ireland) 1939
No. 139	The Civil Defence (Specified Railway Undertakings) Order (Northern Ireland) 1939
No. 140	The Civil Defence (Approval and Revision of Code) Order (Northern Ireland) 1939
No. 141	The National Health Insurance (Subsidiary Employments) Amendment Order (Northern Ireland) 1939
No. 142	The Unemployment Insurance (Emergency Powers) Regulations (Northern Ireland) 1939
No. 143	The Unemployment Assistance (Prevention and Relief of Distress) Regulations (Northern Ireland) 1939
No. 144	The Rates of Interest (Housing No. 3) Order (Northern Ireland) 1939
No. 145	The Civil Defence (Register of Designated Premises) Order (Northern Ireland) 1939
No. 146	The Parliamentary Grant (Education Authorities) Regulations (Northern Ireland) 1939
No. 147	The Civil Defence (Specified Factory Premises No. 1) Order (Northern Ireland) 1939
No. 148	The Milk (Conditions of Delivery) Regulations (Northern Ireland) 1939
No. 149	The Petty Sessions Clerks and Assistant Petty Sessions Clerks (Appointments) (Amendment) Regulations (Northern Ireland) 1939
No. 150	The National Health Insurance (Deposit Contributors) Regulations (Northern Ireland) 1939
No. 151	
No. 152	The Contributory Pensions (Joint Committee) Regulations (Northern Ireland) 1939
No. 153	The Unemployment Insurance (Insurance Industry Special Scheme) (Variation) Order (Northern Ireland) 1939
No. 154	The Vaughan's Charity (Administration) (Appointed Day) Order (Northern Ireland) 1939
No. 155	The Unemployment Insurance (Employment under Local and Public Authorities) Amendment Regulations (Northern Ireland) 1939
No. 156 - 158	
No. 159	The Black Scab in Potatoes Order (Northern Ireland) 1939
No. 160	The Sea-Fishing Industry (Immature Sea-Fish) Revocation Order (Northern Ireland) 1939
No. 161	
No. 162	The Goods Vehicles (Amendment) Regulations (Northern Ireland) 1939
No. 163	The Factories (Manufacture of Bread, Biscuits and Flour Confectionery) Regulations (Northern Ireland) 1939
No. 164	The Petty Sessions: Districts and Times of Holding Order (Northern Ireland) 1939
No. 165	The Factories (Laundries - Overtime) Regulations (Northern Ireland) 1939
No. 166	The Prisons (Appointment for Particular Localities) Order (Northern Ireland) 1939
No. 167	
No. 168	The Exported Animals (Compensation) (Suspension of Charges) Order (Northern Ireland) 1939
No. 169	The Ulster Savings Certificates (Amendment) Regulations (Northern Ireland) 1939
No. 170	The Ulster Savings Certificates (Price of Issue) Regulations (Northern Ireland) 1939
No. 171	The Intoxicating Liquor (Finance) Rules (Northern Ireland) 1939
No. 172	The Certificates of Births, Deaths and Marriages (Forms of Requisition) Regulations (Northern Ireland) 1939
No. 173 - 176	
No. 177	The Secondary School Examinations Amending No. 3 Regulations (Northern Ireland) 1939
No. 178	The Public Health (Preservatives, etc. in Food) Amendment Regulations (Northern Ireland) 1939
No. 179	The Air Raid Precautions (Loan of Fire Appliances) Regulations (Northern Ireland) 1939
No. 180	
No. 181	The Factories (Forms and Particulars) (No. 2) Order (Northern Ireland) 1939
No. 182	The Road and Railway Transport: Acquisition of Undertakings: Extension of Period Order (Northern Ireland) 1939
No. 183	The Milk (Equalisation Payments) Regulations (Northern Ireland) 1939
No. 184	The Bacon Industry (Exempt Sales) (No. 3) Regulations (Northern Ireland) 1939
No. 185	
No. 186	The Chrysanthemum Midge (Revocation) Order (Northern Ireland) 1939
No. 187	The Teachers' Superannuation (Service in the Reserve and Auxiliary Forces) Scheme (Northern Ireland) 1939
No. 188	The National Health Insurance (Subsidiary Employments) Amendment (No. 2) Order (Northern Ireland) 1939
No. 189	The Importation of Wrapping Materials Amendment Order (Northern Ireland) 1939
No. 190	The Unemployment Insurance (Insurance Industry Special Scheme) (Variation and Amendment) Order (Northern Ireland) 1939
No. 191	The National Health Insurance and Contributory Pensions (Collection of Contributions) Amendment Regulations (Northern Ireland) 1939
No. 192	The Unemployment Assistance (Determination of Need and Assessment of Needs) (Amendment) Regulations (Northern Ireland) 1939
No. 193	The Butter and Margarine (Sales) (No. 2) Regulations (Northern Ireland) 1939
No. 194	The Sale of Ice Cream Regulations (Northern Ireland) 1939
No. 195	The Pigs Marketing Scheme (Amendment) (No. 3) Order (Northern Ireland) 1939
No. 196	
No. 197	The National Health Insurance (Juvenile Deposit Contributors) Regulations (Northern Ireland) 1939
No. 198	The Trade Boards (Appointment of Members) Regulations (Northern Ireland) 1939
No. 199	The Trade Boards (District Trade Committees) Regulations (Northern Ireland) 1939
No. 200	The National Health Insurance (Normal Rate of Remuneration) Order (Northern Ireland) 1939

== See also ==
- List of statutory rules of Northern Ireland
