= List of statutory rules and orders of Northern Ireland, 1961 =

This is an incomplete list of statutory rules and orders of Northern Ireland during 1922. Statutory rules and orders were the predecessor of statutory rules and they formed the secondary legislation of Northern Ireland between 1922 and 1973.

Number	Title
No. 21	The Northern Ireland 3 per cent Loans Stock 1956-1961 (Redemption and Conversion) Regulations (Northern Ireland) 1961
No. 98	Arsenic in Food Regulations (Northern Ireland) 1961

== See also ==
- List of statutory rules of Northern Ireland
