= List of statutory rules and orders of Northern Ireland, 1947 =

This is an incomplete list of statutory rules and orders of Northern Ireland during 1922. Statutory rules and orders were the predecessor of statutory rules and they formed the secondary legislation of Northern Ireland between 1922 and 1973.

Number	Title
No. 1	
No. 2	The Rate of Payment to the Ministry of Commerce (Northern Ireland) 1947
No. 3	The Electricity and Gas (Reduction of Consumption) (Northern Ireland) 1947
No. 4	
No. 5	The Grass Seeds and Fertilizers (Northern Ireland) (Amendment) Order (Northern Ireland) 1947
No. 6	The Injury Warrant (Northern Ireland) 1947
No. 7	
No. 8	The Technical Teachers (Salary Grants) Regulations (Northern Ireland) 1947
No. 9	Kiers Special Regulations (Northern Ireland) 1947
No. 10	The National Insurance (Extension of Unemployment Benefit) Regulations (Northern Ireland) 1947
No. 11	The Utility Furniture (Supply and Acquisition) Order (Northern Ireland) 1947
No. 12	The Factories (Forms and Particulars) Order (Northern Ireland) 1947
No. 13	The Family Allowances (Isle of Man Reciprocal Arrangements) Regulations (Northern Ireland) 1947
No. 14	The Malone Training School Contributions Regulations (Northern Ireland) 1947
No. 15	
No. 16	The National Fire Service (General) Regulations (Northern Ireland) 1947
No. 17	
No. 18	The Baking Wages Council (Northern Ireland) Wages Regulations Order (Northern Ireland) 1947
No. 19	The Health Authorities (Qualifications and Duties of Medical Officers) Regulations (Northern Ireland) 1947
No. 20	The Health and Welfare Authorities (Qualifications and Duties of Officers) Regulations (Northern Ireland) 1947
No. 21	The Warble Fly (Dressing of Cattle) Order (Northern Ireland) 1947
No. 22	The Assurance Companies (Withdrawal of Deposits) Rules (Northern Ireland) 1947
No. 23	The Industrial Assurance (Withdrawal of Deposits) Rules (Northern Ireland) 1947
No. 24	The Assurance Companies (Balance Sheet Certificate) Regulations (Northern Ireland) 1947
No. 25	The Electricity (Reduction of Consumption) Order (Northern Ireland) 1947
No. 26	The Electricity (Reduction of Consumption) (No. 2) Order (Northern Ireland) 1947
No. 27	The National Insurance (Increase of Contributory Pensions) Amendment Regulations (Northern Ireland) 1947
No. 28	The Poultry Diseases Order (Northern Ireland) 1947
No. 29	The Unemployment Insurance (Insurance Industry Special Scheme) (Amendment) Order (Northern Ireland) 1947
No. 30	The Dressmaking and Women's Light Clothing Wages Council Wages Regulation Order (Northern Ireland) 1947
No. 31	The Wholesale Mantle and Costume Wages Council Wages Regulation Order (Northern Ireland) 1947
No. 32	The Housing (Management of Accommodation) (Amendment) Regulations (Northern Ireland) 1947
No. 33	The National Insurance (Waiting Days for Unemployment Benefit) Regulations (Northern Ireland) 1947
No. 34	The Public Elementary School (Teachers' War Service) Regulations 1940, Amending Regulations No. 7 (Northern Ireland) 1947
No. 35	The Linen and Cotton Handkerchief and Household Goods and Linen Piece Goods Wages Council (Northern Ireland) Wages Regulation Order (Northern Ireland) 1947
No. 36	The Linen and Cotton Handkerchief and Household Goods and Linen Piece Goods Wages Council (Northern Ireland) Wages Regulation (Holidays) Order (Northern Ireland) 1947
No. 37	The Newtownhamilton Quarter Sessions and Civil Bill Court (Discontinuance) Order (Northern Ireland) 1947
No. 38	The Electricity (Reduction of Consumption) (Northern Ireland) (Amendment) Order (Northern Ireland) 1947
No. 39	The Ministries (Transfer of Administration of Non-Contributory Old Age Pensions) Order (Northern Ireland) 1947
No. 40	The Binder Twine Control (Northern Ireland) Order (Northern Ireland) 1947
No. 41	The Binder Twine Control (Northern Ireland) (No. 2) Order (Northern Ireland) 1947
No. 42	The Laundry Wages Council (Northern Ireland) Wages Regulation (Holidays) Order (Northern Ireland) 1947
No. 43	The Laundry Wages Council (Northern Ireland) Wages Regulation Order (Northern Ireland) 1947
No. 44	The National Fire Service (General) (No. 2) Regulations (Northern Ireland) 1947
No. 45	The Public Health and Local Government (Transfer of Functions) Order (Northern Ireland) 1947
No. 46	The Ulster Savings Certificates (Seventh Issue) Regulations (Northern Ireland) 1947
No. 47 & 48	
No. 49	The Royal Ulster Constabulary (Women Members) Pay Order (Northern Ireland) 1947
No. 50	The Exchequer (Temporary Investment) Account Regulations (Northern Ireland) 1947
No. 51	The Reserve Fund Regulations (Northern Ireland) 1947
No. 52	The Tuberculosis (Capital Purposes) Fund Regulations (Northern Ireland) 1947
No. 53	The Hat Cap and Millinery Wages Council (Northern Ireland) Wages Regulation Order (Northern Ireland) 1947
No. 54	The Ulster Savings Certificates (Interest) Sinking Fund Regulations (Northern Ireland) 1947
No. 55	The Ulster Savings Certificates (Investment) Regulations (Northern Ireland) 1947
No. 56	The Aerated Waters Wages Council (Northern Ireland) Wages Regulation Order (Northern Ireland) 1947
No. 57	The Unemployment Insurance (Insurance Industry Special Scheme) (Amendment) (No. 2) Order (Northern Ireland) 1947
No. 58	The Importation of Plants Order (Northern Ireland) 1947
No. 59	The National Insurance (Pensions Accounts) Regulations (Northern Ireland) 1947
No. 60	The Shops Regulations (Northern Ireland) 1947
No. 61	The Secondary Teachers' Salaries (War Service) Regulations (Northern Ireland) 1947
No. 62	The Technical Teachers' Salaries (War Service) Regulations (Northern Ireland) 1947
No. 63	The Health and Welfare Authorities (Prior Transfer of Officers) Regulations (Northern Ireland) 1947
No. 64	The Public Health and Local Government (Transfer of Functions) (No. 2) Order (Northern Ireland) 1947
No. 65	The Public Health and Local Government (Transfer of Functions) (No. 3) Order (Northern Ireland) 1947
No. 66	The Drainage (Appointed Day for Transfer of County Council Functions) Order (Northern Ireland) 1947
No. 67 & 68	
No. 69	The Coal Supply (Temporary Provisions) (Northern Ireland) Order (Northern Ireland) 1947
No. 70	The Coleraine Portrush and Portstewart Water Works Joint Board Order (Northern Ireland) 1947
No. 71	The Order providing for the examination of certain Government Accounts by the Comptroller and Auditor-General (Northern Ireland) 1947
No. 72	The National Insurance (Expenses of Administration) Regulations (Northern Ireland) 1947
No. 73	The Mid-Antrim Water Works Joint Board (Northern Ireland) 1947
No. 74	The Rye Grass Seed (Control) Order (Northern Ireland) 1947
No. 75	The Rye Grass (Control of Harvesting) Order (Northern Ireland) 1947
No. 76	The National Insurance (Increase of Contributory Pensions) Amendment Regulations (No. 2) (Northern Ireland) 1947
No. 77	The Dressmaking and Women's Light Clothing Wages Council Wages Regulation (No. 2) Order (Northern Ireland) 1947
No. 78	The Control of BorRecording Order (Northern Ireland) 1947
No. 79	The Increase of Pensions (General) Regulations (Northern Ireland) 1947
No. 80	The Import of Poultry and Eggs Order (Northern Ireland) 1947
No. 81	The Motor Vehicle Licences: Harvesting Operations Concession Order (Northern Ireland) 1947
No. 82	The Fire Services (Northern Fire District and Fire Authority) Order (Northern Ireland) 1947
No. 83	The Fire Services (Southern Fire District and Fire Authority) Order (Northern Ireland) 1947
No. 84	The Fire Services (Western Fire District and Fire Authority) Order (Northern Ireland) 1947
No. 85	The Dangerous Drugs Act (Application) Order (Northern Ireland) 1947
No. 86	The National Insurance (Deposit Contributors) Regulations (Northern Ireland) 1947
No. 87	The Fire Services (Qualifications of Chief Officers and of Fire Officers) Regulations (Northern Ireland) 1947
No. 88	The Technical Teachers (Salary Grants) (No. 2) Regulations (Northern Ireland) 1947
No. 89	The Secondary Teachers (Salaries and Allowances) Regulations (Northern Ireland) 1947
No. 90	The Fire Services (Belfast Fire District and Fire Authority) Order (Northern Ireland) 1947
No. 91	The Secondary Schools (Payment of Grants) Regulations (Northern Ireland) 1947
No. 92	The Emergency Training Regulations (Northern Ireland) 1947
No. 93	The Public Elementary Schools (Salaries and Allowances) (Amendment) Regulations (Northern Ireland) 1947
No. 94	The Public Elementary Schools Regulations 1934 Amending Regulations, No. 24 (Northern Ireland) 1947
No. 95	The Public Elementary School (Teachers' War Service) Regulations,1940, Amending Regulations No. 8 (Northern Ireland) 1947
No. 96	
No. 97	The Order certifying the Rules to be in force in respect of Proceedings in the County Courts under the Dog Races (Restriction) Act (Northern Ireland), (Northern Ireland) 1947
No. 98	The Armagh and Dungannon Water Works Joint Board Order (Northern Ireland) 1947
No. 99	
No. 100	The Furniture (Control of Manufacture and Supply) Order (Northern Ireland) 1947
No. 101	The North Down Water Works Joint Board Order (Northern Ireland) 1947
No. 102	The Government of Northern Ireland 33 per cent. Stock (Sinking Fund) Regulations (Northern Ireland) 1947
No. 103	The Training College Teachers' (Salaries and Allowances) Regulations (Northern Ireland) 1947
No. 104	The Order declaring the prescribed day for the Coleraine, Portrush and Portstewart Water Works Joint Board Order (Northern Ireland) 1947
No. 105	The Intoxicating Liquor (Compensation Charges) Order (Northern Ireland) 1947
No. 106 - 109	
No. 110	The Baking Wages Council Wages (No. 2) Order (Northern Ireland) 1947
No. 111	
No. 112	The Baking Wages Council Order (Northern Ireland) 1947
No. 113	The Factories (Exemption of Hoists) Amendment Order (Northern Ireland) 1947
No. 114	The Teachers' (Public Elementary) Superannuation (Amendment) Scheme (Northern Ireland) 1947
No. 115	The Teachers' (Secondary and Preparatory) Superannuation (Amendment) Scheme (Northern Ireland) 1947
No. 116	The Teachers' (Technical) Superannuation (Amendment) Scheme (Northern Ireland) 1947
No. 117	The Public Elementary Teachers' (Religious Orders) Superannuation Scheme (Northern Ireland) 1947
No. 118	The Dangerous Occurrences (Notification) Regulations (Northern Ireland) 1947
No. 119	The Housing (Grants) Order (Northern Ireland) 1947
No. 120	
No. 121	The Factories (Holidays - different days for different sets) Regulations (Northern Ireland) 1947
No. 122	The Boot and Shoe Repairing Wages Council Wages Regulation Order (Northern Ireland) 1947
No. 123	The Housing (Accounts) Regulations (Northern Ireland) 1947
No. 124	The Superannuation (Allocation of Pension) Rules (Northern Ireland) 1947
No. 125	The Fire Services (Precepts) Regulations (Northern Ireland) 1947
No. 126	The Sheep Dipping (Special Regulations) Order of (Northern Ireland) 1947
No. 127	The National Insurance (Approved Societies) Regulations (Northern Ireland) 1947
No. 128	The Lough Bradon (County Tyrone) Water Works Joint Board Order (Northern Ireland) 1947
No. 129	The Illegitimate Children (Affiliation Orders) Rules (Northern Ireland) 1947
No. 130	The Nursery Schools Regulations (Northern Ireland) 1947
No. 131	The Public Health (Tuberculosis) (Appointed Day No. 3) Regulations (Northern Ireland) 1947
No. 132 - 136	
No. 137	The National Insurance (Voluntary Contributors) Regulations (Northern Ireland) 1947
No. 138	The Standing Passengers (Amendment) Order (Northern Ireland) 1947
No. 139	The Public Services Vehicles (Amendment) Regulations (Northern Ireland) 1947
No. 140	The Brush and Broom Wages Council (Northern Ireland) Wages Regulation (Amendment) Order (Northern Ireland) 1947
No. 141	The Colorado Beetle Order (Northern Ireland) 1947
No. 142	The Public Health (Tuberculosis) Regulations (Northern Ireland) 1947
No. 143	The Government Loans (Reduction in Rate of Interest) No. 3 Order (Northern Ireland) 1947
No. 144	The Government Loans (Local Loans Fees) Regulations (Northern Ireland) 1947
No. 145	
No. 146	The Public Health and Local Government (Transfer of Functions) (No. 4) Order (Northern Ireland) 1947
No. 147	The Public Health and Local Government (Transfer of Functions) (No. 5) Order (Northern Ireland) 1947
No. 148	The Laundry Wages Council (Northern Ireland) Wages Regulation (No. 2) Order (Northern Ireland) 1947
No. 149	The Restriction of Traffic (Revocation) Order (Northern Ireland) 1947
No. 150	The Pensions (Increase) Regulations (Northern Ireland) 1947
No. 151	The Registration of Births and Deaths (Payment of Registrars) Regulations (Northern Ireland) 1947
No. 152	The Factories (Forms and Particulars) (No. 2) Order (Northern Ireland) 1947
No. 153	The Training College Teachers' (Salaries and Allowances) (No. 2) Regulations (Northern Ireland) 1947
No. 154	The Factories (Fees of Examining Surgeons) Order (Northern Ireland) 1947
No. 155	The Retail Bespoke Tailoring Wages Council (Northern Ireland) Wages Regulation Order (Northern Ireland) 1947
No. 156	
No. 157	The Public Health and Local Government (Transfer of Functions) (No. 6) Order (Northern Ireland) 1947
No. 158	The Marketing of Fruit Rules Order (Northern Ireland) 1947
No. 159	The Royal Ulster Constabulary Pay Order (Northern Ireland) 1947
No. 160	The Order nominating Isaac Copeland Esquire to act as Recorder of Londonderry (Sept. 15th) (Northern Ireland) 1947
No. 161	The Boot and Shoe Repairing Wages Council (Northern Ireland) Wages Regulation (No. 2) Order (Northern Ireland) 1947
No. 162	The Domestic Furniture (Utility Mark) Directions (Northern Ireland) 1947
No. 163	The Utility Furniture (Supply and Acquisition) (No. 2) Order (Northern Ireland) 1947
No. 164	
No. 165	The Technical Schools and Classes (Attendance Grants) Regulations (Northern Ireland) 1947
No. 166	The Secondary Schools (Payment of Grants) (No. 2) Regulations (Northern Ireland) 1947
No. 167	The Road Vehicles (Registration and Licensing) Regulations (Northern Ireland) 1947
No. 168	The Fire Services (Duties of Fire Officers) Regulations (Northern Ireland) 1947
No. 169	The Public Health and Local Government (Transfer of Functions) (No. 7) Order (Northern Ireland) 1947
No. 170	The National Insurance (Approved Societies) Regulations (No. 2) (Northern Ireland) 1947
No. 171	
No. 172	The Jurors' Lists : (Remuneration and Expenses) Order (Northern Ireland) 1947
No. 173	The Public Health and Local Government (Transfer of Functions) (No. 8) Order (Northern Ireland) 1947
No. 174	
No. 175	The Technical Schools Examinations Regulation, Amending Regulations (No. 2) (Northern Ireland) 1947
No. 176	The Order Approving Resolutions passed by the Council of the Pharmaceutical Society of Northern Ireland and the Medical Faculty of Queen's University, Belfast amending the Third Schedule to the Medicines, Pharmacy and Poisons Act (Northern Ireland), (Northern Ireland) 1947
No. 177	The Tillage General Order (Northern Ireland) 1947
No. 178	The Public Health and Local Government (Transfer of Functions) (No. 9) Order (Northern Ireland) 1947
No. 179	The Housing Subsidy Order (Northern Ireland) 1947
No. 180	
No. 181	The Bacon Industry (Pig Nutrition) Research Grant) Order (Northern Ireland) 1947
No. 182 & 183	
No. 184	The Minute of the Ministry of Finance directing that the Comptroller and Auditor-General shall examine accounts kept by the Queen's University Belfast Joint Committee for Adult Education (Northern Ireland) 1947
No. 185	The National Insurance (Sickness Visitation) Regulations (Northern Ireland) 1947
No. 186	The Public Health and Local Government (Transfer of Functions) (No. 10) Order (Northern Ireland) 1947
No. 187	The Order made by the Ministry of Home Affairs under Section Ten of the Summary Jurisdiction and Criminal Justice Act (Northern Ireland) 1935 prescribing Petty Sessions districts and Times (Northern Ireland) 1947
No. 188	
No. 189	The Public Service Vehicles (Construction) (Amendment) Regulations (Northern Ireland) 1947
No. 190	The Sugar Confectionery and Food Preserving Wages Council Wages Regulation Order (Northern Ireland) 1947
No. 191	The Malone Training School (Contributions) (No. 2) Regulations (Northern Ireland) 1947
No. 192	
No. 193	The Fishery Development Loans Regulations (Northern Ireland) 1947
No. 194	The Tillage Amendment Order (Northern Ireland) 1947
No. 195	The Regulations prescribing the National Insurance Joint Authority to be a Rule-Making Authority (Northern Ireland) 1947
No. 196	The Permits for Mechanically propelled Vehicles (Expiry of Enactments) Order (Northern Ireland) 1947
No. 197	The County Sanitary Officers Regulations (Northern Ireland) 1947
No. 198	
No. 199	The Birth Certificate (Shortened Form) Regulations (Northern Ireland) 1947
No. 200	The Fishery Development Loans (Fees) Regulations (Northern Ireland) 1947
No. 201	The Intoxicating Liquor (Finance) (Amendment) Rules (Northern Ireland) 1947
No. 202	The Fire Services (Transfer of Functions) (Belfast Fire Authority) Order (Northern Ireland) 1947
No. 203	The Fire Services (Transfer of Functions) (Northern Fire Authority) Order (Northern Ireland) 1947
No. 204	The Fire Services (Transfer of Functions) (Southern Fire Authority) Order (Northern Ireland) 1947
No. 205	The Fire Services (Transfer of Functions) (Western Fire Authority) Order (Northern Ireland) 1947
No. 206	The Fire Services (Appointed Day) Regulations (Northern Ireland) 1947
No. 207	The Fire Services (Standard Fire Provisions) (Northern Fire Authority) Regulations (Northern Ireland) 1947
No. 208	The Fire Services (Standard Fire Provisions) (Southern Fire Authority) Regulations (Northern Ireland) 1947
No. 209	The Fire Services (Standard Fire Provisions) (Western Fire Authority) Regulations (Northern Ireland) 1947
No. 210	The Safeguarding of Employment (Exemption) Order (Northern Ireland) 1947
No. 211	The Building and Improvement Grants (Voluntary Schools) (Emergency) Regulations (Northern Ireland) 1947

== See also ==
- List of statutory rules of Northern Ireland
