= List of statutory rules and orders of Northern Ireland, 1937 =

This is an incomplete list of statutory rules and orders of Northern Ireland during 1937. Statutory rules and orders were the predecessor of statutory rules and they formed the secondary legislation of Northern Ireland between 1922 and 1973.

| Number | Title |
|---|---|
| No. 1 | |
| No. 2 | The Gas Order: Rate of Payment to Ministry of Commerce (Northern Ireland) 1937 |
| No. 3 | The Road and Railway Transport (Pooling Scheme) Order (Northern Ireland) 1937 |
| No. 4 & 5 | |
| No. 6 | The Rates of Interest (Housing) Order (Northern Ireland) 1937 |
| No. 7 | The Movement of Swine (Belfast) Order (Northern Ireland) 1937 |
| No. 8 | The Superannuation (Joint Service) Regulations (Northern Ireland) 1937 |
| No. 9 | |
| No. 10 | The Rural Districts Invested with Urban Powers Order (Northern Ireland) 1937 |
| No. 11 | The Wild Birds Protection Order (Northern Ireland) 1937 |
| No. 12 | The Unemployment Insurance (Private Gardeners Inclusion) Order (Northern Ireland) 1937 |
| No. 13 | |
| No. 14 | The Importation of Dogs and Cats Order (Northern Ireland) 1937 |
| No. 15 | The Sheep Dipping Amendment Order (Northern Ireland) 1937 |
| No. 16 | The Sea-Fishing Industry (Immature Sea-Fish) Order (Northern Ireland) 1937 |
| No. 17 | The Public Elementary Schools Amending No. 4 Regulations (Northern Ireland) 1937 |
| No. 18 | |
| No. 19 | The Pigs Marketing (Grading) (Amendment) Order (Northern Ireland) 1937 |
| No. 20 | The Importation of Plants (Amendment) Order (Northern Ireland) 1937 |
| No. 21 | The District Hospitals (Amendment) Order (Northern Ireland) 1937 |
| No. 22 | The Road Traffic (Pedestrian Crossings) Regulations (Northern Ireland) 1937 |
| No. 23 | The Technical Attendance Grants Amending No. 2 Regulations (Northern Ireland) 1937 |
| No. 24 & 25 | |
| No. 26 | The Unemployment Insurance (Benefit Miscellaneous Provisions) (Amendment) Regulations (Northern Ireland) 1937 |
| No. 27 | The Unemployment Insurance (Additional Days and Waiting Period) Order (Northern Ireland) 1937 |
| No. 28 | The Butter and Cream Marketing Scheme Amendment (No. 1) Order (Northern Ireland) 1937 |
| No. 29 | The Technical Teachers Amending No. 5 Regulations (Northern Ireland) 1937 |
| No. 30 | The Nursery Schools Regulations (Northern Ireland) 1937 |
| No. 31 | The Summary Jurisdiction (Petty Sessions Districts) Order (Northern Ireland) 1937 |
| No. 32 | The Agricultural Produce (Meat Regulation) Rules (Northern Ireland) 1937 |
| No. 33 | |
| No. 34 | The Unemployment Insurance (Insurance Industry Special Scheme) (Variation and Amendment) Order (Northern Ireland) 1937 |
| No. 35 & 36 | |
| No. 37 | The Secondary Teachers Regulations (Northern Ireland) 1937 |
| No. 38 | The Evening Elementary Schools Interim Amending No. 1 Regulations (Northern Ireland) 1937 |
| No. 39 | The Unemployment Insurance (Mixed Employment) Regulations (Northern Ireland) 1937 |
| No. 40 | The Marketing of Dairy Produce (Marketing of Cream) Rules (Northern Ireland) 1937 |
| No. 41 | The Local Carriers Regulations (Northern Ireland) 1937 |
| No. 42 | The Unemployment Insurance (Special Arrangements) Regulations (Northern Ireland) 1937 |
| No. 43 | The Unemployment Insurance (Courts of Referees) Regulations (Northern Ireland) 1937 |
| No. 44 | |
| No. 45 | The Measuring Instruments (Liquid Fuel and Lubricating Oil) Amendment Regulations (Northern Ireland) 1937 |
| No. 46 | The Pig Industry Council (Term and Conditions of Office of Members) Rules (Northern Ireland) 1937 |
| No. 47 | |
| No. 48 | The Marketing of Eggs (Amendment) Rules (Northern Ireland) 1937 |
| No. 49 | The Contributory Pensions (Isle of Man Reciprocal Arrangements) Regulations (Northern Ireland) 1937 |
| No. 50 | The Unemployment Insurance (Payment of Travelling Expenses) Regulations (Northern Ireland) 1937 |
| No. 51 | The Road and Railway Transport: Acquisition of Undertakings: Extension of Period Order (Northern Ireland) 1937 |
| No. 52 | The Sheep Dipping (Special Regulation) Order (Northern Ireland) 1937 |
| No. 53 | The Public Health (Imported Food) Regulations (Northern Ireland) 1937 |
| No. 54 | The Ancient Monuments: Advisory Council Order (Northern Ireland) 1937 |
| No. 55 | |
| No. 56 | The Horse Breeding (Amendment) Rules (Northern Ireland) 1937 |
| No. 57 | The Public Elementary Schools Amending No. 5 Regulations (Northern Ireland) 1937 |
| No. 58 | The Pigs Marketing (Special Levy) (No. 1) Order (Northern Ireland) 1937 |
| No. 59 | The Unemployment Insurance (Benefit) Regulations (Northern Ireland) 1937 |
| No. 60 | The Road and Railway Transport (Pooling Scheme) Order (Northern Ireland) 1937 |
| No. 61 | The Motor Vehicles and Road Traffic Act County Court Rules (Northern Ireland) 1937 |
| No. 62 | The Pigs Marketing (Grading) (Amendment No. 2) Order (Northern Ireland) 1937 |
| No. 63 | The Ancient Monuments: Archaeological Finds Regulations (Northern Ireland) 1937 |
| No. 64 | The New Industries (Development) Regulations (Northern Ireland) 1937 |
| No. 65 | The Marketing of Pigs (Form of Curers' Returns) (Amendment) Regulations (Northern Ireland) 1937 |
| No. 66 | The Intoxicating Liquor: Licences: Rates of Charges Order (Northern Ireland) 1937 |
| No. 67 & 68 | |
| No. 69 | The Malone Training School: Contributions by County Councils Regulations (Northern Ireland) 1937 |
| No. 70 | The Local Government (Postponement of Elections) Order (Northern Ireland) 1937 |
| No. 71 | The Local Government (Elections) Order (Northern Ireland) 1937 |
| No. 72 | The Unemployment Insurance (Mercantile Marine Exclusion) Regulations (Northern Ireland) 1937 |
| No. 73 | The National Health and Unemployment Insurance (Inspectors' Certificates) Regulations (Northern Ireland) 1937 |
| No. 74 | The Agricultural Teachers (Amending) Regulations (Northern Ireland) 1937 |
| No. 75 | |
| No. 76 | The Marketing of Eggs (Purchase by Contract) Rules (Northern Ireland) 1937 |
| No. 77 | The Marketing of Eggs (Amendment) (No. 2) Rules (Northern Ireland) 1937 |
| No. 78 | The Milk (Grade A) (Amendment) Regulations (Northern Ireland) 1937 |
| No. 79 | The Milk (Grade B) (Amendment) Regulations (Northern Ireland) 1937 |
| No. 80 | The Milk (Grade C) (Amendment) Regulations (Northern Ireland) 1937 |
| No. 81 | |
| No. 82 | The Local Government (Procedure of Councils) Order (Northern Ireland) 1937 |
| No. 83 | The Marketing of Fruit Rules (Northern Ireland) 1937 |
| No. 84 | The Residuary Share Suspense Account Regulations (Northern Ireland) 1937 |
| No. 85 | The Unemployment Insurance (Inconsiderable Employments) Regulations (Northern Ireland) 1937 |
| No. 86 | The Parliamentary Grant (Education Authorities) Regulations (Northern Ireland) 1937 |
| No. 87 | The Public Elementary Schools Amending No. 6 Regulations (Northern Ireland) 1937 |
| No. 88 | The Joint Milk Council (Election of Members by Distributors) Regulations (Northern Ireland) 1937 |
| No. 89 | The Secondary School Teachers Regulations (Northern Ireland) 1937 |
| No. 90 - 92 | |
| No. 93 | The Contributory Pensions (Joint Committee) Regulations (Northern Ireland) 1937 |
| No. 94 | The Contributory Pensions (Payments on Death) Regulations (Northern Ireland) 1937 |
| No. 95 | The Pigs Marketing (Special Levy) (No. 2) Order (Northern Ireland) 1937 |
| No. 96 | The Poor Law: General Regulations (Northern Ireland) 1937 |
| No. 97 | The Dangerous Drugs Order in Council (Northern Ireland) 1937 |
| No. 98 | |
| No. 99 | The Petty Sessions: Districts and Times Order (Northern Ireland) 1937 |
| No. 100 | The Contributory Pensions (Approved Societies Returns) Regulations (Northern Ireland) 1937 |
| No. 101 | The Technical School Teachers Regulations (Northern Ireland) 1937 |
| No. 102 | The Slaughtered Animals (Compensation) Act (Northern Ireland) 1928 (Suspension of Charges) Order (Northern Ireland) 1937 |
| No. 103 | The Pigs Marketing (Special Levy) (No. 3) Order (Northern Ireland) 1937 |
| No. 104 | The Marketing of Potatoes Rules (Northern Ireland) 1937 |
| No. 105 | The Railways (Valuation for Rating) Rules (Northern Ireland) 1937 |
| No. 106 | The Contributory Pensions (Notification of Incapacity) Regulations (Northern Ireland) 1937 |
| No. 107 | The Contributory Pensions (Employment under Local and Public Authorities) Order (Northern Ireland) 1937 |
| No. 108 | The National Health Insurance (Employment under Local and Public Authorities) Order (Northern Ireland) 1937 |
| No. 109 | The National Health Insurance (Outworkers) Order (Northern Ireland) 1937 |
| No. 110 | The Marketing of Eggs (Determination of Wholesale Dealers' Prices) Order (Northern Ireland) 1937 |
| No. 111 - 116 | |
| No. 117 | The Teachers' (Secondary and Preparatory) Superannuation (Amendment) Scheme (Northern Ireland) 1937 |
| No. 118 | The Contributory Pensions (Exempt and Excepted Persons) Regulations (Northern Ireland) 1937 |
| No. 119 | The Contributory Pensions (Joint Committee) Regulations (Northern Ireland) 1937 |
| No. 120 | The Milk (Equalisation Payments) Regulations (Northern Ireland) 1937 |
| No. 121 | The Unemployment Insurance (Employment under Local and Public Authorities) Regulations (Northern Ireland) 1937 |
| No. 122 | The Contributory Pensions (Special Voluntary Contributors) Regulations (Northern Ireland) 1937 |
| No. 123 | The Pigs Marketing (Special Levy) (No. 3) Amendment Order (Northern Ireland) 1937 |
| No. 124 | The County Courts: Judges Order (Northern Ireland) 1937 |
| No. 125 | The Milk (Grade C) Regulations (Northern Ireland) 1937 |
| No. 126 | The Contributory Pensions (Death Certificates) Regulations (Northern Ireland) 1937 |
| No. 127 | The Contributory Pensions (Full Time Instruction) Regulations (Northern Ireland) 1937 |
| No. 128 | The Marketing of Eggs (Retailers' Prices) Rules (Northern Ireland) 1937 |
| No. 129 | The Marketing of Eggs (Retailers' Prices) (No. 2) Rules (Northern Ireland) 1937 |
| No. 130 | The Road Vehicles (Part Year Licensing) Order (Northern Ireland) 1937 |
| No. 131 | The Milk (Equalisation Payments) Regulations (Northern Ireland) 1937 |
| No. 132 | The Summary Jurisdiction (Petty Sessions Districts) (No. 2) Order (Northern Ireland) 1937 |
| No. 133 | The Public Health (Imported Food) Regulations (Northern Ireland) 1937 |
| No. 134 | The Public Service Vehicles and Goods Vehicles (Drivers' Hours of Duty) (Amendment) Regulations (Northern Ireland) 1937 |
| No. 135 | The Contributory Pensions (Patients of Unsound Mind) Regulations (Northern Ireland) 1937 |
| No. 136 | The Contributory Pensions (Determination of Income) Regulations (Northern Ireland) 1937 |
| No. 137 | The Contributory Pensions (Calculation of Contributions) Regulations (Northern Ireland) 1937 |
| No. 138 & 139 | |
| No. 140 | The Contributory Pensions (Procedure on References) Regulations (Northern Ireland) 1937 |
| No. 141 | The Summary Jurisdiction (Petty Sessions Districts) (No. 3) Order (Northern Ireland) 1937 |
| No. 142 | The Petty Sessions: Districts and Times Order (Northern Ireland) 1937 |
| No. 143 | |
| No. 144 | The Non-Contributory Old Age Pensions Regulations (Northern Ireland) 1937 |
| No. 145 | The National Health Insurance (Sickness Visitation) Regulations (Northern Ireland) 1937 |
| No. 146 | |
| No. 147 | The Road and Railway Transport: Acquisition of Undertakings Order (Northern Ireland) 1937 |
| No. 148 | The Unemployment Insurance (Contributions) Regulations (Northern Ireland) 1937 |
| No. 149 | The Unemployment Insurance (Special Arrangements) (Amendment) Regulations (Northern Ireland) 1937 |
| No. 150 - 155 | |
| No. 156 | The Civil Authorities (Special Powers) Refusal to Recognise Court Order (Northern Ireland) 1937 |
| No. 157 | The Butter and Margarine (Sales) Regulations (Northern Ireland) 1937 |

== See also ==
- List of statutory rules of Northern Ireland
