= List of statutory rules and orders of Northern Ireland, 1949 =

This is an incomplete list of statutory rules and orders of Northern Ireland during 1922. Statutory rules and orders were the predecessor of statutory rules and they formed the secondary legislation of Northern Ireland between 1922 and 1973.

Number	Title
No. 1 & 2	
No. 3	The Industrial Assurance (Premium Receipt Books) Regulations (Northern Ireland) 1949
No. 4	
No. 5	The Health Services (Dental Estimates Committee) (Fees) Regulations (Northern Ireland) 1949
No. 6	
No. 7	The Factories (Forms and Particulars) Order (Northern Ireland) 1949
No. 8	The Mental Health Services Capital Fund Regulations (Northern Ireland) 1949
No. 9	The Health Services (Superannuation) (Amendment) Regulations (Northern Ireland) 1949
No. 10	The Health Services (Hospital Management Committees) Regulations (Northern Ireland) 1949
No. 11	The Tourist Traffic (Finance) Regulations (Northern Ireland) 1949
No. 12	The State Exhibitions (Amendment) Regulations (Northern Ireland) 1949
No. 13	
No. 14	The Mental Health (Institutions) Order (Northern Ireland) 1949
No. 15	The Factories (Work in Underground Rooms - Form of Notice) Order (Northern Ireland) 1949
No. 16	
No. 17	The National Insurance and Industrial Injuries (Inspectors' Powers) Regulations (Northern Ireland) 1949
No. 18	The Electoral (Local Government Elections) Regulations (Northern Ireland) 1949
No. 19	
No. 20	The Electoral Register (Postponement of Publication) Order (Northern Ireland) 1949
No. 21	The Public Health (Tuberculosis) Regulations (Northern Ireland) 1949
No. 22	The Control of Building Operations Order (Northern Ireland) 1949
No. 23	The Industries Development Loans Transfer Order (Northern Ireland) 1949
No. 24	
No. 25	The Fire Services (Standard Fire Provision) (Belfast Fire Authority) Regulations (Northern Ireland) 1949
No. 26	The Grass Seeds and Fertilisers General Order (Northern Ireland) 1949
No. 27	The Ulster Savings Certificates - National Defence Issue (Northern Ireland) 1949
No. 28	The Trunk Roads (Designation of Routes) Order (Northern Ireland) 1949
No. 29	The Baking Wages Council Wages Regulations (Holidays) Order (Northern Ireland) 1949
No. 30	The Boot and Shoe Repairing Wages Council Wages Regulations (Amendment) Order (Northern Ireland) 1949
No. 31	The Rope, Twine and Net Wages Council Wages Regulations Order (Northern Ireland) 1949
No. 32	The Trunk Roads (Delegation of Powers) Order (Northern Ireland) 1949
No. 33	The Local Government (Finance) Regulations (Northern Ireland) 1949
No. 34	The Control of Fertilisers (Revocation) Order (Northern Ireland) 1949
No. 35	The Petroleum-Spirit (Conveyance) Regulations (Northern Ireland) 1949
No. 36	The Training Colleges (Admission of Students) Regulations (Northern Ireland) 1949
No. 37	The Retail Bespoke Tailoring Wages Council (Constitution) Order (Northern Ireland) 1949
No. 38	
No. 39	The Local Government (Procedure of Councils) Order (Northern Ireland) 1949
No. 40	The Health Services (Constitution of the Northern Ireland General Health Services Board) Order (Northern Ireland) 1949
No. 41 - 43	
No. 44	The Laundry Wages Council Wages Regulations Order (Northern Ireland) 1949
No. 45	The Increase of Pensions (General) Regulations (Northern Ireland) 1949
No. 46	The Health Services (Travelling Expenses) Regulations (Northern Ireland) 1949
No. 47	The Furniture (Utility Mark) Order (Northern Ireland) 1949
No. 48	The National Insurance (Modification of the Superannuation Acts) (Amendment) Regulations (Northern Ireland) 1949
No. 49	The Industrial Assurance (Returns) Regulations (Northern Ireland) 1949
No. 50	The National Insurance (Mariners) Amendment Regulations (Northern Ireland) 1949
No. 51	The Ministry of Finance Water Supplies and Sewerage Fund Regulations (Northern Ireland) 1949
No. 52	The Salaries and Allowances (Amendment No. 1) Regulations (Northern Ireland) 1949
No. 53	The Fire Services (Qualifications of Chief Officers and of Fire Officers) Regulations (Northern Ireland) 1949
No. 54	
No. 55	The Technical School Examinations (Amendment) (No. 3) Regulations (Northern Ireland) 1949
No. 56	The Bee Pest Prevention Regulations (Northern Ireland) 1949
No. 57	
No. 58	The Agricultural Development Loans Regulations (Northern Ireland) 1949
No. 59	The State Exhibitions (Amendment) (No. 2) Regulations (Northern Ireland) 1949
No. 60	
No. 61	The Health Services (Approval of Hospital Management Schemes) Order (Northern Ireland) 1949
No. 62	The Lurgan and District Waterworks Joint Board Order (Northern Ireland) 1949
No. 63	The Baking Wages Council Wages Regulations (No. 1) Order (Northern Ireland) 1949
No. 64	The Baking Wages Council Wages Regulations (No. 2) Order (Northern Ireland) 1949
No. 65	The Baking Wages Council Wages Regulations (No. 3) Order (Northern Ireland) 1949
No. 66	The Coal Supply (Temporary Provisions) Order (Northern Ireland) 1949
No. 67	The Gas Charges Order (Northern Ireland) 1949
No. 68	The Industrial Assurance and Friendly Societies (Great Britain and Isle of Man) Order (Northern Ireland) 1949
No. 69	The Linen and Cotton Handkerchief and Household Goods and Linen Piece Goods Wages Council Wages Regulations (Amendment) Order (Northern Ireland) 1949
No. 70	The Teachers' Salaries and Superannuation (War Service) Act (End of Emergency) Order (Northern Ireland) 1949
No. 71	The Road Authorities (Compulsory Acquisition of Land) Regulations (Northern Ireland) 1949
No. 72	The Health Services (Approval of Hospital Management Schemes) (No. 2) Order (Northern Ireland) 1949
No. 73	The National Insurance (Industrial Injuries) (Benefit) Amendment Regulations (Northern Ireland) 1949
No. 74	The National Insurance (Claims and Payments) Amendment Regulations (Northern Ireland) 1949
No. 75	The National Insurance (Maternity Benefit) Amendment Regulations (Northern Ireland) 1949
No. 76	The Welfare Authorities (Charges for Residential Accommodation) Regulations (Northern Ireland) 1949
No. 77	The Order in Council under the Medicines, Pharmacy and Poisons Act (Northern Ireland) 1949
No. 78	The Health Services (General Dental Services) (Amendment) Regulations (Northern Ireland) 1949
No. 79	The Petroleum (Carbide of Calcium) Order (Northern Ireland) 1949
No. 80	The Petroleum (Inflammable Liquids and Other Dangerous Substances) Order (Northern Ireland) 1949
No. 81	The Control of Agricultural Machinery (Revocation) Order (Northern Ireland) 1949
No. 82	The National Insurance and Industrial Injuries (Reciprocal Agreement with Eire) Order (Northern Ireland) 1949
No. 83	The National Insurance (Isle of Man Reciprocal Agreement) Order (Northern Ireland) 1949
No. 84	The National Insurance (Industrial Injuries) (Isle of Man Reciprocal Agreement) Order (Northern Ireland) 1949
No. 85 & 86	
No. 87	The Health Services (General Dental Services) (Amendment) (No. 2) Regulations (Northern Ireland) 1949
No. 88	The Raw Opium Regulations (Northern Ireland) 1949
No. 89	The Dangerous Drugs Regulations (Northern Ireland) 1949
No. 90	The Mental Health (No. 5) Regulations (Northern Ireland) 1949
No. 91 - 93	
No. 94	The Brush and Broom Wages Council Wages Regulations (Amendment) Order (Northern Ireland) 1949
No. 95	
No. 96	The Intoxication Liquor (Compensation Charges) Order (Northern Ireland) 1949
No. 97	The Industrial Assurance (Newspaper Advertisement) Order (Northern Ireland) 1949
No. 98	The Technical School Examinations (Amendment) (No. 4) Regulations (Northern Ireland) 1949
No. 99	
No. 100	The Primary Schools (General) Regulations (Northern Ireland) 1949
No. 101	The Teachers' Salaries (Abatement During Absence Owing to Illness) Regulations (Northern Ireland) 1949
No. 102	The Binder Twine Control (Revocation) Order (Northern Ireland) 1949
No. 103	The Housing (Grants) Order (Northern Ireland) 1949
No. 104	The Industrial Assurance and Friendly Societies (Death Certificates) Regulations (Northern Ireland) 1949
No. 105	The Poisons Regulations (Northern Ireland) 1949
No. 106	The Linen and Cotton Handkerchief and Household Goods and Linen Piece Goods Wages Council Wages Regulations (Amendment) (No. 2) Order (Northern Ireland) 1949
No. 107	
No. 108	The Chartered and Other Bodies (Temporary Provisions) Act (Northern Ireland) 1940 (End of Emergency) Order (Northern Ireland) 1949
No. 109	The Armagh and Dungannon Waterworks Joint Board (Amendment) Order (Northern Ireland) 1949
No. 110	The Local Carriers (Revocation of Licences) Regulations (Northern Ireland) 1949
No. 111	The Health Services (Constitution of the Northern Ireland General Health Services Board) (No. 2) Order (Northern Ireland) 1949
No. 112	The Baking Wages Council Wages Regulations (Amendment) (No. 3) Order (Northern Ireland) 1949
No. 113	
No. 114	The Grammar School (Grant Conditions) Amendment Regulations (Northern Ireland) 1949
No. 115	The Baking Wages Council Wages Regulations (Amendment) (No. 2) Order (Northern Ireland) 1949
No. 116	The Baking Wages Council Wages Regulations (Amendment) (No. 1) Order (Northern Ireland) 1949
No. 117	The Tourist Development Loans Regulations (Northern Ireland) 1949
No. 118	
No. 119	The Audit - Examination of Accounts - Land Registry Insurance Fund (Northern Ireland) 1949
No. 120	The National Insurance (Residence and Persons Abroad) Amendment Regulations (Northern Ireland) 1949
No. 121	The Trade Scholarships (Amendment) Regulations (Northern Ireland) 1949
No. 122	The Housing Subsidy Order (Northern Ireland) 1949
No. 123	The National Insurance (Contributions) Amendment Regulations (Northern Ireland) 1949
No. 124	The National Insurance (Pensions Existing Beneficiaries and Other Persons) (Transitional) Amendment Regulations (Northern Ireland) 1949
No. 125	The Dressmaking and Women's Light Clothing Wages Council (Constitution) Order (Northern Ireland) 1949
No. 126	The Ulster Savings Certificates: Fourth Issue (Northern Ireland) 1949
No. 127	
No. 128	The Public Health and Local Government (Claims Tribunal Expenses) Order (Northern Ireland) 1949
No. 129	The National Insurance (Unemployment Benefit) (Transitional) Amendment Regulations (Northern Ireland) 1949
No. 130	The National Insurance (Pensions Existing Contributors) (Transitional) Amendment Regulations (Northern Ireland) 1949
No. 131	The Public Service Vehicles (Construction) (Amendment) Regulations (Northern Ireland) 1949
No. 132	The Road Vehicles (Portstewart) Regulations (Northern Ireland) 1949
No. 133	The Factories (Certificates of Fitness of Young Persons) Rules (Northern Ireland) 1949
No. 134	The Factories, (Certificates of Fitness of Young Persons) (Adaptation) Regulations (Northern Ireland) 1949
No. 135	The Factories (Certificates of Fitness of Young Persons) (Prescribed Period) Order (Northern Ireland) 1949
No. 136	The Marketing of Fruit Rules (Northern Ireland) 1949
No. 137	The Ulster Savings Certificates: Second Issue (Northern Ireland) 1949
No. 138	The Ulster Savings Certificates: First Issue (Northern Ireland) 1949
No. 139	The Baking Wages Council (Northern Ireland) Wages Regulations (Amendment) (No. 4) Order (Northern Ireland) 1949
No. 140	The National Insurance (Unemployment Benefit) (Transitional) Amendment Regulations (No. 2) (Northern Ireland) 1949
No. 141	The National Insurance (Sickness Benefit, Maternity Benefit and Miscellaneous Provisions) (Transitional) Amendment Regulations (Northern Ireland) 1949
No. 142	The National Insurance (Death Grant) Regulations (Northern Ireland) 1949
No. 143	The Health Services (General Medical and Pharmaceutical Services) (Amendment) Regulations (Northern Ireland) 1949
No. 144	The Acquisition of Land (Assessment of Compensation) Fees Amendment Rules (Northern Ireland) 1949
No. 145	
No. 146	The Sheep Dipping (Special Regulations) (Northern Ireland) 1949
No. 147	The Civil Authorities (Special Powers) Acts (Northern Ireland) 1922 to (Northern Ireland) 1949
No. 148	The National Insurance (Medical Certification) Amendment Regulations (Northern Ireland) 1949
No. 149	The National Insurance (Contributions) Amendment (No. 2) Regulations (Northern Ireland) 1949
No. 150	The Shirtmaking Wages Council (Northern Ireland) Wages Regulations (Holidays) Order (Northern Ireland) 1949
No. 151	The Marketing of Ryegrass Seed Regulations (Northern Ireland) 1949
No. 152	The Magilligan Bay (Seine Net Restriction) Order (Northern Ireland) 1949
No. 153	The Readymade and Wholesale Bespoke Tailoring Wages Council (Northern Ireland) Wages Regulations (Holiday) (Northern Ireland) 1949
No. 154	The National Insurance (Overlapping Benefits) Regulations (Northern Ireland) 1949
No. 155	The Superannuation (Reckoning of Teaching Service) Regulations (Northern Ireland) 1949
No. 156	The Superannuation (Approved Employment) Rules (Northern Ireland) 1949
No. 157	The Wholesale Mantle and Costume Wages Council (Northern Ireland) Wages Regulations (Holiday) (Northern Ireland) 1949
No. 158	The National Insurance (Industrial Injuries) (Insurable and Excepted Employments) Amendment Regulations (Northern Ireland) 1949
No. 159	The National Insurance (Pensions, Existing Contributors) (Transitional) Amendment (No. 2) Regulations (Northern Ireland) 1949
No. 160	The Aerated Waters Wages Council (Northern Ireland) Wages Regulations (Holidays) (Northern Ireland) 1949
No. 161	The National Insurance (Hospital In-Patients) Regulations (Northern Ireland) 1949
No. 162	The National Insurance (Hospital In-Patients) Amendment Regulations (Northern Ireland) 1949
No. 163 - 165	
No. 166	The Safe Milk Order No. 1 (Northern Ireland) 1949
No. 167	The Paper Box Wages Council (Northern Ireland) Wages Regulations (Amendment) (Northern Ireland) 1949
No. 168	The Aerated Waters Wages Council (Northern Ireland) Wages Regulations (Northern Ireland) 1949
No. 169	The Factories (Milk and Cheese Factories - Hours of Women and Young Persons) Regulations (Northern Ireland) 1949
No. 170	The Paper Box Wages Council (Northern Ireland) (Constitution) Order (Northern Ireland) 1949
No. 171	The Readymade and Wholesale Bespoke Tailoring Wages Council (Northern Ireland) (Constitution) (Northern Ireland) 1949
No. 172	The Linen and Cotton Embroidery Wages Council (Northern Ireland) (Constitution) Order (Northern Ireland) 1949
No. 173	The National Insurance (Industrial Injuries) (Prescribed Diseases) Amendment Regulations (Northern Ireland) 1949
No. 174	The Importation of Forest Trees (Prohibition) (Northern Ireland) Order (Northern Ireland) 1949
No. 175	The Intermediate School (Grant Conditions) Amendment Regulations (Northern Ireland) 1949
No. 176	The Health Services - General Scheme: Modification Order (Northern Ireland) 1949
No. 177 - 179	
No. 180	The Black Scab in Potatoes Order (Northern Ireland) 1949
No. 181	The Health Services (Constitution of the Northern Ireland General Health Services Board) (No. 3) (Northern Ireland) 1949
No. 182	The Road Vehicles Lighting (Amendment) Regulations (Northern Ireland) 1949
No. 183	The Sugar Confectionery and Food Preserving Wages Council (Northern Ireland) Wages Regulations Order (Northern Ireland) 1949
No. 184	The Ryegrass Seed (Exemption) Order (Northern Ireland) 1949
No. 185	
No. 186	The Registration of Births and Deaths (Forms) Order (Northern Ireland) 1949
No. 187	The Training Colleges (Scholarships) Amendment Regulations (Northern Ireland) 1949
No. 188	
No. 189	The Hat, Cap and Millinery Wages Council (Northern Ireland) (Constitution) Order (Northern Ireland) 1949
No. 190	The Factories (Breathing Apparatus etc. - Report on Examination) Order (Northern Ireland) 1949
No. 191	The Diseases of Animals Acts (Application to Poultry) Order (Northern Ireland) 1949
No. 192	The Diseases of Animals (Poultry) Order (Northern Ireland) 1949
No. 193	The Waste of Fuel (Revocation) Order (Northern Ireland) 1949
No. 194	The National Insurance (Claims and Payments) Amendment (No. 2) Regulations (Northern Ireland) 1949
No. 195	The National Insurance (General Benefit) Amendment Regulations (Northern Ireland) 1949
No. 196	The National Insurance (General Benefit) Amendment (No. 2) Regulations (Northern Ireland) 1949
No. 197	The National Insurance (Unemployment and Sickness Benefit) Amendment Regulations (Northern Ireland) 1949
No. 198	The Marketing of Fruit (Amendment) Rules (Northern Ireland) 1949
No. 199	The Dressmaking and Women's Light Clothing Wages Council (Northern Ireland) Wages Regulations (Holiday) Order (Northern Ireland) 1949
No. 200	The Malone Training School (Contributions) Regulations (Northern Ireland) 1949
No. 201	The Flax (General) Regulations (Northern Ireland) 1949
No. 202	The Black Scab in Potatoes (Northern Ireland) No. 2 (Northern Ireland) 1949
No. 203	The Importation of Plants (Amendment) Order (Northern Ireland) 1949
No. 204	The Training Colleges (Admission of Students) Regulations No. 2 (Northern Ireland) 1949
No. 205	The Motor Cars (Use and Construction) (Amendment) (Northern Ireland) Regulations (Northern Ireland) 1949
No. 206 - 209	
No. 210	The Ulster Transport Authority (Terms and Conditions of Employment) Regulations (Northern Ireland) 1949
No. 211	The Royal Ulster Constabulary Pensions Order (Northern Ireland) 1949
No. 212	The Bacon Industry (Investment in Bacon Factory and Pig Husbandry Research Grant) Order (Northern Ireland) 1949
No. 213	The Nurses (Licensing of Agencies) (Appeals) Rules (Northern Ireland) 1949
No. 214	The Linen and Cotton Handkerchief and Household Goods and Linen Goods Wages Council Constitution Order (Northern Ireland) 1949
No. 215	The Linen and Cotton Handkerchief and Household Goods and Linen Piece Goods Wages Council Wages Regulations (Amendment) (No. 3) Order (Northern Ireland) 1949
No. 216	The Sugar Confectionery and Food Preserving Wages Council (Northern Ireland) Wages Regulations (Amendment) Order (Northern Ireland) 1949
No. 217	The Sugar Confectionery and Food Preserving Wages Council (Northern Ireland) Wages Regulations (Holiday) Order (Northern Ireland) 1949
No. 218	The Baking Wages Council Wages Regulations (Amendment) (No. 5) Order (Northern Ireland) 1949
No. 219	The Baking Wages Council Wages Regulations (No. 4) Order (Northern Ireland) 1949
No. 220	The General Waste Material Reclamation Wages Council Wages Regulations (No. 2) (Northern Ireland) 1949
No. 221	The County Committees of Agriculture (Dissolution) Order (Northern Ireland) 1949

== See also ==
- List of statutory rules of Northern Ireland
