= List of statutory rules and orders of Northern Ireland, 1955 =

This is an incomplete list of statutory rules and orders of Northern Ireland during 1955. Statutory rules and orders were the predecessor of statutory rules and they formed the secondary legislation of Northern Ireland between 1922 and 1973.

Number	Title
No. 1	
No. 2	The Training College Teachers (Salaries and Allowances) Regulations (Northern Ireland) 1955
No. 3	The Building and Alteration Grants Amending Regulations (Northern Ireland) (Voluntary Schools - Primary, Intermediate and Special) (Northern Ireland) 1955
No. 4	The Headage Payments (Cattle) No. 1 Scheme (Northern Ireland) 1955
No. 5	
No. 6	The Bee Pest Prevention (Amendment) Regulations (Northern Ireland) 1955
No. 7	The National Insurance (Increase of Benefit and Miscellaneous Provisions) Regulations (Northern Ireland) 1955
No. 8	The National Insurance (Increase of Benefit and Miscellaneous Provisions) (Transitional) Regulations (Northern Ireland) 1955
No. 9	The Licence Duty (Hotels and Restaurants) Regulations (Northern Ireland) 1955
No. 10	The Licensing (Valuation) Regulations (Northern Ireland) 1955
No. 11	The Club Duty (Discontinued Clubs) Regulations (Northern Ireland) 1955
No. 12	The Foyle Area (Licensing of Fishing Enquiries) Regulations (Northern Ireland) 1955
No. 13	The National Assistance (Determination of Need) Amendment Regulations (Northern Ireland) 1955
No. 14	The National Insurance and Industrial Injuries (Commencement) Order (Northern Ireland) 1955
No. 15	The National Insurance (Industrial Injuries) (Increase of Benefit Miscellaneous Provisions) Regulations (Northern Ireland) 1955
No. 16	The Order amending the Third Schedule to the Medicines, Pharmacy and Poisons Act (Northern Ireland) 1955
No. 17	
No. 18	The Boot and Shoe Repairing Wages Council (Northern Ireland) Wages Regulations (Amendment) Order (Northern Ireland) 1955
No. 19	The National Insurance (Unemployment and Sickness Benefit) Amendment Regulations (Northern Ireland) 1955
No. 20 & 21	
No. 22	The Agricultural Development (Eradication of Rushes on Marginal Land) Extension (Northern Ireland) 1955
No. 23	
No. 24	The National Insurance (Unemployment Benefit) (Transitional) Amendment Regulations (Northern Ireland) 1955
No. 25	The Headage Payments (Cattle and Sheep) No. 2 Scheme (Northern Ireland) 1955
No. 26	The Laundry Wages Council (Northern Ireland) Wages Regulations (Amendment) Order (Northern Ireland) 1955
No. 27	
No. 28	The Housing on Farms (Grants) Order (Northern Ireland) 1955
No. 29	The Housing on Farms (Grants) (No. 2) Order (Northern Ireland) 1955
No. 30	The Queen's University of Belfast (Trusts Scheme) Order (Northern Ireland) 1955
No. 31	
No. 32	The Welfare Authorities (Charges For Residential Accommodation) Regulations (Northern Ireland) 1955
No. 33	The Linen and Cotton Handkerchief and Household Goods and Linen Piece Goods Wages Council Wages Regulations (Amendment) Order (Northern Ireland) 1955
No. 34	The Linen and Cotton Embroidery Wages Council (Northern Ireland) Wages Regulations Order (Northern Ireland) 1955
No. 35 - 37	
No. 38	The Importation of Plants Order (Northern Ireland) 1955
No. 39	
No. 40	The Summary Jurisdiction: Petty Sessions Districts and Times: Newtownbreda Order (Northern Ireland) 1955
No. 41	The Health Services (General Medical and Pharmaceutical Services) (Amendment) Regulations (Northern Ireland) 1955
No. 42	The Training Schools (Contributions by Local Authorities) Regulations (Northern Ireland) 1955
No. 43	The Milk Marketing Scheme (Approval) Order (Northern Ireland) 1955
No. 44	
No. 45	The National Assistance (Determination of Need) Amendment (No. 2) Regulations (Northern Ireland) 1955
No. 46	The Administration of Justice (Criers at Sessions) Order (Northern Ireland) 1955
No. 47	The Non-Contributory Old Age Pensions (Amendment) Regulations (Northern Ireland) 1955
No. 48	
No. 49	The Aid to Industry (Amendment) (No. 2) Order (Northern Ireland) 1955
No. 50	The Parliamentary Grants (Local Education Authorities) Amendment Regulations (Northern Ireland) 1955
No. 51	The Voluntary Grammar Schools Milk and Meals Grants Regulations (Northern Ireland) 1955
No. 52	The Milk and Meals Regulations (Northern Ireland) 1955
No. 53	The Electoral (Local Government Elections) (Amendment) Regulations (Northern Ireland) 1955
No. 54	The Forestry (Tollymore Park) Regulations (Northern Ireland) 1955
No. 55	
No. 56	The Water Supplies and Sewerage County Court Rules (Northern Ireland) 1955
No. 57 & 58	
No. 59	The Agricultural Marketing (Temporary Provisions) Order (Northern Ireland) 1955
No. 60	The Pig Industry (Pig Litter Testing Scheme Grant) Order (Northern Ireland) 1955
No. 61	The Ministries (Transfer of Functions) Order (Northern Ireland) 1955
No. 62	The Pigs Marketing Scheme (Northern Ireland) (Amendment) Order (Northern Ireland) 1955
No. 63	The Grammar School (Grant Conditions) Amendment Regulations (Northern Ireland) 1955
No. 64	
No. 65	The Intermediate School (Grant Conditions) Amendment Regulations (Northern Ireland) 1955
No. 66	
No. 67	The Accredited Poultry Farms Scheme (Northern Ireland) 1955
No. 68	The Linen and Cotton Handkerchief and Household Goods and Linen Piece Goods Wages Council (Northern Ireland) Wages Regulations (Amendment) (No. 2) Order (Northern Ireland) 1955
No. 69	The Coal Distribution (Restriction) Order (Northern Ireland) 1955
No. 70	The Foyle Area (Licensing of Fishing Enquiries) (No. 2) Regulations (Northern Ireland) 1955
No. 71	The Summary Jurisdiction: Petty Sessions Districts and Times Order (Northern Ireland) 1955
No. 72	The National Insurance (Maternity Benefit and Miscellaneous Provisions) Amendment Regulations (Northern Ireland) 1955
No. 73	The Supreme Court Rules (Northern Ireland) Order in Council (Northern Ireland) 1955
No. 74	The Technical School Examinations (Amendment) (No. 5) Regulations (Northern Ireland) 1955
No. 75	The Poisons Regulations (Northern Ireland) 1955
No. 76	The Headage Payments (Cattle and Sheep) No. 3 Scheme (Northern Ireland) 1955
No. 77	The National Insurance and Industrial Injuries (Reciprocal Agreement with Luxembourg) Order (Northern Ireland) 1955
No. 78	
No. 79	The Health Services (General Dental Services) (Amendment) Regulations (Northern Ireland) 1955
No. 80	The Tuberculosis (Attested Herds) (Amendment) Scheme (Northern Ireland) 1955
No. 81	
No. 82	The Brush and Broom Wages Council (Northern Ireland) Wages Regulations (Amendment) Order (Northern Ireland) 1955
No. 83	The Importation of Bees Regulations (Northern Ireland) 1955
No. 84	The Foyle Area (Rivers Faughan and Roe Angling) Regulations (Northern Ireland) 1955
No. 85	
No. 86	The General Waste Materials Reclamation Wages Council (Northern Ireland) Wages Regulations (Amendment) Order (Northern Ireland) 1955
No. 87	The Road Vehicles (Armagh, Co Armagh) Regulations (Northern Ireland) 1955
No. 88	The Paper Box Wages Council (Northern Ireland) Wages Regulations (Holidays) Order (Northern Ireland) 1955
No. 89	
No. 90	The Agriculture (Poisonous Substances) Act (Northern Ireland) 1954 (Appointed Day) Order (Northern Ireland) 1955
No. 91	The Civil Defence (Rescue Service) Regulations (Northern Ireland) 1955
No. 92	The Road Vehicles (County Armagh Speed Limit) Regulations (Northern Ireland) 1955
No. 93	The Agriculture (Poisonous Substances) Regulations (Northern Ireland) 1955
No. 94	The Headage Payments (Cattle and Sheep) No. 4 Scheme (Northern Ireland) 1955
No. 95	The Ulster Transport Authority (Terms and Conditions of Employment) (Amendment) Regulations (Northern Ireland) 1955
No. 96	The Ulster Transport Authority (Terms and Conditions of Employment) (No. 2) (Amendment) Regulations (Northern Ireland) 1955
No. 97	The Summary Jurisdiction (Pawnbrokers) Rules (Northern Ireland) 1955
No. 98	The National Insurance (Commencement) (No. 2) (Northern Ireland) 1955
No. 99	The Intoxicating Liquor (Compensation Charges) Order (Northern Ireland) 1955
No. 100	The Ulster Savings Certificates (Sixth Issue - Extension of Currency) Regulations (Northern Ireland) 1955
No. 101	The National Insurance (Contributions) Amendment Regulations (Northern Ireland) 1955
No. 102	
No. 103	The Acreage Payments (Potatoes) Scheme (Northern Ireland) 1955
No. 104	The Superannuation Acts (Transfer Value) Rules (Northern Ireland) 1955
No. 105	The Housing (Grants) Order (Northern Ireland) 1955
No. 106	The Housing Subsidy Order (Northern Ireland) 1955
No. 107	The Prison (Amendment) Rules (Northern Ireland) 1955
No. 108	
No. 109	The Public Health and Local Government (Appointed Day) Order (Northern Ireland) 1955
No. 110	
No. 111	The Public Service Vehicles (Amendment) Regulations (Northern Ireland) 1955
No. 112	
No. 113	The Motor Vehicles (International Circulation) (Registration and Licensing) Order (Northern Ireland) 1955
No. 114	The Motor Vehicles (International Circulation) (Road Traffic) Order (Northern Ireland) 1955
No. 115	The Royal Ulster Constabulary Pensions (Amendment) Order (Northern Ireland) 1955
No. 116	The Summary Jurisdiction: Petty Sessions Districts and Times Order (Northern Ireland) 1955
No. 117	The National Insurance (Residence and Persons Abroad) Amendment Regulations (Northern Ireland) 1955
No. 118	The Headage Payments Scheme 1955-56 (Northern Ireland) 1955
No. 119	The Scorage Payments (Pigs) Scheme 1955-56 (Northern Ireland) 1955
No. 120	The Silage Payments Scheme (Northern Ireland) 1955
No. 121	The Potato Records Eelworm Order (Northern Ireland) 1955
No. 122	The National Insurance and Industrial Injuries (Reciprocal Agreement with the Netherlands) Order (Northern Ireland) 1955
No. 123	
No. 124	The Goods Vehicles (Licensing) Regulations (Northern Ireland) 1955
No. 125	The Summary Jurisdiction: Petty Sessions Districts and Times: Sixmilecross: Order (Northern Ireland) 1955
No. 126	The Linen and Cotton Handkerchief and Household Goods and Linen Piece Goods Wages Council (Northern Ireland) Wages Regulations (Amendment) (No. 3) Order (Northern Ireland) 1955
No. 127	The Transport by Air Order (Northern Ireland) 1955
No. 128	The Road Vehicles (Carrickfergus, County Antrim) Regulations (Northern Ireland) 1955
No. 129	The Road Haulage Wages Council (Northern Ireland) Wages Regulations (Amendment) Order (Northern Ireland) 1955
No. 130 & 131	
No. 132	The Road Vehicles (Registration and Licensing) (Amendment) Regulations (Northern Ireland) 1955
No. 133	The Baking Wages Council (Northern Ireland) Wages Regulations (Holidays) Order (Northern Ireland) 1955
No. 134	
No. 135	The Health Services (Travelling Expenses of Relatives) Regulations (Northern Ireland) 1955
No. 136	
No. 137	The Rope, Twine and Net Wages Council (Northern Ireland) Wages Regulations (Amendment) Order (Northern Ireland) 1955
No. 138	The Game (Hen Pheasant) Order (Northern Ireland) 1955
No. 139	The Marketing of Fruit Rules (Northern Ireland) 1955
No. 140	
No. 141	The Bacon Industry (Pig Husbandry Research Grant) Order (Northern Ireland) 1955
No. 142	The Herbage Seeds (Exemption) Order (Northern Ireland) 1955
No. 143	
No. 144	The Ryegrass Seed (Restriction on Harvesting) Regulations (Northern Ireland) 1955
No. 145	The Rate of Interest (Housing) (No. 4) Order (Northern Ireland) 1955
No. 146	
No. 147	The Acreage Payments (Potatoes) (Amendment) Scheme (Northern Ireland) 1955
No. 148	The Valuation (Appeals) County Court Rules (Northern Ireland) 1955
No. 149	The Compulsory Acquisition of Land (Interest on Compensation Money) (No. 2) Order (Northern Ireland) 1955
No. 150	The Game Preservation (Sale or Purchase of Partridge) Order (Northern Ireland) 1955
No. 151	The Primary Schools (Salaries and Allowances) Amendment Regulations (Northern Ireland) 1955
No. 152	The Intermediate School (Salaries and Allowances of Teachers) Amendment Regulations (Northern Ireland) 1955
No. 153	The Grammar School (Salaries and Allowances of Teachers) Amendment Regulations (Northern Ireland) 1955
No. 154	The Institutions of Further Education (Salaries and Allowances of Teachers) Amendment Regulations (Northern Ireland) 1955
No. 155	The Training College Teachers (Salaries and Allowances) Amendment Regulations (Northern Ireland) 1955
No. 156	The Health Services (Supplementary Eye Services) Regulations (Northern Ireland) 1955
No. 157	The Health Services (Service Committee) (Amendment) Regulations (Northern Ireland) 1955
No. 158	The Transport Act (Abandonment of Railway Line Counties Londonderry and Tyrone) Order (Northern Ireland) 1955
No. 159	The Agricultural Development (Marginal Land Farm Buildings) (Amendment) Scheme (Northern Ireland) 1955
No. 160	The Summary Jurisdiction: Petty Sessions Districts and Times: Coleraine Order (Northern Ireland) 1955
No. 161	The Summary Jurisdiction: Petty Sessions Districts and Times: Claudy Abolition Order (Northern Ireland) 1955
No. 162	The Bacon Industry (Bacon Publicity Grant) Order (Northern Ireland) 1955
No. 163	
No. 164	The National Insurance (Industrial Injuries) (Benefit) Amendment Regulations (Northern Ireland) 1955
No. 165	The Malone Training School (Contributions) Regulations (Northern Ireland) 1955
No. 166	The Milk Marketing Scheme (Northern Ireland) (Amendment) Order (Northern Ireland) 1955
No. 167	The Paper Box Wages Council (Northern Ireland) Wages Regulations (Amendment) Order (Northern Ireland) 1955
No. 168	The Ulster Savings Certificates (Eighth Issue) (Amendment) Regulations (Northern Ireland) 1955
No. 169	The Slaughter-houses (Licensing) Regulations (Northern Ireland) 1955
No. 170	The Headage Payments (Amendment) Scheme 1955-56 (Northern Ireland) 1955
No. 171	The Ulster Special Constabulary Pensions (Amendment) Regulations (Northern Ireland) 1955
No. 172	The Exported Animals (Compensation) Order (Northern Ireland) 1955
No. 173	The Road Vehicles (Traffic Signs) Regulations (Northern Ireland) 1955
No. 174	The Solicitors' Remuneration Order (Northern Ireland) 1955
No. 175	The Factories (Forms and Particulars) Order (Northern Ireland) 1955
No. 176	The Civil Authorities (Special Powers) Act (Amendment) Regulations (Northern Ireland) 1955
No. 177	The Shirtmaking Wages Council (Northern Ireland) Wages Regulations Order (Northern Ireland) 1955
No. 178	The Readymade and Wholesale Bespoke Tailoring Wages Council (Northern Ireland) Wages Regulations (Amendment) Order (Northern Ireland) 1955
No. 179	The Wholesale Mantle and Costume Wages Council (Northern Ireland) Wages Regulations (Amendment) Order (Northern Ireland) 1955
No. 180	The Royal Ulster Constabulary Pay (Amendment) Order (Northern Ireland) 1955
No. 181	The Fire Services (Fire Officers and Firemen) Pensions Order (Northern Ireland) 1955
No. 182	The Fire Services (Part-time Fire Officers and Firemen) Pensions Order (Northern Ireland) 1955
No. 183	The Local Government (Allowances to Members) Regulations (Northern Ireland) 1955
No. 184	The General Revaluation (Prescribed Day) Regulations (Northern Ireland) 1955
No. 185	The Aerated Waters Wages Council (Northern Ireland) Wages Regulations (Amendment) (No. 2) Order (Northern Ireland) 1955
No. 186	The Linen and Cotton Handkerchief and Household Goods and Linen Piece Goods Wages Council (Northern Ireland) Wages Regulations (Holidays) (Amendment) Order (Northern Ireland) 1955
No. 187	The Public Health and Local Government (Appointed Day) (No. 2) Order (Northern Ireland) 1955
No. 188	The Census of Production (Exemption) Order (Northern Ireland) 1955
No. 189	
No. 190	The Housing Subsidy (No. 2) Order (Northern Ireland) 1955
No. 191 &1955 No. 192	Not Allocated
No. 193	Iron and Steel Foundries Regulations (Northern Ireland) 1955
No. 194	The Baking Wages Council (Northern Ireland) Wages Regulations (Northern Ireland) 1955
No. 195	The Baking Wages Council (Northern Ireland) Wages Regulations (No. 2) Order (Northern Ireland) 1955
No. 196	The Baking Wages Council (Northern Ireland) Wages Regulations (No. 4) Order (Northern Ireland) 1955
No. 197	The Sugar Confectionery and Food Preserving Wages Council (Northern Ireland) Wages Regulations Order (Northern Ireland) 1955
No. 198	The Baking Wages Council (Northern Ireland) Wages Regulations (No. 3) Order (Northern Ireland) 1955
No. 199	The Gassing of Vermin Scheme (Northern Ireland) 1955
No. 200	The National Assistance (Determination of Need) Amendment (No. 3) Regulations (Northern Ireland) 1955
No. 201	The Flax (General) Regulations (Northern Ireland) 1955
No. 202	The Fertilisers and Feeding Stuffs Regulations (Northern Ireland) 1955
No. 203	The Agricultural Development (Fertiliser) Scheme (Northern Ireland) 1955

== See also ==
- List of statutory rules of Northern Ireland
