= List of statutory rules and orders of Northern Ireland, 1923 =

This is an incomplete list of statutory rules and orders of Northern Ireland during 1922. Statutory rules and orders were the predecessor of statutory rules and they formed the secondary legislation of Northern Ireland between 1922 and 1973.

Number	Title
No. 1 & 2	
No. 3	The Gas Fund Order (Northern Ireland) 1923
No. 4	
No. 5	The Workmen's Compensation (Dermatitis) Order (Northern Ireland) 1923
No. 6 - 8	
No. 9	The Medical Referees' Remuneration Regulations (Northern Ireland) 1923
No. 10 - 13	
No. 14	The Examination of Bank Accounts Regulations (Northern Ireland) 1923
No. 15	The Road Vehicles (Heavy Motor Car) Order (Northern Ireland) 1923
No. 16	
No. 17	The National Health Insurance (Deposit Contributors) Amendment Regulations (Northern Ireland) 1923
No. 18	The National Health Insurance (Exempt Persons) Regulations (Northern Ireland) 1923
No. 19	The Gas (Carbon Monoxide) Order (Northern Ireland) 1923
No. 20	
No. 21	The Nurses' Qualifications Order (Northern Ireland) 1923
No. 22 - 25	
No. 26	The Live Stock Breeding Rules (Northern Ireland) 1923
No. 27	The National Health Insurance (Approved Societies) Amendment Regulations (Northern Ireland) 1923
No. 28	
No. 29	The Royal Ulster Constabulary Pensions Order (Northern Ireland) 1923
No. 30	
No. 31	The Unemployment Insurance (Computation of Periods) Regulations (Northern Ireland) 1923
No. 32	The Unemployment Insurance (Insurance Industry Special Scheme) (Amendment) Special Order (Northern Ireland) 1923
No. 33	The Unemployment Insurance (Insurance Industry Special Scheme) (Amendment) Order (Northern Ireland) 1923
No. 34	The Unemployment Insurance (Continuous Period of Unemployment) (Transitional) Regulations (Northern Ireland) 1923
No. 35	The Representation of the People (Registration Claim Forms) (Northern Ireland) 1923
No. 36	The Royal Ulster Constabulary Representative Bodies Rules (Northern Ireland) 1923
No. 37	The Company Records Regulations (Northern Ireland) 1923
No. 38	
No. 39	The Parliamentary Elections (Returning Officers' Expenses) Regulations (Northern Ireland) 1923
No. 40	The Electricity Commissioners (Costs and Expenses) Rules (Northern Ireland) 1923
No. 41	The Unemployment Insurance (Courts of Referees) (Amendment) Regulations (Northern Ireland) 1923
No. 42	The Teachers in Preparatory, Intermediate and Secondary Schools, Salaries Regulations (Northern Ireland) 1923
No. 43	
No. 44	The Grants to Preparatory, Intermediate and Secondary Schools 1923 Regulations (Northern Ireland) 1923
No. 45	
No. 46	The Unemployment Insurance (Insurance Industry Special Scheme) (Amendment) Order (No. 2) (Northern Ireland) 1923
No. 47	The Unemployment Insurance (Northern Ireland) (Appropriations in Aid) Regulations (Northern Ireland) 1923
No. 48	The Interned Persons (Amendment) Regulations (Northern Ireland) 1923
No. 49	The Intoxicating Liquor (Finance) Rules (Northern Ireland) 1923
No. 50	
No. 51	The Parliamentary Grants and Rate Aid Regulations (Northern Ireland) 1923
No. 52	The Teachers' Pension Rules (Northern Ireland) 1923
No. 53	The Retired Teachers Pensions (Increase) Regulations (Northern Ireland) 1923
No. 54	The Teachers in Preparatory, Intermediate and Secondary Schools, Certification Regulations (Northern Ireland) 1923
No. 55	
No. 56	The Unemployment Insurance (Insurance Industry Special Scheme) (Grant) Regulations (Northern Ireland) 1923
No. 57	
No. 58	The Interned Persons (Amendment) Regulations (Northern Ireland) 1923
No. 59 & 60	
No. 61	The Unemployment Insurance (Insurance Industry Special Scheme) (Amendment) Order (No. 3) (Northern Ireland) 1923
No. 62	The Unemployment Insurance (Insurance Industry Special Scheme) (Amendment) Special Order (No. 2) (Northern Ireland) 1923
No. 63	The Unemployment Insurance (Repayment and Return of Contributions) (Amendment) Regulations (Northern Ireland) 1923
No. 64	The Allegiance (Local Authorities) Order (Northern Ireland) 1923
No. 65	The Allegiance (Educational Committees) Order (Northern Ireland) 1923
No. 66	The Colorado Beetle Order (Northern Ireland) 1923
No. 67	The Black Scab in Potatoes No. 1 Order (Northern Ireland) 1923
No. 68	The Black Scab in Potatoes No. 2 Order (Northern Ireland) 1923
No. 69	The Housing (Assisted Scheme) Regulations (Northern Ireland) 1923
No. 70	The Prisons Order (Northern Ireland) 1923
No. 71	The Public Records Regulations (Northern Ireland) 1923
No. 72	The Peace Preservation, Curfew Order (Northern Ireland) 1923
No. 73	The Petty Sessions Fees Order (Northern Ireland) 1923
No. 74	The Weights and Measures (Verification and Inspection) Order (Northern Ireland) 1923
No. 75 - 97	
No. 98	The Resident Magistrates - Salaries and Allowances (Northern Ireland) 1923
No. 99	The Road Fund Regulations (Northern Ireland) 1923

== See also ==
- List of statutory rules of Northern Ireland
