= List of statutory rules and orders of Northern Ireland, 1951 =

This is an incomplete list of statutory rules and orders of Northern Ireland during 1951. Statutory rules and orders were the predecessor of statutory rules and they formed the secondary legislation of Northern Ireland between 1922 and 1973.

Number	Title
No. 1 & 2	
No. 3	The Artificial Insemination (Cattle) (Amendment) Regulations (Northern Ireland) 1951
No. 4	The Health Services (Availability of Services) (Amendment) Regulations (Northern Ireland) 1951
No. 5	The Petty Sessions, Districts and Times Order (Northern Ireland) 1951
No. 6	
No. 7	The Superannuation (Allocation of Pension) Rules (Northern Ireland) 1951
No. 8	
No. 9	The Bee Pest Prevention (Amendment) Regulations (Northern Ireland) 1951
No. 10	The Interchange of Teachers Regulations (Northern Ireland) 1951
No. 11	The Housing on Farms (Grants) Order (Northern Ireland) 1951
No. 12	The Motor Cars (Use and Construction) (Amendment) Regulations (Northern Ireland) 1951
No. 13	The Ulster Savings Certificates (Eighth Issue) Regulations (Northern Ireland) 1951
No. 14	The Aerated Waters Wages Council (Northern Ireland) Wages Regulations Order (Northern Ireland) 1951
No. 15	The Superannuation (Prison Officers) Order (Northern Ireland) 1951
No. 16	
No. 17	The Boot and Shoe Repairing Wages Council (Northern Ireland) Wages Regulations (Holidays) Order (Northern Ireland) 1951
No. 18	The Voluntary Grammar Schools Meals Grant Amendment Regulations No. 2 (Northern Ireland) 1951
No. 19	The Parliamentary Grants (Local Education Authorities) Amendment Regulations No. 3 (Northern Ireland) 1951
No. 20	The Milk and Meals Amendment Regulations No. 2 (Northern Ireland) 1951
No. 21	The National Insurance (Industrial Injuries) (Prescribed Diseases) Amendment Regulations (Northern Ireland) 1951
No. 22	
No. 23	The Grass Seeds and Fertilisers (Revocation) Order (Northern Ireland) 1951
No. 24 - 26	
No. 27	The Agricultural Goods and Services (Marginal Production) Regulations (Northern Ireland) 1951
No. 28	The Order confirming the Erne Development Scheme (Northern Ireland) 1951
No. 29	The Order confirming the Erne Summer Relief Drainage Scheme (Northern Ireland) 1951
No. 30	The Road Vehicles (Part-Year Licensing) Order (Northern Ireland) 1951
No. 31	The National Insurance (Industrial Injuries) (Prescribed Diseases) Amendment (No. 2) Regulations (Northern Ireland) 1951
No. 32	The Health Services (Medical Practices Compensation) (Amendment) Regulations (Northern Ireland) 1951
No. 33	The Petty Sessions Districts and Times (Bangor) Order (Northern Ireland) 1951
No. 34	The Pharmacy and Poisons - Order in Council amendment the Third Sch of the Pharmacy and Poisons Act (Northern Ireland) 1951
No. 35	The Government Loans - Creation of One Million Pounds of Northern Ireland Loans Stock (Northern Ireland) 1951
No. 36	The Government Loans - Northern Ireland Loans Stock - Rate per cent of Dividends and Date of Redemption (Northern Ireland) 1951
No. 37	The Grammar School (Grant Conditions) Amendment Regulations (Northern Ireland) 1951
No. 38	The National Insurance (Contributions) Amendment Regulations (Northern Ireland) 1951
No. 39	The National Insurance (Residence and Persons Abroad) Amendment Regulations (Northern Ireland) 1951
No. 40	The Training Schools (Contributions by Local Authorities) Regulations (Northern Ireland) 1951
No. 41	The Poisons Regulations (Northern Ireland) 1951
No. 42	The Mental Health (Charge for Mid-day Meal at Instruction and Occupation Centres) Regulations (Northern Ireland) 1951
No. 43	The Health Services (Travelling Expenses of Patients) (Hospital and Specialist Services) Regulations (Northern Ireland) 1951
No. 44	The Superannuation (Public Offices) Rules (Northern Ireland) 1951
No. 45 & 46	
No. 47	The Health Services (General Dental Services) (Amendment) Regulations (Northern Ireland) 1951
No. 48	The Advertisement Lighting (Prohibition) (Revocation) Order (Northern Ireland) 1951
No. 49	The Health Services (General Scheme) (Modification) Order (Northern Ireland) 1951
No. 50	The Land Registry (Statutory Charges Register) Rules (Northern Ireland) 1951
No. 51	The Foundries (Parting Materials) Special Regulations (Northern Ireland) 1951
No. 52	The Road Vehicles (Warrenpoint, County Down) Regulations (Northern Ireland) 1951
No. 53	The Goods Vehicles Regulations (Northern Ireland) 1951
No. 54	The Public Service Vehicles Regulations (Northern Ireland) 1951
No. 55	The Employment of Teachers (Superannuation Contributions Grants) Regulations (Northern Ireland) 1951
No. 56	The Parliamentary Grants (Local Education Authorities) Amendment Regulations No. 4 (Northern Ireland) 1951
No. 57	The Compulsory School Age (Postponement) Order (Northern Ireland) 1951
No. 58	
No. 59	The Milk Act (Northern Ireland) 1950 (Commencement) Order (Northern Ireland) 1951
No. 60	The Milk Licences (Temporary Provisions) Regulations (Northern Ireland) 1951
No. 61	The National Insurance (Industrial Injuries) (Mariners) Amendment Regulations (Northern Ireland) 1951
No. 62	The Health Services (General Medical and Pharmaceutical Services) (Amendment) Regulations (Northern Ireland) 1951
No. 63	The Fire Services (Standard Fire Provision) Regulations (Northern Ireland) 1951
No. 64	
No. 65	The Dangerous Drugs Regulations (Northern Ireland) 1951
No. 66	The Local Government Superannuation (Allocation of Pension) Rules (Northern Ireland) 1951
No. 67	The Laundry Wages Council (Northern Ireland) Wages Regulations (Holidays) (Amendment) Order (Northern Ireland) 1951
No. 68	
No. 69	The Superannuation (Joint Service) (Amendment) Regulations (Northern Ireland) 1951
No. 70	The Agricultural Goods and Services (Marginal Production Feeding Stuffs Assistance) Amendment Regulations (Northern Ireland) 1951
No. 71 & 72	
No. 73	The Parliamentary Grants (Local Education Authorities) Amendment Regulations No. 5 (Northern Ireland) 1951
No. 74	The Grammar School (Salaries and Allowances of Teachers) Regulations (Northern Ireland) 1951
No. 75	The Intermediate School (Salaries and Allowances of Teachers) Regulations (Northern Ireland) 1951
No. 76	The Primary Schools (Salaries and Allowances) Regulations (Northern Ireland) 1951
No. 77	The Institutions of Further Education (Salaries and Allowances of Teachers) Regulations (Northern Ireland) 1951
No. 78	The Belfast County Borough Council (City Surveyor's Staff Qualifications) (Amendment) Order (Northern Ireland) 1951
No. 79	The Health Services (Charges for Appliances) (Hospitals) Regulations (Northern Ireland) 1951
No. 80	The Health Services (Supplementary Eye Services) Regulations (Northern Ireland) 1951
No. 81	The Health Services (General Dental Services) (Amendment) (No. 2) Regulations (Northern Ireland) 1951
No. 82	The Handicapped Pupils and Special Schools (Amendment) Regulations (Northern Ireland) 1951
No. 83	The Nursery Schools (Amendment) Regulations (Northern Ireland) 1951
No. 84	The Baking Wages Council (Northern Ireland) Wages Regulations (No. 3) Order (Northern Ireland) 1951
No. 85	The Readymade and Wholesale Bespoke Tailoring Wages Council (Northern Ireland) Wages Regulations Order (Northern Ireland) 1951
No. 86	The Scutch Mills and Flax (Fire Insurance) (Amendment) Regulations (Northern Ireland) 1951
No. 87	The Stormont Estate (Amendment) Regulations (Northern Ireland) 1951
No. 88	The Boards of Conservators (Trout Rod Representation) Order (Northern Ireland) 1951
No. 89	The Grammar Schools (Admissions, Scholarships and Special Allowances) (Amendment) Regulations (Northern Ireland) 1951
No. 90	The Handicapped Pupils and Special Schools (Amendment) (No. 2) Regulations (Northern Ireland) 1951
No. 91	The Shirtmaking Wages Council (Northern Ireland) Wages Regulations Order (Northern Ireland) 1951
No. 92	
No. 93	The Audit: Examination of Accounts: Erne Development Account (Northern Ireland) 1951
No. 94	
No. 95	The Intoxicating Liquor (Compensation Charges) Order (Northern Ireland) 1951
No. 96	The Marketing of Eggs (Amendment) Rules (Northern Ireland) 1951
No. 97 & 98	
No. 99	The Seeds (Amendment) Regulations (Northern Ireland) 1951
No. 100	The Health Services (Promissory Oaths) (Amendment) Regulations (Northern Ireland) 1951
No. 101	The National Insurance (Industrial Injuries) (Claims and Payments) Amendment Regulations (Northern Ireland) 1951
No. 102	The National Insurance (Industrial Injuries) (Benefit) Amendment Regulations (Northern Ireland) 1951
No. 103	The Health Services (Appointed Day) Order (Northern Ireland) 1951
No. 104	The Public Health and Local Government (Revenue Accounts of Boards of Guardians) Regulations (Northern Ireland) 1951
No. 105	The Land Law: Authentication of Seal of Ministry of Commerce (Northern Ireland) 1951
No. 106	The Teachers Superannuation Rules (Northern Ireland) 1951
No. 107	The National Insurance (Industrial Injuries) (Contributions during service in the Forces) Regulations (Northern Ireland) 1951
No. 108	The Dressmaking and Women's Light Clothing Wages Council (Northern Ireland) Wages Regulations Order (Northern Ireland) 1951
No. 109	The Utility Furniture (Marking and Supply) (Amendment) (Northern Ireland) Order (Northern Ireland) 1951
No. 110	The National Insurance (Pensions, Existing Contributors) (Transitional) Amendment Regulations (Northern Ireland) 1951
No. 111	The Housing on Farms Regulations (Northern Ireland) 1951
No. 112	The Control of Building Operations Order (Northern Ireland) 1951
No. 113	The Health Services (General Medical and Pharmaceutical Services) (Amendment) (No. 2) Regulations (Northern Ireland) 1951
No. 114	
No. 115	The Housing Subsidy Order (Northern Ireland) 1951
No. 116	The Housing (Grants) Order (Northern Ireland) 1951
No. 117	The National Insurance (Classification) Amendment Regulations (Northern Ireland) 1951
No. 118	The Potatoes (Frequency of Planting) Order (Northern Ireland) 1951
No. 119	The Fertilisers and Feeding Stuffs (Northern Ireland) (Amendment) Regulations (Northern Ireland) 1951
No. 120	The Dressmaking and Women's Lighting Clothing Wages Council (Northern Ireland) Wages Regulations Order (Northern Ireland) 1951
No. 121	
No. 122	The Newtownards Sewage Disposal Joint Board Order (Northern Ireland) 1951
No. 123	The Ulster Special Constabulary Pensions (Amendment) Regulations (Northern Ireland) 1951
No. 124	The Teachers Superannuation (Allocation) Rules (Northern Ireland) 1951
No. 125	The Factories (Miscellaneous Welfare Orders, etc., Amendment) Order (Northern Ireland) 1951
No. 126	The Maintenance Orders Act 1950 (Summary Jurisdiction) Rules (Northern Ireland) 1951
No. 127	The Royal Ulster Constabulary Pay (Amendment) Order (Northern Ireland) 1951
No. 128	
No. 129	The National Insurance (Modification of Teachers Annual Allowances) Regulations (Northern Ireland) 1951
No. 130	The Utility Furniture (Marking and Supply) (Amendment No. 2) Order (Northern Ireland) 1951
No. 131	The Health Services (Superannuation) (Amendment) (No. 1) Regulations (Northern Ireland) 1951
No. 132	The Ulster Transport Authority (Terms and Conditions of Employment) (No. 2) Regulations (Northern Ireland) 1951
No. 133	The Health Services (General Dental Services) (Amendment) (No. 3) Regulations (Northern Ireland) 1951
No. 134	The Training College Teachers (Salaries and Allowances) Regulations (Northern Ireland) 1951
No. 135	The Voluntary Grammar Schools Meals Grant Amendment Regulations No. 3 (Northern Ireland) 1951
No. 136	The Workmen's Compensation (Supplementation) Regulations (Northern Ireland) 1951
No. 137	The National Assistance (Determination of Need) Amendment Regulations (Northern Ireland) 1951
No. 138	The Wild Birds: Sale for Consumption Order (Northern Ireland) 1951
No. 139	The Wild Birds: Geese (Barnacle and Brent) Order (Northern Ireland) 1951
No. 140	The Wild Birds: Geese Order (Northern Ireland) 1951
No. 141	The Wild Birds: Time of Special Protection Order (Northern Ireland) 1951
No. 142	The Training Colleges (Admission of Students in 1952) Regulations (Northern Ireland) 1951
No. 143	The Grammar School (Grant Conditions) Amendment Regulations No. 2 (Northern Ireland) 1951
No. 144	The Registrars' Districts of Lisburn and Downpatrick - Alteration of Boundaries (Northern Ireland) 1951
No. 145	
No. 146	The Royal Ulster Constabulary Representative Body Rules (Northern Ireland) 1951
No. 147 - 149	
No. 150	The National Insurance (Claims and Payments) Amendment Regulations (Northern Ireland) 1951
No. 151	The Marketing of Eggs (Amendment No. 2) Rules (Northern Ireland) 1951
No. 152	The Londonderry Port and Harbour (Temporary Increase of Charges) (Revocation) Order (Northern Ireland) 1951
No. 153	The Transport Tribunal for Northern Ireland (Appointed Day) Order (Northern Ireland) 1951
No. 154	The National Insurance (Increase of Benefit, Re-entry into Regular Employment and Miscellaneous Provisions) Regulations (Northern Ireland) 1951
No. 155	The National Insurance (Commencement) Order (Northern Ireland) 1951
No. 156	The Welfare Authorities (Charges for Residential Accommodation) (Amendment) Regulations (Northern Ireland) 1951
No. 157	The National Insurance (Determination of Claims and Questions) Amendment Regulations (Northern Ireland) 1951
No. 158	The Coal Supply Order (Northern Ireland) 1951
No. 159	The Marketing of Ryegrass Seed Regulations (Northern Ireland) 1951
No. 160	The Public Bodies (Accounts of County Health Committees) Order (Northern Ireland) 1951
No. 161	The National Insurance (Industrial Injuries) (Benefit) Amendment (No. 2) Regulations (Northern Ireland) 1951
No. 162	The Ministries (Transfer of Functions) (Teachers Superannuation) Order (Northern Ireland) 1951
No. 163	The Dangerous Drugs Act (Application) Order (Northern Ireland) 1951
No. 164	The Road Vehicles (Registration and Licensing) (Amendment) Regulations (Northern Ireland) 1951
No. 165 - 167	
No. 168	The Marketing of Fruit Rules (Northern Ireland) 1951
No. 169	The Employment of Teachers (Grants in Respect of National Insurance Contributions) Regulations (Northern Ireland) 1951
No. 170	The Audit: Examination of Accounts: Land Purchase (Sale of Holdings) Account (Northern Ireland) 1951
No. 171	The Audit: Examination of Accounts: Erne Development Account: Minute (Northern Ireland) 1951
No. 172	
No. 173	The Electoral (Register of Electors) (Amendment) Regulations (Northern Ireland) 1951
No. 174	The National Insurance (Mariners) Amendment Regulations (Northern Ireland) 1951
No. 175	The Paper Box Wages Council Wages Regulations Amendment (No. 2) Order (Northern Ireland) 1951
No. 176	
No. 177	The Wholesale Mantle and Costume Wages Council (Northern Ireland) Wages Regulations Order (Northern Ireland) 1951
No. 178	The Health Services (Supplementary Eye Services) Qualifications) Regulations (Northern Ireland) 1951
No. 179	The Building Operations (First-Aid and Ambulance Room Equipment) Order (Northern Ireland) 1951
No. 180	The Electoral (Registration Expenses) Regulations (Northern Ireland) 1951
No. 181	The National Insurance (Overlapping Benefits) Amendment Regulations (Northern Ireland) 1951
No. 182	The National Insurance (Industrial Injuries) (Benefit) Amendment (No. 3) Regulations (Northern Ireland) 1951
No. 183	The Family Allowances (Guernsey Reciprocal Arrangements) Regulations (Northern Ireland) 1951
No. 184	The Rope, Twine and Net Wages Council (Northern Ireland) Wages Regulations Order (Northern Ireland) 1951
No. 185	
No. 186	The Flax (General) (Amendment) Regulations (Northern Ireland) 1951
No. 187	The Civil Authorities (Special Powers) Acts Regulations (Northern Ireland) 1951
No. 188	The Linen and Cotton Handkerchief and Household Goods and Linen Piece Goods Wages Council (Northern Ireland) Wages Regulations Order (Northern Ireland) 1951
No. 189	The Milk Regulations (Northern Ireland) 1951
No. 190	The Coal Supply (Northern Ireland) (Amendment) (No. 1) Order (Northern Ireland) 1951
No. 191	The Coal Distrubution [sic] (Restriction) (Northern Ireland) Order (Northern Ireland) 1951
No. 192	The General Waste Materials Reclamation Wages Council (Northern Ireland) Wages Regulations Order (Northern Ireland) 1951
No. 193	The Ulster Savings Certificates: Second Issue (Northern Ireland) 1951
No. 194	
No. 195	The Dangerous Drugs (No. 2) Regulations (Northern Ireland) 1951
No. 196	The Health Services (Return of Hospital Endowments) Regulations (Northern Ireland) 1951
No. 197	The Government Loans - Order creating Two Million Pounds of Northern Ireland Loans Stock (Northern Ireland) 1951
No. 198	The Government Loans - Northern Ireland Loans Stock (Rate of Dividend and Redemption) (No. 2) Regulations (Northern Ireland) 1951
No. 199	The Voluntary Grammar Schools Building etc. Grant Regulations (Northern Ireland) 1951
No. 200 & 201	
No. 202	The Rate of Interest (Housing) Order (Northern Ireland) 1951
No. 203	The Transport Act (Abandonment of Railway) (No. 1) Order (Northern Ireland) 1951
No. 204	The Public Service Vehicles (Construction) (Amendment) Regulations (Northern Ireland) 1951
No. 205	
No. 206	The Utility Furniture (Marking and Supply) (Amendment No. 3) Order (Northern Ireland) 1951
No. 207	The Malone Training School (Contributions) Regulations (Northern Ireland) 1951
No. 208	
No. 209	The Laundry Wages Council (Northern Ireland) Wages Regulations Order (Northern Ireland) 1951
No. 210	The Training Colleges (Admission of Students in 1952) (Amendment) Regulations (Northern Ireland) 1951
No. 211	The Health Services (Supplementary Eye Services) (Amendment) Regulations (Northern Ireland) 1951
No. 212	The Sugar Confectionery and Food Preserving Wages Council (Northern Ireland) Wages Regulations (No. 2) Order (Northern Ireland) 1951
No. 213	The Road Vehicles (Enniskillen County Fermanagh) Regulations (Northern Ireland) 1951
No. 214	The Local Government (Designated Bodies) (Superannuation) Regulations (Northern Ireland) 1951
No. 215	The Linen and Cotton Handkerchief and Household Goods and Linen Piece Goods Wages Council (Northern Ireland) Wages Regulations (Holidays) Order (Northern Ireland) 1951
No. 216	The Brush and Broom Wages Council (Northern Ireland) Wages Regulations (Amendment) (No. 2) Order (Northern Ireland) 1951
No. 217	The Boot and Shoe Repairing Wages Council (Northern Ireland) Wages Regulations Order (Northern Ireland) 1951
No. 218	The Trunk Roads (Designation of Routes) (Amendment) (Northern Ireland) Order (Northern Ireland) 1951
No. 219	The Ulster Transport Authority (Terms and Conditions of Employment) (No. 3) Regulations (Northern Ireland) 1951
No. 220	The Bacon Industry (Pig Husbandry Research Grant) Order (Northern Ireland) 1951
No. 221	The Road Vehicles (City of Armagh, County Armagh) Regulations (Northern Ireland) 1951
No. 222	The Census of Production (Exemption) Order (Northern Ireland) 1951
No. 223	The Royal Ulster Constabulary Reward Fund Regulations (Northern Ireland) 1951
No. 224	The Baking Wages Council (Northern Ireland) Wages Regulations (No. 4) Order (Northern Ireland) 1951
No. 225	The Baking Wages Council (Northern Ireland) Wages Regulations (No. 5) Order (Northern Ireland) 1951
No. 226	The South Armagh Regional Waterworks Joint Board Order (Northern Ireland) 1951
No. 227	The Local Government (Finance) (Boards of Guardians) Regulations (Northern Ireland) 1951
No. 228	The Housing on Farms (Grants) (No. 2) Order (Northern Ireland) 1951

== See also ==
- List of statutory rules of Northern Ireland
