= List of statutory rules and orders of Northern Ireland, 1969 =

This is an incomplete list of statutory rules and orders of Northern Ireland during 1962. Statutory rules and orders were the predecessor of statutory rules and they formed the secondary legislation of Northern Ireland between 1922 and 1973.

Number	Title
No. 27	Office and Shop Premises (Hoists and Lifts) Reports Order (Northern Ireland) 1969

== See also ==
- List of statutory rules of Northern Ireland
