= List of statutory rules and orders of Northern Ireland, 1938 =

This is an incomplete list of statutory rules and orders of Northern Ireland during 1922. Statutory rules and orders were the predecessor of statutory rules and they formed the secondary legislation of Northern Ireland between 1922 and 1973.

Number	Title
No. 1	
No. 2	The Gas Order: Rate of Payment to Ministry of Commerce (Northern Ireland) 1937
No. 3	The Road and Railway Transport (Pooling Scheme) Order (Northern Ireland) 1937
No. 4 & 5	
No. 6	The Rates of Interest (Housing) Order (Northern Ireland) 1937
No. 7	The Movement of Swine (Belfast) Order (Northern Ireland) 1937
No. 8	The Superannuation (Joint Service) Regulations (Northern Ireland) 1937
No. 9	
No. 10	The Rural Districts Invested with Urban Powers Order (Northern Ireland) 1937
No. 11	The Wild Birds Protection Order (Northern Ireland) 1937
No. 12	The Unemployment Insurance (Private Gardeners Inclusion) Order (Northern Ireland) 1937
No. 13	
No. 14	The Importation of Dogs and Cats Order (Northern Ireland) 1937
No. 15	The Sheep Dipping Amendment Order (Northern Ireland) 1937
No. 16	The Sea-Fishing Industry (Immature Sea-Fish) Order (Northern Ireland) 1937
No. 17	The Public Elementary Schools Amending No. 4 Regulations (Northern Ireland) 1937
No. 18	
No. 19	The Pigs Marketing (Grading) (Amendment) Order (Northern Ireland) 1937
No. 20	The Importation of Plants (Amendment) Order (Northern Ireland) 1937
No. 21	The District Hospitals (Amendment) Order (Northern Ireland) 1937
No. 22	The Road Traffic (Pedestrian Crossings) Regulations (Northern Ireland) 1937
No. 23	The Technical Attendance Grants Amending No. 2 Regulations (Northern Ireland) 1937
No. 24 & 25	
No. 26	The Unemployment Insurance (Benefit Miscellaneous Provisions) (Amendment) Regulations (Northern Ireland) 1937
No. 27	The Unemployment Insurance (Additional Days and Waiting Period) Order (Northern Ireland) 1937
No. 28	The Butter and Cream Marketing Scheme Amendment (No. 1) Order (Northern Ireland) 1937
No. 29	The Technical Teachers Amending No. 5 Regulations (Northern Ireland) 1937
No. 30	The Nursery Schools Regulations (Northern Ireland) 1937
No. 31	The Summary Jurisdiction (Petty Sessions Districts) Order (Northern Ireland) 1937
No. 32	The Agricultural Produce (Meat Regulation) Rules (Northern Ireland) 1937
No. 33	
No. 34	The Unemployment Insurance (Insurance Industry Special Scheme) (Variation and Amendment) Order (Northern Ireland) 1937
No. 35 & 36	
No. 37	The Secondary Teachers Regulations (Northern Ireland) 1937
No. 38	The Evening Elementary Schools Interim Amending No. 1 Regulations (Northern Ireland) 1937
No. 39	The Unemployment Insurance (Mixed Employment) Regulations (Northern Ireland) 1937
No. 40	The Marketing of Dairy Produce (Marketing of Cream) Rules (Northern Ireland) 1937
No. 41	The Local Carriers Regulations (Northern Ireland) 1937
No. 42	The Unemployment Insurance (Special Arrangements) Regulations (Northern Ireland) 1937
No. 43	The Unemployment Insurance (Courts of Referees) Regulations (Northern Ireland) 1937
No. 44	
No. 45	The Measuring Instruments (Liquid Fuel and Lubricating Oil) Amendment Regulations (Northern Ireland) 1937
No. 46	The Pig Industry Council (Term and Conditions of Office of Members) Rules (Northern Ireland) 1937
No. 47	
No. 48	The Marketing of Eggs (Amendment) Rules (Northern Ireland) 1937
No. 49	The Contributory Pensions (Isle of Man Reciprocal Arrangements) Regulations (Northern Ireland) 1937
No. 50	The Unemployment Insurance (Payment of Travelling Expenses) Regulations (Northern Ireland) 1937
No. 51	The Road and Railway Transport: Acquisition of Undertakings: Extension of Period Order (Northern Ireland) 1937
No. 52	The Sheep Dipping (Special Regulation) Order (Northern Ireland) 1937
No. 53	The Public Health (Imported Food) Regulations (Northern Ireland) 1937
No. 54	The Ancient Monuments: Advisory Council Order (Northern Ireland) 1937
No. 55	
No. 56	The Horse Breeding (Amendment) Rules (Northern Ireland) 1937
No. 57	The Public Elementary Schools Amending No. 5 Regulations (Northern Ireland) 1937
No. 58	The Pigs Marketing (Special Levy) (No. 1) Order (Northern Ireland) 1937
No. 59	The Unemployment Insurance (Benefit) Regulations (Northern Ireland) 1937
No. 60	The Road and Railway Transport (Pooling Scheme) Order (Northern Ireland) 1937
No. 61	The Motor Vehicles and Road Traffic Act County Court Rules (Northern Ireland) 1937
No. 62	The Pigs Marketing (Grading) (Amendment No. 2) Order (Northern Ireland) 1937
No. 63	The Ancient Monuments: Archaeological Finds Regulations (Northern Ireland) 1937
No. 64	The New Industries (Development) Regulations (Northern Ireland) 1937
No. 65	The Marketing of Pigs (Form of Curers' Returns) (Amendment) Regulations (Northern Ireland) 1937
No. 66	The Intoxicating Liquor: Licences: Rates of Charges Order (Northern Ireland) 1937
No. 67 & 68	
No. 69	The Malone Training School: Contributions by County Councils Regulations (Northern Ireland) 1937
No. 70	The Local Government (Postponement of Elections) Order (Northern Ireland) 1937
No. 71	The Local Government (Elections) Order (Northern Ireland) 1937
No. 72	The Unemployment Insurance (Mercantile Marine Exclusion) Regulations (Northern Ireland) 1937
No. 73	The National Health and Unemployment Insurance (Inspectors' Certificates) Regulations (Northern Ireland) 1937
No. 74	The Agricultural Teachers (Amending) Regulations (Northern Ireland) 1937
No. 75	
No. 76	The Marketing of Eggs (Purchase by Contract) Rules (Northern Ireland) 1937
No. 77	The Marketing of Eggs (Amendment) (No. 2) Rules (Northern Ireland) 1937
No. 78	The Milk (Grade A) (Amendment) Regulations (Northern Ireland) 1937
No. 79	The Milk (Grade B) (Amendment) Regulations (Northern Ireland) 1937
No. 80	The Milk (Grade C) (Amendment) Regulations (Northern Ireland) 1937
No. 81	
No. 82	The Local Government (Procedure of Councils) Order (Northern Ireland) 1937
No. 83	The Marketing of Fruit Rules (Northern Ireland) 1937
No. 84	The Residuary Share Suspense Account Regulations (Northern Ireland) 1937
No. 85	The Unemployment Insurance (Inconsiderable Employments) Regulations (Northern Ireland) 1937
No. 86	The Parliamentary Grant (Education Authorities) Regulations (Northern Ireland) 1937
No. 87	The Public Elementary Schools Amending No. 6 Regulations (Northern Ireland) 1937
No. 88	The Joint Milk Council (Election of Members by Distributors) Regulations (Northern Ireland) 1937
No. 89	The Secondary School Teachers Regulations (Northern Ireland) 1937
No. 90 - 92	
No. 93	The Contributory Pensions (Joint Committee) Regulations (Northern Ireland) 1937
No. 94	The Contributory Pensions (Payments on Death) Regulations (Northern Ireland) 1937
No. 95	The Pigs Marketing (Special Levy) (No. 2) Order (Northern Ireland) 1937
No. 96	The Poor Law: General Regulations (Northern Ireland) 1937
No. 97	The Dangerous Drugs Order in Council (Northern Ireland) 1937
No. 98	
No. 99	The Petty Sessions: Districts and Times Order (Northern Ireland) 1937
No. 100	The Contributory Pensions (Approved Societies Returns) Regulations (Northern Ireland) 1937
No. 101	The Technical School Teachers Regulations (Northern Ireland) 1937
No. 102	The Slaughtered Animals (Compensation) Act (Northern Ireland) 1928 (Suspension of Charges) Order (Northern Ireland) 1937
No. 103	The Pigs Marketing (Special Levy) (No. 3) Order (Northern Ireland) 1937
No. 104	The Marketing of Potatoes Rules (Northern Ireland) 1937
No. 105	The Railways (Valuation for Rating) Rules (Northern Ireland) 1937
No. 106	The Contributory Pensions (Notification of Incapacity) Regulations (Northern Ireland) 1937
No. 107	The Contributory Pensions (Employment under Local and Public Authorities) Order (Northern Ireland) 1937
No. 108	The National Health Insurance (Employment under Local and Public Authorities) Order (Northern Ireland) 1937
No. 109	The National Health Insurance (Outworkers) Order (Northern Ireland) 1937
No. 110	The Marketing of Eggs (Determination of Wholesale Dealers' Prices) Order (Northern Ireland) 1937
No. 111 - 116	
No. 117	The Teachers' (Secondary and Preparatory) Superannuation (Amendment) Scheme (Northern Ireland) 1937
No. 118	The Contributory Pensions (Exempt and Excepted Persons) Regulations (Northern Ireland) 1937
No. 119	The Contributory Pensions (Joint Committee) Regulations (Northern Ireland) 1937
No. 120	The Milk (Equalisation Payments) Regulations (Northern Ireland) 1937
No. 121	The Unemployment Insurance (Employment under Local and Public Authorities) Regulations (Northern Ireland) 1937
No. 122	The Contributory Pensions (Special Voluntary Contributors) Regulations (Northern Ireland) 1937
No. 123	The Pigs Marketing (Special Levy) (No. 3) Amendment Order (Northern Ireland) 1937
No. 124	The County Courts: Judges Order (Northern Ireland) 1937
No. 125	The Milk (Grade C) Regulations (Northern Ireland) 1937
No. 126	The Contributory Pensions (Death Certificates) Regulations (Northern Ireland) 1937
No. 127	The Contributory Pensions (Full Time Instruction) Regulations (Northern Ireland) 1937
No. 128	The Marketing of Eggs (Retailers' Prices) Rules (Northern Ireland) 1937
No. 129	The Marketing of Eggs (Retailers' Prices) (No. 2) Rules (Northern Ireland) 1937
No. 130	The Road Vehicles (Part Year Licensing) Order (Northern Ireland) 1937
No. 131	The Milk (Equalisation Payments) Regulations (Northern Ireland) 1937
No. 132	The Summary Jurisdiction (Petty Sessions Districts) (No. 2) Order (Northern Ireland) 1937
No. 133	The Public Health (Imported Food) Regulations (Northern Ireland) 1937
No. 134	The Public Service Vehicles and Goods Vehicles (Drivers' Hours of Duty) (Amendment) Regulations (Northern Ireland) 1937
No. 135	The Contributory Pensions (Patients of Unsound Mind) Regulations (Northern Ireland) 1937
No. 136	The Contributory Pensions (Determination of Income) Regulations (Northern Ireland) 1937
No. 137	The Contributory Pensions (Calculation of Contributions) Regulations (Northern Ireland) 1937
No. 138 & 139	
No. 140	The Contributory Pensions (Procedure on References) Regulations (Northern Ireland) 1937
No. 141	The Summary Jurisdiction (Petty Sessions Districts) (No. 3) Order (Northern Ireland) 1937
No. 142	The Petty Sessions: Districts and Times Order (Northern Ireland) 1937
No. 143	
No. 144	The Non-Contributory Old Age Pensions Regulations (Northern Ireland) 1937
No. 145	The National Health Insurance (Sickness Visitation) Regulations (Northern Ireland) 1937
No. 146	
No. 147	The Road and Railway Transport: Acquisition of Undertakings Order (Northern Ireland) 1937
No. 148	The Unemployment Insurance (Contributions) Regulations (Northern Ireland) 1937
No. 149	The Unemployment Insurance (Special Arrangements) (Amendment) Regulations (Northern Ireland) 1937
No. 150 - 155	
No. 156	The Civil Authorities (Special Powers) Refusal to Recognise Court Order (Northern Ireland) 1937
No. 157	The Butter and Margarine (Sales) Regulations (Northern Ireland) 1937

== See also ==
- List of statutory rules of Northern Ireland
