= List of statutory rules and orders of Northern Ireland, 1952 =

This is an incomplete list of statutory rules and orders of Northern Ireland during 1952. Statutory rules and orders were the predecessor of statutory rules and they formed the secondary legislation of Northern Ireland between 1922 and 1973.

Number	Title
No. 1 & 2	
No. 3	The Housing (Owner Occupation) Regulations (Northern Ireland) 1952
No. 4	The Housing (Houses Built for Letting) Regulations (Northern Ireland) 1952
No. 5	
No. 6	The Aerated Waters Wages Council (Northern Ireland) Wages Regulations Order (Northern Ireland) 1952
No. 7	
No. 8	The Live Stock Breeding (Licensing of Bulls) (Amendment) Rules (Northern Ireland) 1952
No. 9	The Order in Council Amendment the Third Schedule to the Medicines, Pharmacy and Poisons Act (Northern Ireland) 1952
No. 10 & 11	
No. 12	The Electoral (Registration Expenses) Regulations (Northern Ireland) 1952
No. 13	The Artificial Insemination (Cattle) Regulations (Northern Ireland) 1952
No. 14	The Health Services (Approval of the Special Care Service Management Scheme) Order (Northern Ireland) 1952
No. 15	The Factories (Forms and Particulars) Order (Northern Ireland) 1952
No. 16	
No. 17	The Health Services (General Dental Services) (Amendment) Regulations (Northern Ireland) 1952
No. 18	The Linen and Cotton Handkerchief and Household Goods and Linen Piece Goods Wages Council (Northern Ireland) Wages Regulations (Amendment) Order (Northern Ireland) 1952
No. 19	The Health Services (General Medical and Pharmaceutical Services) (Amendment) Regulations (Northern Ireland) 1952
No. 20	The Health Services (Supplementary Eye Services) Regulations (Northern Ireland) 1952
No. 21	The Ulster Savings Certificates First Issue (Northern Ireland) 1952
No. 22	The Rate of Interest (Housing) Order (Northern Ireland) 1952
No. 23	
No. 24	The Electoral (Parliamentary Elections) Regulations (Northern Ireland) 1952
No. 25	
No. 26	The Ryegrass Seed (Exemption) Order (Northern Ireland) 1952
No. 27	The Contributions by Local Authorities Regulations (Northern Ireland) 1952
No. 28	The General Waste Materials Reclamation Wages Council (Northern Ireland) Wages Regulations (Holidays) Order (Northern Ireland) 1952
No. 29	
No. 30	The Milk Fund (Winding up) Order (Northern Ireland) 1952
No. 31	The Rope, Twine and Net Wages Council (Northern Ireland) Wages Regulations Order (Northern Ireland) 1952
No. 32	
No. 33	The Baking Wages Council (Northern Ireland) Wages Regulations Order (Northern Ireland) 1952
No. 34	
No. 35	The Prisons Order made under Section 17 of the Criminal Justice Administration Act (Northern Ireland) 1952
No. 36	The Poisons Regulations (Northern Ireland) 1952
No. 37	
No. 38	The Paper Box Wages Council (Northern Ireland) Wages Regulations Order (Northern Ireland) 1952
No. 39	The Linen and Cotton Handkerchief and Household Goods and Linen Piece Goods Wages Council (Northern Ireland) Wages Regulations (Amendment) (No. 2) Order (Northern Ireland) 1952
No. 40	The Tourist Development Loans Regulations (Northern Ireland) 1952
No. 41	The Foyle Fisheries Commission (Appointed Day) Order (Northern Ireland) 1952
No. 42	The Health Services (Medical Practices Compensation) (Amendment) Regulations (Northern Ireland) 1952
No. 43	
No. 44	The Housing (Accounts) Regulations (Northern Ireland) 1952
No. 45	The Business Tenancies (Temporary Provisions) County Court Rules (Northern Ireland) 1952
No. 46	The National Insurance (Claims and Payments) Amendment Regulations (Northern Ireland) 1952
No. 47	
No. 48	The Dungannon Regional Waterworks Joint Board Order (Northern Ireland) 1952
No. 49	The Royal Ulster Constabulary Pay Order (Northern Ireland) 1952
No. 50	The Royal Ulster Constabulary (Women Members) Pay Order (Northern Ireland) 1952
No. 51	The Foyle Area (Licensing of Fishing Engines) Regulations (Northern Ireland) 1952
No. 52	The Foyle Area (Control of Netting) Regulations (Northern Ireland) 1952
No. 53	
No. 54	The Foyle Area (Returns by Licence Holders) Regulations (Northern Ireland) 1952
No. 55	The Agricultural Development Loans Regulations (Northern Ireland) 1952
No. 56	The Coal Distribution (Restriction) Order (Northern Ireland) 1952
No. 57	The Coal Supply (Northern Ireland) (Amendment) (No. 2) Order (Northern Ireland) 1952
No. 58	The Retail Coal Prices Order (Northern Ireland) 1952
No. 59	The Summary Jurisdiction; Petty Sessions Districts and Times: Banbridge (Northern Ireland) 1952
No. 60	The Electoral (Local Government Elections) (No. 2) Regulations (Northern Ireland) 1952
No. 61	The Linen and Cotton Handkerchief and Household Goods and Linen Piece Goods Wages Council (N.I) Wages Regulations (Holidays) (Amendment) Order (Northern Ireland) 1952
No. 62	
No. 63	The Road Vehicles (Part-Year Licensing) Order (Northern Ireland) 1952
No. 64	The Housing (Grants) Order (Northern Ireland) 1952
No. 65	The National Insurance (Overlapping Benefits) Amendment Regulations (Northern Ireland) 1952
No. 66	The Fire Services (Qualifications of Fire Officers) Regulations (Northern Ireland) 1952
No. 67	The Fire Services (Discipline) Regulations (Northern Ireland) 1952
No. 68	The Dangerous Drugs Regulations (Northern Ireland) 1952
No. 69	The Parrots (Prohibition of Import) (Revocation) Regulations (Northern Ireland) 1952
No. 70	The Local Government Superannuation (Northern Ireland and Great Britain) Regulations (Northern Ireland) 1952
No. 71	The Housing on Farms (Grants) Order (Northern Ireland) 1952
No. 72 & 73	
No. 74	The Agricultural Development Loans (No. 2) Regulations (Northern Ireland) 1952
No. 75 - 77	
No. 78	The Employment and Training (Advisory Committees) Regulations (Northern Ireland) 1952
No. 79	
No. 80	The Rent Restriction Law (N.I) County Court Rules (Northern Ireland) 1952
No. 81	The Foot-and-Mouth Disease No. 1 Order (Northern Ireland) 1952
No. 82	The National Assistance (Determination of Need) Amendment Regulations (Northern Ireland) 1952
No. 83	The Shirtmaking Wages Council (Northern Ireland) Wages Regulations (Holidays) Order (Northern Ireland) 1952
No. 84	The Readymade and Wholesale Bespoke Tailoring Wages Council (Northern Ireland) Wages (Holidays) Regulations (Northern Ireland) 1952
No. 85	The Health Services (Charges for Drugs and Appliances) Regulations (Northern Ireland) 1952
No. 86	The Health Services (General Dental Services) (Amendment) (No. 2) Regulations (Northern Ireland) 1952
No. 87	The Health Services (Hospital Charges for Drugs and Appliances etc.) Regulations (Northern Ireland) 1952
No. 88	The Health Services (Travelling Expenses) (Amendment) Regulations (Northern Ireland) 1952
No. 89	The Royal Ulster Constabulary Pensions (Amendment) Order (Northern Ireland) 1952
No. 90	The Retail Bespoke Tailoring Wages Council (Northern Ireland) Wages Regulations Holidays) Order (Northern Ireland) 1952
No. 91	
No. 92	The Foot-and-Mouth Disease (Amendment) No. VII Order (Northern Ireland) 1952
No. 93	The Grammar Schools (Admissions, Scholarships and Special Allowances) (Amendment No. 2) Regulations (Northern Ireland) 1952
No. 94	The Intoxicating Liquor (Compensation Charges) Order (Northern Ireland) 1952
No. 95	The Health Services (Charges) (Amendment) Regulations (Northern Ireland) 1952
No. 96	The Welfare Authorities (Charges for Residential Accommodation) (Amendment) Regulations (Northern Ireland) 1952
No. 97	The Housing Subsidy Order (Northern Ireland) 1952
No. 98	
No. 99	The Foyle Area (Restriction of Netting) (No. 2) Regulations (Northern Ireland) 1952
No. 100	The Foyle Area (River Finn-Weekly Close Time) Regulations (Northern Ireland) 1952
No. 101	The Health Services (Superannuation) (Amendment) Regulations (Northern Ireland) 1952
No. 102	
No. 103	The National Insurance an Industrial Injuries (Reciprocal Agreement with France) Order (Northern Ireland) 1952
No. 104	The Grammar School (Salaries and Allowances of Teachers) Amendment Regulations (Northern Ireland) 1952
No. 105	The Intermediate School (Salaries and Allowances of Teachers) Amendment Regulations (Northern Ireland) 1952
No. 106	The Institutions of Further Education (Salaries and Allowances of Teachers) Amendment Regulations (Northern Ireland) 1952
No. 107	The Primary Schools (Salaries and Allowances) Amendment Regulations (Northern Ireland) 1952
No. 108	The Wholesale Mantle and Costume Wages Council (Northern Ireland) Wages Regulations (Holidays) Order (Northern Ireland) 1952
No. 109	The Ulster Savings Certificates: Fourth Issue (Northern Ireland) 1952
No. 110	The General Medical and Pharmaceutical Services (Amendment) (No. 2) Regulations (Northern Ireland) 1952
No. 111	
No. 112	The National Insurance (Medical Certification) Amendment Regulations (Northern Ireland) 1952
No. 113	The Local Government (Superannuation) (Amendment) Regulations (Northern Ireland) 1952
No. 114	
No. 115	The Pharmaceutical Society of Northern Ireland (General) Regulations (Northern Ireland) 1952
No. 116	The Resident Magistrates (Salaries and Allowances) Order (Northern Ireland) 1952
No. 117	The National Insurance (Industrial Injuries) (Medical Certification) Amendment Regulations (Northern Ireland) 1952
No. 118	The National Insurance (Industrial Injuries) (Claims and Payments) Amendment Regulations (Northern Ireland) 1952
No. 119	The House to House Charitable Collections Regulations (Northern Ireland) 1952
No. 120	
No. 121	The Foyle Area (Prohibition of Freshwater Netting) Regulations (Northern Ireland) 1952
No. 122	The Grammar School (Grant Conditions) Amendment Regulations (Northern Ireland) 1952
No. 123	The Baking Wages Council (Northern Ireland) Wages Regulations (Amendment) (No. 1) Order (Northern Ireland) 1952
No. 124	
No. 125	The Health and Welfare Authorities (Qualifications and Duties of Officers) Regulations (Northern Ireland) 1952
No. 126	The Rural District Councils (Officers Qualifications) Regulations (Northern Ireland) 1952
No. 127	The Borough and Urban District Councils (Officers Qualifications) Regulations (Northern Ireland) 1952
No. 128	
No. 129	The Primary Schools (General) Amendment Regulations (Northern Ireland) 1952
No. 130	The Children and Young Persons (Welfare Authorities' Homes) Regulations (Northern Ireland) 1952
No. 131	The Children and Young Persons (Voluntary Homes) Regulations (Northern Ireland) 1952
No. 132	The Training School Rules (Northern Ireland) 1952
No. 133	The National Insurance (Insurance of Benefit and Miscellaneous Provisions) (Transitional) Regulations (Northern Ireland) 1952
No. 134	The National Insurance (Residence and Persons Abroad) Amendment Regulations (Northern Ireland) 1952
No. 135	The Training Colleges (Admission of Students in 1958) Regulations (Northern Ireland) 1952
No. 136	The Intermediate School (Grant Conditions) Amendment Regulations (Northern Ireland) 1952
No. 137	The National Insurance (Increase of Benefit and Miscellaneous Provisions) Regulations (Northern Ireland) 1952
No. 138	The Trade Scholarships Regulations (Northern Ireland) 1952
No. 139	The National Insurance (Contributions) Amendment Regulations (Northern Ireland) 1952
No. 140	The National Insurance (Industrial Injuries) (Increase of Benefit and Miscellaneous Provisions) Regulations (Northern Ireland) 1952
No. 141	The National Insurance (Claims and Payments) Amendment (No. 2) Regulations (Northern Ireland) 1952
No. 142	The Housing (Houses Built for Letting) (Amendment) Regulations (Northern Ireland) 1952
No. 143	The Housing (Owner Occupation) (Amendment) Regulations (Northern Ireland) 1952
No. 144	The Handicapped Pupils and Special Schools (Amendment) Regulations (Northern Ireland) 1952
No. 145	The Registration and Attendance of Pupils (Amendment) Regulations (Northern Ireland) 1952
No. 146	The Grammar Schools (Grant Conditions) Amendment Regulations No. 2 (Northern Ireland) 1952
No. 147	The National Insurance (Hospital In-Patients) Amendment Regulations (Northern Ireland) 1952
No. 148	The Family Allowances, National Insurance and Industrial Injuries (Commencement) Order (Northern Ireland) 1952
No. 149	
No. 150	The Prevention of Fraud (Investment) Deposits Regulations (Northern Ireland) 1952
No. 151	The Lough Erne (Licensing of Fishing Enquiries) Regulations (Northern Ireland) 1952
No. 152	The Dressmaking and Women's Light Clothing Wages Council (Northern Ireland) Wages Regulations (Holidays) Order (Northern Ireland) 1952
No. 153	The Grammar School (Grant Conditions) Amendment Regulations No. 3 (Northern Ireland) 1952
No. 154	The Foot-and-Mouth Disease No. IX Order (Northern Ireland) 1952
No. 155	The Marketing of Fruit Rules (Northern Ireland) 1952
No. 156	The Housing on Farms (Amendment) Regulations (Northern Ireland) 1952
No. 157	The Ulster Special Constabulary Pensions (Amendment) Regulations (Northern Ireland) 1952
No. 158	The Paper Box Wages Council (Northern Ireland) Wages Regulations (Amendment) Order (Northern Ireland) 1952
No. 159	The Linen and Cotton Handkerchief and Household Goods and Linen Piece Goods Wages Council (Northern Ireland) Wages Regulations (Amendment) (No. 3) Order (Northern Ireland) 1952
No. 160	The Local Government (County Councils) (Travelling Expenses) (Amendment) Regulations (Northern Ireland) 1952
No. 161	
No. 162	The Flax (General) Regulations (Northern Ireland) 1952
No. 163	The Superannuation (Transfers between the Civil Service and Local Government) Rules (Northern Ireland) 1952
No. 164	The Ulster Savings Certificates (Eighth Issue) (Amendment) Regulations (Northern Ireland) 1952
No. 165	The Sheep Dipping (Special Regulations) Order (Northern Ireland) 1952
No. 166	The Non-Contributory Old Age Pensions (Amendment) Regulations (Northern Ireland) 1952
No. 167	The Salaries of Teachers (Special Provisions) Regulations (Northern Ireland) 1952
No. 168	The Foot-and-Mouth Disease No. X Order (Northern Ireland) 1952
No. 169	The Government Loans-Creation of Two Million Pounds of Northern Ireland Loans Stock (Northern Ireland) 1952
No. 170	The Northern Ireland Loans Stock (Rate of Dividend and Redemption) Regulations (Northern Ireland) 1952
No. 171	The Family Allowances (Conditions for Increase of Allowance) Regulations (Northern Ireland) 1952
No. 172	The National Insurance (Seasonal Workers) Amendment Regulations (Northern Ireland) 1952
No. 173	The Health Services (Health Authority Proposals) Regulations (Northern Ireland) 1952
No. 174	The Brush and Broom Wages Council (N.I) Wages Regulations (Amendment) Order (Northern Ireland) 1952
No. 175	The National Insurance (Classification) Amendment Regulations (Northern Ireland) 1952
No. 176	The National Insurance (Children's Allowances and Orphans' Pensions) (Transitional) Regulations (Northern Ireland) 1952
No. 177 & 178	
No. 179	The Foot-and-Mouth Disease (Importation) No. XI Order (Northern Ireland) 1952
No. 180	The Marketing of Ryegrass Seed Regulations (Northern Ireland) 1952
No. 181	The Transport Act (Abandonment of Railway) Order (Northern Ireland) 1952
No. 182	
No. 183	The Foyle Area (Elections to Advisory Council) Regulations (Northern Ireland) 1952
No. 184	The Health Services (Remission of Charges for Dentures) (Hospitals) Regulations (Northern Ireland) 1952
No. 185 & 186	
No. 187	The Milk and Meals Amendment Regulations No. 3 (Northern Ireland) 1952
No. 188	The Scutch Mills and Flax (Fire Insurance) (Amendment) Regulations (Northern Ireland) 1952
No. 189	The Voluntary Grammar Schools Meals Grant Amendment Regulations No. 5 (Northern Ireland) 1952
No. 190	The Ulster Savings Certificates: Supplementary Issue (Northern Ireland) 1952
No. 191	The Landing of Carcases Order (Northern Ireland) 1952
No. 192	The National Assistance (Determination of Need) Amendment (No. 2) Regulations (Northern Ireland) 1952
No. 193	The Road Haulage Wages Council (Northern Ireland) (Variation) Order (Northern Ireland) 1952
No. 194	The Drainage (Notices to Cleanse Watercourses) Regulations (Northern Ireland) 1952
No. 195	The Training Colleges (Scholarships) Amendment Regulations (Northern Ireland) 1952
No. 196	The Laundry Wages Council (Northern Ireland) Wages Regulations Order (Northern Ireland) 1952
No. 197	The Boot and Shoe Repairing Wages Council (Northern Ireland) Wages Regulations (Amendment) Order (Northern Ireland) 1952
No. 198	The General Waste Materials Reclamation Wages Council (Northern Ireland) Wages Regulations (No. 2) Order (Northern Ireland) 1952
No. 199	The National Insurance (Industrial Injuries) (Benefit) Amendment Regulations (Northern Ireland) 1952
No. 200	The Sugar Confectinery and Food Preserving Wages Council (Northern Ireland) Wages Regulations Order (Northern Ireland) 1952
No. 201	The Baking Wages Council (Northern Ireland) Wages Regulations (Amendment) (No. 3) Order (Northern Ireland) 1952
No. 202	The Baking Wages Council (Northern Ireland) Wages Regulations (Amendment) (No. 4) Order (Northern Ireland) 1952
No. 203	The Baking Wages Council (Northern Ireland) Wages Regulations (Amendment) (No. 5) Order (Northern Ireland) 1952
No. 204	The Baking Wages Council (Northern Ireland) Wages Regulations (Amendment) (No. 6) Order (Northern Ireland) 1952
No. 205	The Motor Vehicles (Direction Indicator and Stop Light) (Amendment) Regulations (Northern Ireland) 1952
No. 206	The Road Vehicles (Portstewart, County Londonderry) Regulations (Northern Ireland) 1952
No. 207	The Road Haulage Wages Council (Northern Ireland) Wages Regulations Order (Northern Ireland) 1952
No. 208	The Road Haulage Wages Council (Northern Ireland) Wages Regulations (Holidays) Order (Northern Ireland) 1952
No. 209	The Importation of Forest Trees (Prohibition) Order (Northern Ireland) 1952
No. 210	
No. 211	The Road Vehicles (Registration and Licensing) (Amendment) Regulations (Northern Ireland) 1952
No. 212	The Hydrogen Cyanide (Fumigation of Ships) Regulations (Northern Ireland) 1952
No. 213	The Hydrogen Cyanide (Fumigation of Buildings) Regulations (Northern Ireland) 1952
No. 214	The Employment of Children in Entertainments Regulations (Northern Ireland) 1952
No. 215	
No. 216	The Road Vehicles (Edward Street, Newry, County Down) Regulations (Northern Ireland) 1952
No. 217	The Coal Distribution (Restriction) (Amendment) (No. 1) Order (Northern Ireland) 1952
No. 218	The Malone Training School (Contributions) Regulations (Northern Ireland) 1952
No. 219	The Bacon Industry (Pig Husbandry Research Grant) Order (Northern Ireland) 1952
No. 220	The Foot-and-Mouth Disease No. XII Order (Northern Ireland) 1952
No. 221	The Utility Furniture (Marking and Supply) (Revocation) Order (Northern Ireland) 1952
No. 222	The Aerated Waters Wages Council (Northern Ireland) Wages Regulations (No. 2) Order (Northern Ireland) 1952
No. 223	The Health Services (General Dental Services) (Amendment) (No. 3) Regulations (Northern Ireland) 1952
No. 224	The Increase of Pensions (General) Regulations (Northern Ireland) 1952
No. 225	The Pensions (Increase) (Amendment) Regulations (Northern Ireland) 1952
No. 226	The Increase of Pensions (Calculation of Income) Regulations (Northern Ireland) 1952
No. 227	The Control of Building Operations in 1953 Order (Northern Ireland) 1952
No. 228	The Family Allowances (Qualifications) Amendment Regulations (Northern Ireland) 1952
No. 229	The Census of Production (Exemption) Order (Northern Ireland) 1952
No. 230	The Motor Vehicles (International Motor Insurance Card) Regulations (Northern Ireland) 1952
No. 231	The Health Services (Tribunal) (Amendment) Regulations (Northern Ireland) 1952
No. 232	The Bee Pest Prevention (Amendment) Regulations (Northern Ireland) 1952
No. 233	The Importation of Plants (Amendment) Order (Northern Ireland) 1952
No. 234	The Fishery Development Loans Regulations (Northern Ireland) 1952

== See also ==
- List of statutory rules of Northern Ireland
