= List of statutory rules and orders of Northern Ireland, 1971 =

This is an incomplete list of statutory rules and orders of Northern Ireland during 1962. Statutory rules and orders were the predecessor of statutory rules and they formed the secondary legislation of Northern Ireland between 1922 and 1973.

Number	Title
No. 117	Abrasive Wheels Regulations (Northern Ireland) 1971
No. 248	Foundries (Protective Footwear and Gaiters) Regulations (Northern Ireland) 1971
No. 353	Diseases of Animals (Landing of Waste Foods) Order (Northern Ireland) 1971
No. 372	Shipbuilding and Ship-repairing Regulations (Northern Ireland) 1971

== See also ==
- List of statutory rules of Northern Ireland
