= List of statutory rules of Northern Ireland =

This is an incomplete list of statutory rules of Northern Ireland.

== Statutory rules by year ==
=== 1974–79 ===
- List of statutory rules of Northern Ireland, 1974
- List of statutory rules of Northern Ireland, 1975
- List of statutory rules of Northern Ireland, 1976
- List of statutory rules of Northern Ireland, 1977
- List of statutory rules of Northern Ireland, 1978
- List of statutory rules of Northern Ireland, 1979

=== 1980–89 ===
- List of statutory rules of Northern Ireland, 1980
- List of statutory rules of Northern Ireland, 1981
- List of statutory rules of Northern Ireland, 1982
- List of statutory rules of Northern Ireland, 1983
- List of statutory rules of Northern Ireland, 1984
- List of statutory rules of Northern Ireland, 1985
- List of statutory rules of Northern Ireland, 1986
- List of statutory rules of Northern Ireland, 1987
- List of statutory rules of Northern Ireland, 1988
- List of statutory rules of Northern Ireland, 1989

=== 1990–99 ===
- List of statutory rules of Northern Ireland, 1990
- List of statutory rules of Northern Ireland, 1991
- List of statutory rules of Northern Ireland, 1992
- List of statutory rules of Northern Ireland, 1993
- List of statutory rules of Northern Ireland, 1994
- List of statutory rules of Northern Ireland, 1995
- List of statutory rules of Northern Ireland, 1996
- List of statutory rules of Northern Ireland, 1997
- List of statutory rules of Northern Ireland, 1998
- List of statutory rules of Northern Ireland, 1999

=== 2000–09 ===
- List of statutory rules of Northern Ireland, 2000
- List of statutory rules of Northern Ireland, 2001
- List of statutory rules of Northern Ireland, 2002
- List of statutory rules of Northern Ireland, 2003
- List of statutory rules of Northern Ireland, 2004
- List of statutory rules of Northern Ireland, 2005
- List of statutory rules of Northern Ireland, 2006
- List of statutory rules of Northern Ireland, 2007
- List of statutory rules of Northern Ireland, 2008
- List of statutory rules of Northern Ireland, 2009

=== 2010–19 ===
- List of statutory rules of Northern Ireland, 2010
- List of statutory rules of Northern Ireland, 2011
- List of statutory rules of Northern Ireland, 2012
- List of statutory rules of Northern Ireland, 2013
- List of statutory rules of Northern Ireland, 2014
- List of statutory rules of Northern Ireland, 2015
- List of statutory rules of Northern Ireland, 2016
- List of statutory rules of Northern Ireland, 2017
- List of statutory rules of Northern Ireland, 2018
- List of statutory rules of Northern Ireland, 2019

=== 2020–present ===
- List of statutory rules of Northern Ireland, 2020
- List of statutory rules of Northern Ireland, 2021
- List of statutory rules of Northern Ireland, 2022
- List of statutory rules of Northern Ireland, 2023
- List of statutory rules of Northern Ireland, 2024
- List of statutory rules of Northern Ireland, 2025

== See also ==
- List of statutory rules and orders of Northern Ireland (prior to 1974)
