= List of statutory rules and orders of Northern Ireland, 1964 =

This is an incomplete list of statutory rules and orders of Northern Ireland during 1964. Statutory rules and orders were the predecessor of statutory rules and they formed the secondary legislation of Northern Ireland between 1922 and 1973.

Number	Title
No. 16	Factories (Cleanliness of Walls and Ceilings) Order (Northern Ireland) 1964
No. 46	Non-Ferrous Metals (Melting and Founding) Regulations (Northern Ireland) 1964
No. 85	National Insurance (Reciprocal Agreements with Australia and New Zealand) Order (Northern Ireland) 1964
No. 129	Food Hygiene (General) Regulations (Northern Ireland) 1964

== See also ==
- List of statutory rules of Northern Ireland
