= List of statutory rules and orders of Northern Ireland, 1930 =

This is an incomplete list of statutory rules and orders of Northern Ireland during 1930. Statutory rules and orders were the predecessor of statutory rules and they formed the secondary legislation of Northern Ireland between 1922 and 1973.

Number	Title
0 No. 1	The Gas: Rate of Payment Order (Northern Ireland) 1930
No. 2 & 3	
No. 4	The Gas, Rate of Payment Order (Northern Ireland) 1930
0 No. 5	The Local Government: Procedure of Councils Order (Northern Ireland) 1930
0 No. 6	The Technical Teachers, 1926 Amendment Regulations No. 5 (Northern Ireland) 1930
0 No. 7	The Trade Scholarships Regulations 1927 Amendment Regulations No. 1 (Northern Ireland) 1930
No. 8 & 9	The
0 No. 10	The Petroleum Spirit (Conveyance) Regulations (Northern Ireland) 1930
0 No. 11	The Petroleum-spirit (Motor Vehicles, &c.) Regulations (Northern Ireland) 1930
No. 12 & 13	
0 No. 14	The Teachers' (Secondary and Preparatory) Superannuation (Amendment) Scheme (Northern Ireland) 1930
No. 15	
0 No. 16	The Epizootic Abortion Order (Northern Ireland) 1930
0 No. 17	The Adoption of Children (Duties of Registrars, &c.) Regulations (Northern Ireland) 1930
No. 18	
0 No. 19	The Teachers' (Public Elementary) Superannuation (Amendment) Scheme (Northern Ireland) 1930
0 No. 20	The Petroleum (Carbide of Calcium) Order (Northern Ireland) 1930
0 No. 21	The Petroleum (Mixtures) Order (Northern Ireland) 1930
0 No. 22	The Rules for the Management of the Criminal Lunatic Asylum Order (Northern Ireland) 1930
No. 23 - 27	
0 No. 28	The Housing Grant Rules (Northern Ireland) 1930
0 No. 29	The Housing: Restricted Areas for the purpose of Grants Order (Northern Ireland) 1930
No. 30	
0 No. 31	The Representation of the People Order (Northern Ireland) 1930
No. 32 - 35	
0 No. 36	The Prescription of Building Lines Order (Northern Ireland) 1930
No. 37	
0 No. 38	The Drainage: Transfer of Powers to Ministry of Finance Order (Northern Ireland) 1930
No. 39 - 47	
0 No. 48	The National Health Insurance and Contributory Pensions (Voluntary Contributors) Amendment Regulations (Northern Ireland) 1930
0 No. 49	The Sheep Scab Order (Northern Ireland) 1930
0 No. 50	The Contributory Pensions (Payments on Death) Regulations (Northern Ireland) 1930
0 No. 51	The Contributory Pensions (Pauper Lunatics) Regulations (Northern Ireland) 1930
0 No. 52	The Parrots (Prohibition of Import) Regulations (Northern Ireland) 1930
0 No. 53	The Petroleum (Bisulphide of Carbon) Order (Northern Ireland) 1930
0 No. 54	The Contributory Pensions (Joint Committee) Regulations (Northern Ireland) 1930
No. 55	
0 No. 56	The Contributory Pensions (Exempt and Excepted Persons) Regulations (Northern Ireland) 1930
0 No. 57	The Motor Car (Use and Construction) Amendment Order (Northern Ireland) 1930
0 No. 58	The Cinematograph Films and Gramophone Records Regulations (Northern Ireland) 1930
0 No. 59	The Heavy Motor Car (Speed) Amendment Order (Northern Ireland) 1930
0 No. 60	The Teachers' (Agricultural and Technical) Superannuation (Amendment) Scheme (Northern Ireland) 1930
0 No. 61	The Teachers' (Miscellaneous) Superannuation Scheme (Northern Ireland) 1930
0 No. 62	The Staffing Public Elementary Schools 1928 (Amendment) Regulations No. 2 (Northern Ireland) 1930
0 No. 63	The Noxious Weeds Order (Northern Ireland) 1930
0 No. 64	The Contributory Pensions (Oversea Voluntary Contributors) Regulations (Northern Ireland) 1930
0 No. 65	The Lights on Vehicles Regulations (Northern Ireland) 1930
0 No. 66	The Bisulphide of Carbon (Conveyance) Regulations (Northern Ireland) 1930
0 No. 67	The Secondary School Grants Regulations (Northern Ireland) 1930
0 No. 68	The Payment of Attendance Grants to Technical Schools and Classes, 1926 Amendment Regulations No. 1 (Northern Ireland) 1930
0 No. 69	The Secondary Teachers 1929 Amendment Regulations No. 1 (Northern Ireland) 1930
0 No. 70	The Contributory Pensions (Calculation of Contributions) Amendment Regulations (Northern Ireland) 1930
No. 71	
0 No. 72	The Marketing of Eggs Rules (Northern Ireland) 1930
0 No. 73	The Forms (Probate Civil Bill Decree) Order (Northern Ireland) 1930
0 No. 74	The Unemployment Insurance (Courts of Referees) Regulations (Northern Ireland) 1930
0 No. 75	The Unemployment Insurance (Return of Contributions) (Amendment) Regulations (Northern Ireland) 1930
No. 76 - 78	
0 No. 79	The Aldermen and Councillors of Boroughs Election Order (Northern Ireland) 1930
0 No. 80	The Aldermen and Councillors of County Boroughs Election Order (Northern Ireland) 1930
0 No. 81	The County and Rural District Councillors Election Order (Northern Ireland) 1930
0 No. 82	The Guardians Election Order (Northern Ireland) 1930
No. 83	
0 No. 84	The Urban District Councillors and Town Commissioners Election Order (Northern Ireland) 1930
0 No. 85	The Housing: Restricted Areas for the purpose of Grants (Appointed day) Order (Northern Ireland) 1930
No. 86 - 89	
0 No. 90	The National Health Insurance (Deposit Contributors) Amendment Regulations (Northern Ireland) 1930
0 No. 91	The Union Accounts Order (Northern Ireland) 1930
0 No. 92	The Prisons: Visiting Committees Order (Northern Ireland) 1930
0 No. 93	The Public Service Vehicles (Amendment) Regulations (Northern Ireland) 1930
0 No. 94	The Road Traffic (Mechanical Signals) Regulations (Northern Ireland) 1930
No. 95	
0 No. 96	The Lights on Vehicles Regulations (Northern Ireland) 1930
No. 97	
0 No. 98	The Ulster Loans Stock Order (Northern Ireland) 1930
0 No. 99	The National Health Insurance (Insurance Committees) (Amendment) Regulations (Northern Ireland) 1930
No. 100 & 101	
0 No. 102	The Housing Grant Amendment Rules (Northern Ireland) 1930
No. 103	
0 No. 104	The Intoxicating Liquor Licences: Rates of Charges Order (Northern Ireland) 1930
0 No. 105	The National Health Insurance (Appointed day) Order (Northern Ireland) 1930
0 No. 106	The Estate Duty Order (Northern Ireland) 1930
0 No. 107	The Parliamentary Grant (Education Authorities) Regulations (Northern Ireland) 1930
No. 108	
0 No. 109	The National Health Insurance (Medical Benefit Council) Regulations (Northern Ireland) 1930
0 No. 110	The Unemployment Insurance (Payment of Travelling Expenses) Regulations (Northern Ireland) 1930
0 No. 111	The Unemployment Insurance (Insurance Year) Regulations (Northern Ireland) 1930
0 No. 112	The Fisheries: Pollen, Lough Erne Order (Northern Ireland) 1930
0 No. 113	The Marketing of Potatoes Rules (Northern Ireland) 1930
0 No. 114	The Meeting of Parents Regulations (Northern Ireland) 1930
No. 115	
0 No. 116	The National Health Insurance (Subsidiary Employments) Amendment Order (Northern Ireland) 1930
No. 117	
0 No. 118	The Building and Improvement Grants (Voluntary Schools) Regulations (Northern Ireland) 1930
0 No. 119	The Malone Training School Regulations (Northern Ireland) 1930
0 No. 120	The Unemployment Insurance (Substituted Period) Regulations (Northern Ireland) 1930
0 No. 121	The Unemployment Insurance (Courses of Instruction) (Amendment) Regulations (Northern Ireland) 1930
0 No. 122	The Unemployment Insurance (Associations) Regulations (Northern Ireland) 1930
No. 123	
0 No. 124	The Housing Grant (Amendment) Rules (Northern Ireland) 1930
0 No. 125	The Roads Improvement (Amendment) Regulations (Northern Ireland) 1930
0 No. 126	The National Health Insurance (Joint Committee) Regulations (Northern Ireland) 1930
No. 127 & 128	
0 No. 129	The National Health Insurance (Deposit Contributors Insurance Section) Amendment Regulations (Northern Ireland) 1930
0 No. 130	The Marketing of Dairy Produce Rules (Northern Ireland) 1930
No. 131	
0 No. 132	The Electricity Commissioners' Amendment Rules (Northern Ireland) 1930
0 No. 133	The National Health Insurance Act (Appointed day) Order (Northern Ireland) 1930
No. 134	
No. 135	The Marketing of Potatoes Rules (Northern Ireland) 1930
0 No. 136	The Technical Teachers 1926 Amendment Regulations No. 6 (Northern Ireland) 1930

== See also ==
- List of statutory rules of Northern Ireland
