= List of statutory rules of Northern Ireland, 1991 =

This is an incomplete list of statutory rules of Northern Ireland in 1991.

== 1-100 ==
- Industrial Training (1990 Order) (Commencement No. 2) Order (Northern Ireland) 1991 (S.R. 1991 No. 17)
- Companies (1990 No. 2 Order) (Commencement No. 1) Order (Northern Ireland) 1991 (S.R. 1991 No. 26)
- Companies (Forms) (Amendment) Regulations (Northern Ireland) 1991 (S.R. 1991 No. 27)
- Companies (Unregistered Companies) (Amendment) Regulations (Northern Ireland) 1991 (S.R. 1991 No. 28)
- Alkali, & c. Works Order (Northern Ireland) 1991 (S.R. 1991 No. 49)
- Insider Dealing (Recognised Stock Exchange) Order (Northern Ireland) 1991 (S.R. 19911 No. 52)
- Social Security (Industrial Injuries) (Dependency) (Permitted Earnings Limits) Order (Northern Ireland) 1991 (S.R. 1991 No. 72)
- Social Security (Contributions) (Re-rating) Order (Northern Ireland) 1991 (S.R. 1991 No. 73)
- Social Security Benefits Up-rating Order (Northern Ireland) 1991 (S.R. 1991 No. 77)

== 101-200 ==
- Social Security (1990 Order) (Commencement No. 3) Order (Northern Ireland) 1991 (S.R. 1991 No. 110)
- Financial Provisions (1991 Order) (Commencement) Order (Northern Ireland) 1991 (S.R. 1991 No. 116)
- Education (Modification of Statutory Provisions Relating to Employment) Order (Northern Ireland) 1991 (S.R. 1991 No. 127)
- Statutory Sick Pay (1991 Order) (Commencement) Order (Northern Ireland) 1991 (S.R. 1991 No. 129)
- Health and Personal Social Services (1991 Order) (Commencement No. 1) Order (Northern Ireland) 1991 (S.R. 1991 No. 131)
- Social Security (Norway) Order (Northern Ireland) 1991 (S.R. 1991 No. 139)
- Companies (1990 No. 2 Order) (Commencement No. 2) Order (Northern Ireland) 1991 (S.R. 1991 No. 153)
- Companies (Unregistered Companies) (Amendment No. 2) Regulations (Northern Ireland) 1991 (S.R. 1991 No. 154)
- Companies (Fair Dealing by Directors) (Increase in Financial Limits) Order (Northern Ireland) 1991 (S.R. 1991 No. 155)
- Insider Dealing (Public Servants) Order (Northern Ireland) 1991 (S.R. 1991 No. 156)
- Food Safety (1991 Order) (Commencement) Order (Northern Ireland) 1991 (S.R. 1991 No. 175)

== 201-300 ==
- Criminal Justice (Confiscation) (1990 Order) (Commencement) Order (Northern Ireland) 1991 (S.R. 1991 No. 220)
- Statutory Officers (District Judge) (Northern Ireland) Order 1991 (S.R. 1991 No. 230)
- Companies (1990 Order) (Commencement No. 2) Order (Northern Ireland) 1991 (S.R. 1991 No. 267)
- Companies (Revision of Defective Accounts and Report) Regulations (Northern Ireland) 1991 (S.R. 1991 No. 268)
- Companies (Defective Accounts) (Authorised Person) Order (Northern Ireland) 1991 (S.R. 1991 No. 269)
- Companies (1990 No. 2 Order) (Commencement No. 3) Order (Northern Ireland) 1991 (S.R. 1991 No. 289)
- Companies (Unregistered Companies) (Amendment No. 3) Regulations (Northern Ireland) 1991 (S.R. 1991 No. 290)

== 301-400 ==
- Social Security (Severe Disablement Allowance) (Amendment) Regulations (Northern Ireland) 1991 (S.R. 1991 No. 333)
- The Insolvency Rules (Northern Ireland) 1991 S.R. No. 364)
- Financial Services Act 1986 (Restriction of Right of Action) (Friendly Societies) Regulations (Northern Ireland) 1991 S.R. No. 374)
- Insolvency (Monetary Limits) Order (Northern Ireland) 1991 (S.R. 1991 No. 386)
- Companies (1990 No. 2 Order) (Commencement No. 4) Order (Northern Ireland) 1991 (S.R. 1991 No. 398)

== 401-500 ==
- Companies (1989 Order) (Commencement No. 2) Order (Northern Ireland) 1991 (S.R. 1991 No. 410)
- Insolvency (1989 Order) (Commencement No. 4) Order (Northern Ireland) 1991 (S.R. 1991 No. 411)
- Companies (1990 No. 2 Order) (Commencement No. 5) Order (Northern Ireland) 1991 (S.R. 1991 No. 438)
- Fire Certificates (Special Premises) Regulations (Northern Ireland) 1991 (S.R. 1991 No. 446)
- Companies (1990 Order) (Commencement No. 3) Order (Northern Ireland) 1991 (S.R. 1991 No. 499)
- Companies (1990 Order) (Register of Auditors and Information about Audit Firms) Regulations (Northern Ireland) 1991 (S.R. 1991 No. 500)

== 501-600 ==
- Disability Living Allowance and Disability Working Allowance (1991 Order) (Commencement No. 2) Order (Northern Ireland) 1991 (S.R. 1991 No. 501)
- Students Awards Regulations (Northern Ireland) 1991 (S.R. 1991 No. 508)
- Dangerous Substances in Harbour Areas Regulations (Northern Ireland) 1991 (S.R. 1991 No. 509)
- Fertilisers (Sampling and Analysis) Regulations (Northern Ireland) 1991 (S.R. 1991 No. 540)
- Statutory Rules (Exemption) Regulations (Northern Ireland) 1991 (S.R. 1991 No. 541)
- Social Security (Contributions) (Re-rating) (No. 2) Order (Northern Ireland) 1991 (S.R. 1991 No. 542)
