= List of statutory rules of Northern Ireland, 1992 =

This is an incomplete list of statutory rules of Northern Ireland in 1992.

== 1-100 ==
- Social Security Benefits Up-rating Order (Northern Ireland) 1992 (SR(NI) 1992/18)
- Social Security (Disability Living Allowance) Regulations (Northern Ireland) 1992 S.R. 1992 No. 32
- Social Security (Adjudication) (Amendment) Regulations (Northern Ireland) 1992 S.R. 1992 No. 36
- Social Security (Introduction of Disability Living Allowance) Regulations (Northern Ireland) 1992 S.R. 1992 No. 38
- Electricity (1992 Order) (Commencement No. 1) Order (Northern Ireland) 1992 S.R. 1992 No. 63
- Disability Working Allowance (General) Regulations (Northern Ireland) 1992 S.R. 1992 No. 78

== 101-200 ==
- Social Security (Barbados) Order (Northern Ireland) 1992 (SR(NI) 1992/151)
- Fertilisers Regulations (Northern Ireland) 1992 (SR(NI) 1992/187)

== 201-300 ==
- Births, Deaths and Marriages (Fees) Order (Northern Ireland) 1992 (SR(NI) 1992/217)
- Companies (Disclosure of Interests in Shares) (Orders Imposing Restrictions on Shares) Regulations (Northern Ireland) 1992 (SR(NI) 1992/257)
- Companies (1986 Order) (Bank Accounts) Regulations (Northern Ireland) 1992 (SR(NI) 1992/258)
- Road Traffic (Carriage of Dangerous Substances in Road Tankers and Tank Containers) Regulations (Northern Ireland) 1992 (SR(NI) 1992/260)
- Social Security (Australia) Order (Northern Ireland) 1992 (SR(NI) 1992/269)
- Feeding Stuffs Regulations (Northern Ireland) 1992 (SR(NI) 1992/270)

== 301-400 ==
- Students Awards Regulations (Northern Ireland) 1992 (SR(NI) 1992/363)
- County Courts (Financial Limits) Order (Northern Ireland) 1992 (SR(NI) 1992/372)
- Registration (Land and Deeds) (1992 Order) (Commencement No. 1) Order (Northern Ireland) 1992 (SR(NI) 1992/393)
- Insolvency (Fees) (Amendment) Order (Northern Ireland) 1992 (SR(NI) 1992/398)

== 401-500 ==
- Housing (1992 Order) (Commencement) Order (Northern Ireland) 1992 (SR(NI) 1992/402)
- Companies (Single Member Private Limited Companies) Regulations (Northern Ireland) 1992 (SR(NI) 1992/405)
- Health and Safety (Miscellaneous Provisions) Regulations (Northern Ireland) 1992 (SR(NI) 1992/413)

== 501-600 ==
- Companies (1986 Order) (Accounts of Small and Medium-Sized Enterprises and Publication of Accounts in ECUs) Regulations (Northern Ireland) 1992 (SR(NI) 1992/503)
- Education Reform (1989 Order) (Commencement No. 6) Order (Northern Ireland) 1992 (SR(NI) 1992/507)
- Social Security Benefit (Dependency) (Amendment) Regulations (Northern Ireland) 1992 (SR(NI) 1992/521)
- Local Government (Superannuation) Regulations (Northern Ireland) 1992 (SR(NI) 1992/547)
