= List of statutory rules of Northern Ireland, 2011 =

This is an incomplete list of statutory rules of Northern Ireland in 2011.

== 1-100 ==
- The Student Fees (Amounts) (Amendment) Regulations (Northern Ireland) 2011 (S.R. 2011 No. 1)
- The Solvent Emissions (Amendment) Regulations (Northern Ireland) 2011 (S.R. 2011 No. 2)
- The Motor Vehicles (Approval) (Amendment) Regulations (Northern Ireland) 2011 (S.R. 2011 No. 3)
- Public Health Acts Amendment Act 1907 (Application of sections 82 and 83 to North Down Borough Council) Order (Northern Ireland) 2011 (S.R. 2011 No. 4)
- Public Health Acts Amendment Act 1907 (Application of sections 82 and 83 to Coleraine Borough Council) Order (Northern Ireland) 2011 (S.R. 2011 No. 5)
- Public Health Acts Amendment Act 1907 (Application of sections 82 and 83 to Down District Council) Order (Northern Ireland) 2011 (S.R. 2011 No. 6)
- Public Health Acts Amendment Act 1907 (Application of sections 82 and 83 to Carrickfergus Borough Council) Order (Northern Ireland) 2011 (S.R. 2011 No. 7)
- The Parking Places (Disabled Persons’ Vehicles) (Amendment) Order (Northern Ireland) 2011 (S.R. 2011 No. 8)
- Biomass Processing Challenge Fund (Amendment) Regulations (Northern Ireland) 2011 (S.R. 2011 No. 9)
- The Water Framework Directive (Priority Substances and Classification) Regulations (Northern Ireland) 2011 (S.R. 2011 No. 10)
- The Charities (2008 Act) (Commencement No. 3) Order (Northern Ireland) 2011 (S.R. 2011 No. 11 (C. 1))
- The Charities Act 2008 (Transitional Provision) Order (Northern Ireland) 2011 (S.R. 2011 No. 12)
- The Debt Relief (2010 Act) (Commencement) Order (Northern Ireland) 2011 (S.R. 2011 No. 13 (C. 2))
- The Insolvency (Fees) (Amendment) Order (Northern Ireland) 2011 (S.R. 2011 No. 14)
- The Debt Relief Orders (Designation of Competent Authorities) Regulations (Northern Ireland) 2011 (S.R. 2011 No. 15)
- Rates (Amendment) (2009 Act) (Commencement No. 2) Order (Northern Ireland) 2011 (S.R. 2011 No. 16 (C. 3))
- The Regulation and Improvement Authority (Independent Health Care) (Fees and Frequency of Inspections) (Amendment) Regulations (Northern Ireland) 2011 (S.R. 2011 No. 17)
- The Motor Vehicle Testing (Electronic Communications) Order (Northern Ireland) 2011 (S.R. 2011 No. 18)
- The Road Traffic (Amendment) (1991 Order) (Commencement No. 2) Order (Northern Ireland) 2011 (S.R. 2011 No. 19 (C. 4))
- The Motor Vehicles (Construction and Use) (Amendment) Regulations (Northern Ireland) 2011 (S.R. 2011 No. 20)
- The Motor Vehicles (Driving Licences) (Amendment) Regulations (Northern Ireland) 2011 (S.R. 2011 No. 21)
- The Plant Health (Amendment) Order (Northern Ireland) 2011 (S.R. 2011 No. 22)
- The Motor Vehicles (Electronic Communication of Certificates of Insurance) Order (Northern Ireland) 2011 (S.R. 2011 No. 23)
- The Motor Vehicles (Third-Party Risks) (Amendment) Regulations (Northern Ireland) 2011 (S.R. 2011 No. 24)
- The Fishing Boats (Electronic Transmission of Fishing Activities Data) Scheme (Northern Ireland) 2011 (S.R. 2011 No. 25)
- The Social Security (Work-focused Interviews etc.) (Equalisation of State Pension Age) (Amendment) Regulations (Northern Ireland) 2011 (S.R. 2011 No. 26)
- The Animals and Animal Products (Import and Export) (Amendment) Regulations (Northern Ireland) 2011 (S.R. 2011 No. 27)
- The Plastic Materials and Articles in Contact with Food (Amendment) Regulations (Northern Ireland) 2011 (S.R. 2011 No. 28)
- The Food (Jelly Mini-Cups) (Emergency Control) (Revocation) Regulations (Northern Ireland) 2011 (S.R. 2011 No. 29)
- The Employment Rights (Increase of Limits) Order (Northern Ireland) 2011 (S.R. 2011 No. 30)
- Electricity (Guarantees of Origin of Electricity Produced from Renewable Energy Sources) (Amendment) Regulations (Northern Ireland) 2011 (S.R. 2011 No. 31)
- The Tullyrain Road (Route A26), Banbridge (Abandonment) Order (Northern Ireland) 2011 (S.R. 2011 No. 32)
- The Back Street at Carrick Hill and Library Street, Belfast (Abandonment) Order (Northern Ireland) 2011 (S.R. 2011 No. 33)
- The Candahar Street, Belfast (Abandonment) Order (Northern Ireland) 2011 (S.R. 2011 No. 34)
- The Strangford Lough (Sea Fishing Exclusion Zones) Regulations (Northern Ireland) 2011 (S.R. 2011 No. 35)
- Rates (Unoccupied Hereditaments) Regulations (Northern Ireland) 2011 (S.R. 2011 No. 36)
- The Bramblewood Grove, Banbridge (Footway) (Abandonment) Order (Northern Ireland) 2011 (S.R. 2011 No. 37)
- The Vegetable Seeds (Amendment) Regulations (Northern Ireland) 2011 (S.R. 2011 No. 38)
- The Food Additives (Amendment) Regulations (Northern Ireland) 2011 (S.R. 2011 No. 39)
- Categories of Tourist Establishment Order (Northern Ireland) 2011 (S.R. 2011 No. 40)
- The Healthy Start Scheme and Day Care Food Scheme (Amendment) Regulations (Northern Ireland) 2011 (S.R. 2011 No. 41)
- Rates (Completion Notices) (Financial Adjustments) Regulations (Northern Ireland) 2011 (S.R. 2011 No. 42)
- The Rate Relief (Amendment) Regulations (Northern Ireland) 2011 (S.R. 2011 No. 43)
- Departments (Transfer of Functions) Order (Northern Ireland) 2011 (S.R. 2011 No. 44)
- The Food Labelling (Declaration of Allergens) Regulations (Northern Ireland) 2011 (S.R. 2011 No. 45)
- Reporting of Prices of Milk Products (Amendment) Regulations (Northern Ireland) 2011 (S.R. 2011 No. 46)
- The Fruit Juices and Fruit Nectars (Amendment) Regulations (Northern Ireland) 2011 (S.R. 2011 No. 47)
- The Official Feed and Food Controls (Amendment) Regulations (Northern Ireland) 2011 (S.R. 2011 No. 48)
- The Road Vehicles Lighting (Amendment) Regulations (Northern Ireland) 2011 (S.R. 2011 No. 49)
- Police Service of Northern Ireland and Police Service of Northern Ireland Reserve (Full-Time) (Amendment) Regulations 2011 (S.R. 2011 No. 50)
- The Housing Benefit (Amendment) Regulations (Northern Ireland) 2011 (S.R. 2011 No. 51)
- The Social Security Pensions (Low Earnings Threshold) Order (Northern Ireland) 2011 (S.R. 2011 No. 52)
- The Natural Mineral Water, Spring Water and Bottled Drinking Water (Amendment) Regulations (Northern Ireland) 2011 (S.R. 2011 No. 53)
- The Introductory Tenancies (Disposal of Houses) Order (Northern Ireland) 2011 (S.R. 2011 No. 54)
- The Misuse of Drugs (Licence Fees) Regulations (Northern Ireland) 2011 (S.R. 2011 No. 55)
- The Departments (Transfer of Functions) (No. 2) Order (Northern Ireland) 2011 (S.R. 2011 No. 56)
- The Rates (Housing Executive) Order (Northern Ireland) 2011 (S.R. 2011 No. 57)
- The County Court (Amendment) Rules (Northern Ireland) 2011 (S.R. 2011 No. 58)
- The Magistrates’ Courts (Amendment) Rules (Northern Ireland) 2011 (S.R. 2011 No. 59)
- The Magistrates’ Courts (Criminal Justice (Children)) (Amendment) Rules (Northern Ireland) 2011 (S.R. 2011 No. 60)
- The Magistrates’ Courts (Children (Northern Ireland) Order 1995) (Amendment) Rules (Northern Ireland) 2011 (S.R. 2011 No. 61)
- The Rules of the Court of Judicature (Northern Ireland) (Amendment) 2011 (S.R. 2011 No. 62)
- The Seed Potatoes (Crop Fees) Regulations (Northern Ireland) 2011 (S.R. 2011 No. 63)
- The Family Proceedings (Amendment) Rules (Northern Ireland) 2011 (S.R. 2011 No. 64)
- The County Courts (Financial Limits) Order (Northern Ireland) 2011 (S.R. 2011 No. 65)
- The Social Security Revaluation of Earnings Factors Order (Northern Ireland) 2011 (S.R. 2011 No. 66)
- The Pneumoconiosis, etc., (Workers’ Compensation) (Payment of Claims) (Amendment) Regulations (Northern Ireland) 2011 (S.R. 2011 No. 67)
- The Mesothelioma Lump Sum Payments (Conditions and Amounts) (Amendment) Regulations (Northern Ireland) 2011 (S.R. 2011 No. 68)
- The City of Derry Airport (Control Over Land) Order (Northern Ireland) 2011 (S.R. 2011 No. 69)
- The Student Fees (Qualifying Courses and Persons) (Amendment) Regulations (Northern Ireland) 2011 (S.R. 2011 No. 70)
- The Zoonoses (Fees) Regulations (Northern Ireland) 2011 (S.R. 2011 No. 71)
- The Rates (Regional Rates) Order (Northern Ireland) 2011 (S.R. 2011 No. 72)
- The Rates (Industrial Hereditaments) (Specified Percentage) Order (Northern Ireland) 2011 (S.R. 2011 No. 73)
- The Trunk Road T8 (Randalstown to Toome) Order (Northern Ireland) 2011 (S.R. 2011 No. 74)
- The Planning (General Development) (Amendment) Order (Northern Ireland) 2011 (S.R. 2011 No. 75)
- The Employment and Support Allowance (Limited Capability for Work and Limited Capability for Work-related Activity) (Amendment) Regulations (Northern Ireland) 2011 (S.R. 2011 No. 76)
- The Marine Licensing (Application Fees) Regulations (Northern Ireland) 2011 (S.R. 2011 No. 77)
- The Marine Licensing (Exempted Activities) Order (Northern Ireland) 2011 (S.R. 2011 No. 78)
- The Marine Licensing (Register of Licensing Information) Regulations (Northern Ireland) 2011 (S.R. 2011 No. 79)
- The Marine Licensing (Appeals) Regulations (Northern Ireland) 2011 (S.R. 2011 No. 80)
- The Marine Licensing (Civil Sanctions) Order (Northern Ireland) 2011 (S.R. 2011 No. 81)
- The Whole of Government Accounts (Designation of Bodies) Order (Northern Ireland) 2011 (S.R. 2011 No. 82)
- The Parking Places, Loading Bays and Waiting Restrictions (Armagh) (Amendment) Order (Northern Ireland) 2011 (S.R. 2011 No. 83)
- The Cycle Lanes (Glengall Street and Great Victoria Street, Belfast) (Amendment) Order (Northern Ireland) 2011 (S.R. 2011 No. 84)
- The One-Way Traffic (Belfast) (Amendment) Order (Northern Ireland) 2011 (S.R. 2011 No. 85)
- The Misuse of Drugs (Safe Custody) (Amendment) Regulations (Northern Ireland) 2011 (S.R. 2011 No. 86)
- The Parking Places on Roads (Disabled Persons’ Vehicles) (Amendment) Order (Northern Ireland) 2011 (S.R. 2011 No. 87)
- The Parking Places (Disabled Persons’ Vehicles) (Amendment No. 2) Order (Northern Ireland) 2011 (S.R. 2011 No. 88)
- The Occupational and Personal Pension Schemes (Miscellaneous Amendments) Regulations (Northern Ireland) 2011 (S.R. 2011 No. 89)
- The Social Security (Claims and Payments) (Amendment) Regulations (Northern Ireland) 2011 (S.R. 2011 No. 90)
- The Rate Relief (Low-Carbon Homes Scheme) (Revocation and Savings) Regulations (Northern Ireland) 2011 (S.R. 2011 No. 91)
- The Rate Relief (Energy Efficiency Homes Scheme) (Revocation and Savings) Regulations (Northern Ireland) 2011 (S.R. 2011 No. 92)
- The Loading Bays on Roads (Amendment) Order (Northern Ireland) 2011 (S.R. 2011 No. 93)
- The Road Vehicles Lighting (Amendment No. 2) Regulations (Northern Ireland) 2011 (S.R. 2011 No. 94)
- The Energy (2011 Act) (Commencement) Order (Northern Ireland) 2011 (S.R. 2011 No. 95 (C. 5))
- The Waiting Restrictions (Newry) Order (Northern Ireland) 2011 (S.R. 2011 No. 96)
- The Seed Potatoes (Tuber Inspection Fees) (Amendment) Regulations (Northern Ireland) 2011 (S.R. 2011 No. 97)
- The Trunk Road T8 (Toome to Castledawson) Order (Northern Ireland) 2011 (S.R. 2011 No. 98)
- The Planning (Fees) (Amendment) Regulations (Northern Ireland) 2011 (S.R. 2011 No. 99)
- The County Court (Amendment No. 2) Rules (Northern Ireland) 2011 (S.R. 2011 No. 100)

== 101-200 ==
- The Landfill (Amendment) Regulations (Northern Ireland) 2011 (S.R. 2011 No. 101)
- The Loading Bays on Roads (Amendment No. 2) Order (Northern Ireland) 2011 (S.R. 2011 No. 102)
- The Recovery of Health Services Charges (Amounts) (Amendment) Regulations (Northern Ireland) 2011 (S.R. 2011 No. 103)
- Categories of Tourist Establishment (Statutory Criteria) (Amendment) Regulations (Northern Ireland) 2011 (S.R. 2011 No. 104)
- Statutory Inspection of Tourist Establishments (Fees) Regulations (Northern Ireland) 2011 (S.R. 2011 No. 105)
- Tourism (Amendment) (2011 Act) (Commencement No. 1) Order (Northern Ireland) 2011 (S.R. 2011 No. 106 (C. 6))
- The National Insurance Contributions Credits (Miscellaneous Amendments) Regulations (Northern Ireland) 2011 (S.R. 2011 No. 107)
- The Pensions (2008 No. 2 Act) (Commencement No. 5) Order (Northern Ireland) 2011 (S.R. 2011 No. 108 (C. 7))
- Social Security (Deferral of Retirement Pensions) Regulations (Northern Ireland) 2011 (S.R. 2011 No. 109)
- The Insolvency (Monetary Limits) (Amendment) Order (Northern Ireland) 2011 (S.R. 2011 No. 110)
- The Debt Relief (2010 Act) (Transitional Provision) Order (Northern Ireland) 2011 (S.R. 2011 No. 111)
- The Guaranteed Minimum Pensions Increase Order (Northern Ireland) 2011 (S.R. 2011 No. 112)
- The Pension Protection Fund (Pension Compensation Sharing and Attachment on Divorce etc.) Regulations (Northern Ireland) 2011 (S.R. 2011 No. 113)
- The Pension Protection Fund (Pensions on Divorce etc.: Charges) Regulations (Northern Ireland) 2011 (S.R. 2011 No. 114)
- The Supervision and Treatment Orders (Maximum Period) Order (Northern Ireland) 2011 (S.R. 2011 No. 115)
- Superannuation (Office of the Director and Deputy Director of Public Prosecutions) Order (Northern Ireland) 2011 (S.R. 2011 No. 116)
- Local Government Pension Scheme (Councillors) (Amendment) Regulations (Northern Ireland) 2011 (S.R. 2011 No. 117)
- The Aquatic Animal Health (Amendment) Regulations (Northern Ireland) 2011 (S.R. 2011 No. 118)
- The Social Security Benefits Up-rating Order (Northern Ireland) 2011 (S.R. 2011 No. 119)
- The Social Security Benefits Up-rating Regulations (Northern Ireland) 2011 (S.R. 2011 No. 120)
- The Social Security (Industrial Injuries) (Dependency) (Permitted Earnings Limits) Order (Northern Ireland) 2011 (S.R. 2011 No. 121)
- The Occupational Pension Schemes (Levy Ceiling) Order (Northern Ireland) 2011 (S.R. 2011 No. 122)
- The Pension Protection Fund (Pension Compensation Cap) Order (Northern Ireland) 2011 (S.R. 2011 No. 123)
- The Animal By-Products (Enforcement) Regulations (Northern Ireland) 2011 (S.R. 2011 No. 124)
- The Off-Street Parking (Amendment) Order (Northern Ireland) 2011 (S.R. 2011 No. 125)
- The On-Street Parking (Amendment) Order (Northern Ireland) 2011 (S.R. 2011 No. 126)
- The Waste Regulations (Northern Ireland) 2011 (S.R. 2011 No. 127)
- Pensions Increase (Modification) Regulations (Northern Ireland) 2011 (S.R. 2011 No. 128)
- Pensions Increase (Review) Order (Northern Ireland) 2011 (S.R. 2011 No. 129)
- The Social Fund Maternity and Funeral Expenses (General) (Amendment) Regulations (Northern Ireland) 2011 (S.R. 2011 No. 130)
- The Control of Traffic (Belfast) Order (Northern Ireland) 2011 (S.R. 2011 No. 131)
- The Parking Places on Roads (Belfast) Order (Northern Ireland) 2011 (S.R. 2011 No. 132)
- The One-Way Traffic (Belfast) (Amendment No. 2) Order (Northern Ireland) 2011 (S.R. 2011 No. 133)
- The Rail Passengers’ Rights and Obligations (Exemptions) Regulations (Northern Ireland) 2011 (S.R. 2011 No. 134)
- The Social Security (Miscellaneous Amendments) Regulations (Northern Ireland) 2011 (S.R. 2011 No. 135)
- The Housing Benefit (Miscellaneous Amendments) Regulations (Northern Ireland) 2011 (S.R. 2011 No. 136)
- The Education (Student Loans) (Repayment) (Amendment) Regulations (Northern Ireland) 2011 (S.R. 2011 No. 137)
- The Waiting Restrictions (Londonderry) (Amendment) Order (Northern Ireland) 2011 (S.R. 2011 No. 138)
- The Waiting Restrictions (Kilkeel) Order (Northern Ireland) 2011 (S.R. 2011 No. 139)
- The Waiting Restrictions (Ballymoney) Order (Northern Ireland) 2011 (S.R. 2011 No. 140)
- Land Registration (Amendment) Rules (Northern Ireland) 2011 (S.R. 2011 No. 141)
- The Presbyterian Mutual Society (Financial Assistance to Members) Scheme Regulations (Northern Ireland) 2011 (S.R. 2011 No. 142)
- The Presbyterian Mutual Society Financial Assistance Scheme Regulations (Northern Ireland) 2011 (S.R. 2011 No. 143)
- The Clearway (Route A6, Glenshane Road, Maghera) Order (Northern Ireland) 2011 (S.R. 2011 No. 144)
- The One-Way Traffic (Londonderry) (Amendment) Order (Northern Ireland) 2011 (S.R. 2011 No. 145)
- The Traffic Weight Restriction (Church Place, Lurgan) Order (Northern Ireland) 2011 (S.R. 2011 No. 146)
- The Prohibition of Traffic (O’Neill’s Entry, Carnlough) Order (Northern Ireland) 2011 (S.R. 2011 No. 147)
- The Prohibition of Left-Hand Turn (Belfast) Order (Northern Ireland) 2011 (S.R. 2011 No. 148)
- The Waiting Restrictions (Ballymoney) (No. 2) Order (Northern Ireland) 2011 (S.R. 2011 No. 149)
- The Parking Places on Roads (Enniskillen) Order (Northern Ireland) 2011 (S.R. 2011 No. 150)
- The Insolvency (Amendment) Rules (Northern Ireland) 2011 (S.R. 2011 No. 151)
- The Legal Aid for Crown Court Proceedings (Costs) (Amendment) Rules (Northern Ireland) 2011 (S.R. 2011 No. 152)
- The Misuse of Drugs (Amendment) Regulations (Northern Ireland) 2011 (S.R. 2011 No. 153)
- The Misuse of Drugs (Designation) (Amendment) Order (Northern Ireland) 2011 (S.R. 2011 No. 154)
- The Gas and Electricity (Internal Markets) Regulations (Northern Ireland) 2011 (S.R. 2011 No. 155)
- The Sex Discrimination Order 1976 (Amendment) Regulations (Northern Ireland) 2011 (S.R. 2011 No. 156)
- The Cross-Border Mediation Regulations (Northern Ireland) 2011 (S.R. 2011 No. 157)
- Land Registration (Electronic Communications) Order (Northern Ireland) 2011 (S.R. 2011 No. 158)
- The Employment Act (Northern Ireland) 2011 (Commencement No. 1, Transitional Provisions and Savings) Order (Northern Ireland) 2011 (S.R. 2011 No. 159 (C. 8))
- The Code of Practice (Disciplinary and Grievance Procedures) (Appointed Day) Order (Northern Ireland) 2011 (S.R. 2011 No. 160)
- The Industrial Tribunals (Constitution and Rules of Procedure) (Amendment) Regulations (Northern Ireland) 2011 (S.R. 2011 No. 161)
- The Fair Employment Tribunal (Rules of Procedure) (Amendment) Regulations (Northern Ireland) 2011 (S.R. 2011 No. 162)
- The Transfer of Undertakings and Service Provision Change (Protection of Employment) (Amendment) Regulations (Northern Ireland) 2011 (S.R. 2011 No. 163)
- The Health and Social Services Trusts (Membership and Procedure) Amendment Regulations (Northern Ireland) 2011 (S.R. 2011 No. 164)
- The Regulation and Improvement Authority (Appointments and Procedure) (Amendment) Regulations (Northern Ireland) 2011 (S.R. 2011 No. 165)
- The Northern Ireland Medical and Dental Training Agency (Establishment and Constitution) (Amendment) Order (Northern Ireland) 2011 (S.R. 2011 No. 166)
- The Disability Discrimination Code of Practice (Provision and Use of Transport Vehicles) (Appointed Day) Order (Northern Ireland) 2011 (S.R. 2011 No. 167 (C. 9))
- The Employment Equality (Repeal of Retirement Age Provisions) Regulations (Northern Ireland) 2011 (S.R. 2011 No. 168)
- The Renewables Obligation (Amendment) Order (Northern Ireland) 2011 (S.R. 2011 No. 169)
- The Parking Places (Disabled Persons’ Vehicles) (Amendment No. 3) Order (Northern Ireland) 2011 (S.R. 2011 No. 170)
- The Waiting Restrictions (Markethill) Order (Northern Ireland) 2011 (S.R. 2011 No. 171)
- The Waiting Restrictions (Enniskillen) Order (Northern Ireland) 2011 (S.R. 2011 No. 172)
- The Taxis (Enniskillen) Order (Northern Ireland) 2011 (S.R. 2011 No. 173)
- The Road Races (Cookstown 100) Order (Northern Ireland) 2011 (S.R. 2011 No. 174)
- The Road Races (Drumhorc Hill Climb) Order (Northern Ireland) 2011 (S.R. 2011 No. 175)
- The Off-Street Parking (Amendment No. 2) Order (Northern Ireland) 2011 (S.R. 2011 No. 176)
- The Road Races (Circuit of Ireland International Rally) Order (Northern Ireland) 2011 (S.R. 2011 No. 177)
- The Parking Places (Disabled Persons’ Vehicles) (Amendment No. 4) Order (Northern Ireland) 2011 (S.R. 2011 No. 178)
- The Roads (Speed Limit) Order (Northern Ireland) 2011 (S.R. 2011 No. 179)
- The Road Races (Tandragee 100) Order (Northern Ireland) 2011 (S.R. 2011 No. 180)
- The Road Races (Sperrins Stages Rally) Order (Northern Ireland) 2011 (S.R. 2011 No. 181)
- The Coroners and Justice Act 2009 (Commencement No. 1) (Northern Ireland) Order 2011 (S.R. 2011 No. 182 (C. 10))
- The Road Races (North West 200) Order (Northern Ireland) 2011 (S.R. 2011 No. 183)
- The Road Races (Gortin Hill Climb) Order (Northern Ireland) 2011 (S.R. 2011 No. 184)
- The Cycle Routes (Amendment) Order (Northern Ireland) 2011 (S.R. 2011 No. 185)
- The Colin Road, Belfast (Abandonment) Order (Northern Ireland) 2011 (S.R. 2011 No. 186)
- The Lisburn Road, Ballynahinch (Abandonment) Order (Northern Ireland) 2011 (S.R. 2011 No. 187)
- The Carryduff Road, Temple (Abandonment) Order (Northern Ireland) 2011 (S.R. 2011 No. 188)
- The Shipquay Place, Londonderry (Footway) (Abandonment) Order (Northern Ireland) 2011 (S.R. 2011 No. 189)
- The Private Access at No. 168 Dublin Road, Loughbrickland (Stopping-Up) Order (Northern Ireland) 2011 (S.R. 2011 No. 190)
- The Road Races (Bush, Dungannon) Order (Northern Ireland) 2011 (S.R. 2011 No. 191)
- The Road Races (Cairncastle Hill Climb) Order (Northern Ireland) 2011 (S.R. 2011 No. 192)
- The Parking Places on Roads (Londonderry) Order (Northern Ireland) 2011 (S.R. 2011 No. 193)
- The Prohibition of Waiting (Amendment) Order (Northern Ireland) 2011 (S.R. 2011 No. 194)
- The Parking and Waiting Restrictions (Ballymena) (Amendment) Order (Northern Ireland) 2011 (S.R. 2011 No. 195)
- The Parking Places on Roads (Strabane) (Amendment) Order (Northern Ireland) 2011 (S.R. 2011 No. 196)
- The Waiting Restrictions (Bushmills) (Amendment) Order (Northern Ireland) 2011 (S.R. 2011 No. 197)
- The Waiting Restrictions (Newry) (Amendment) Order (Northern Ireland) 2011 (S.R. 2011 No. 198)
- The Parking Places and Loading Bay on Roads (Limavady) (Amendment) Order (Northern Ireland) 2011 (S.R. 2011 No. 199)
- The Cycle Routes (Amendment No. 2) Order (Northern Ireland) 2011 (S.R. 2011 No. 200)

== 201-300 ==
- The Prohibition of Traffic (Dunluce Street, Larne) (Revocation) Order (Northern Ireland) 2011 (S.R. 2011 No. 201)
- The Parking Places on Roads (Larne) Order (Northern Ireland) 2011 (S.R. 2011 No. 202)
- The Loading Bays on Roads (Amendment No. 3) Order (Northern Ireland) 2011 (S.R. 2011 No. 203)
- The Waiting Restrictions (Larne) Order (Northern Ireland) 2011 (S.R. 2011 No. 204)
- The Taxis (Larne) Order (Northern Ireland) 2011 (S.R. 2011 No. 205)
- Dundrod Circuit (Admission Charges) Regulations (Northern Ireland) 2011 (S.R. 2011 No. 206)
- The A25 Newtown Road, Camlough (Abandonment) Order (Northern Ireland) 2011 (S.R. 2011 No. 207)
- The Rules of the Court of Judicature (Northern Ireland) (Amendment No.2) 2011 (S.R. 2011 No. 208)
- Tourist Establishments (Notices, Certificates and Forms) Regulations (Northern Ireland) 2011 (S.R. 2011 No. 209)
- The Environmental Liability (Prevention and Remediation) (Amendment) Regulations (Northern Ireland) 2011 (S.R. 2011 No. 210)
- Groundwater (Amendment) Regulations (Northern Ireland) 2011 (S.R. 2011 No. 211)
- The Pollution Prevention and Control (Amendment) Regulations (Northern Ireland) 2011 (S.R. 2011 No. 212)
- The Welfare Reform (2010 Act) (Commencement No. 3) Order (Northern Ireland) 2011 (S.R. 2011 No. 213 (C. 11))
- Registered Rents (Increase) Order (Northern Ireland) 2011 (S.R. 2011 No. 214)
- The Wildlife and Natural Environment (2011 Act) (Commencement No.1) Order (Northern Ireland) 2011 (S.R. 2011 No. 215 (C. 12))
- The Conservation (Natural Habitats, etc.) (Amendment) Regulations (Northern Ireland) 2011 (S.R. 2011 No. 216)
- The Food Additives (Amendment) (No.2) Regulations (Northern Ireland) 2011 (S.R. 2011 No. 217)
- The Road Races (Eagles Rock Hill Climb) Order (Northern Ireland) 2011 (S.R. 2011 No. 218)
- The Road Races (Benbradagh Hill Climb) Order (Northern Ireland) 2011 (S.R. 2011 No. 219)
- The Road Races (Craigantlet Hill Climb) Order (Northern Ireland) 2011 (S.R. 2011 No. 220)
- The Road Races (Armoy Motorcycle Race) Order (Northern Ireland) 2011 (S.R. 2011 No. 221)
- The Employment Act (Northern Ireland) 2010 (Commencement and Transitional Provision) Order (Northern Ireland) 2011 (S.R. 2011 No. 222 (C. 13))
- Marketing of Potatoes (Amendment) Regulations (Northern Ireland) 2011 (S.R. 2011 No. 223)
- The Justice (2011 Act) (Commencement No. 1) Order (Northern Ireland) 2011 (S.R. 2011 No. 224 (C. 14))
- The Magistrates’ Courts (Civil Jurisdiction and Judgments Act 1982) (Amendment) Rules (Northern Ireland) 2011 (S.R. 2011 No. 225)
- The Child Support and Social Security (Miscellaneous Amendments) Regulations (Northern Ireland) 2011 (S.R. 2011 No. 226)
- The Local Government (Miscellaneous Provisions) (2010 Act) (Commencement) Order (Northern Ireland) 2011 (S.R. 2011 No. 227 (C. 15))
- The Local Government (Contracts) Regulations (Northern Ireland) 2011 (S.R. 2011 No. 228)
- The Rules of the Court of Judicature (Northern Ireland) (Amendment No.3) 2011 (S.R. 2011 No. 229)
- The Crown Court (Amendment) Rules (Northern Ireland) 2011 (S.R. 2011 No. 230)
- The Social Security (Industrial Injuries) (Prescribed Diseases) (Amendment) Regulations (Northern Ireland) 2011 (S.R. 2011 No. 231)
- The Waste (Fees and Charges etc.) (Amendment) Regulations (Northern Ireland) 2011 (S.R. 2011 No. 232)
- The Plant Health (Amendment No. 2) Order (Northern Ireland) 2011 (S.R. 2011 No. 233)
- The Strategic Investment and Regeneration of Sites (Maze/Long Kesh Development Corporation) Order (Northern Ireland) 2011 (S.R. 2011 No. 234)
- The Passenger and Goods Vehicles (Community Recording Equipment Regulation) Regulations (Northern Ireland) 2011 (S.R. 2011 No. 235)
- The Plastic Kitchenware (Conditions on Imports from China) Regulations (Northern Ireland) 2011 (S.R. 2011 No. 236)
- The Industrial Court (Membership) Regulations (Northern Ireland) 2011 (S.R. 2011 No. 237)
- The Chemical Analysis of Water Status (Technical Specifications) Regulations (Northern Ireland) 2011 (S.R. 2011 No. 238)
- The Controls on Ozone-Depleting Substances Regulations (Northern Ireland) 2011 (S.R. 2011 No. 239)
- The Ozone-Depleting Substances (Qualifications) Regulations (Northern Ireland) 2011 (S.R. 2011 No. 240)
- The Housing (Amendment) (2011 Act) (Commencement) Order (Northern Ireland) 2011 (S.R. 2011 No. 241 (C. 16))
- The Road Traffic Fixed Penalties (Enforcement of Fines) (Amendment) Regulations (Northern Ireland) 2011 (S.R. 2011 No. 242)
- The Family Proceedings (Amendment No. 2) Rules (Northern Ireland) 2011 (S.R. 2011 No. 243)
- The Divorce and Dissolution etc. (Pension Protection Fund) Regulations (Northern Ireland) 2011 (S.R. 2011 No. 244)
- The Welfare of Animals (2011 Act) (Commencement and Transitional Provisions No.1) Order (Northern Ireland) 2011 (S.R. 2011 No. 245 (C. 17))
- The Loading Bays on Roads (Amendment No. 4) Order (Northern Ireland) 2011 (S.R. 2011 No. 246)
- Electricity (Published Criteria for Generating Station) Regulations (Northern Ireland) 2011 (S.R. 2011 No. 247)
- Eggs and Chicks (Amendment) Regulations (Northern Ireland) 2011 (S.R. 2011 No. 248)
- The Industrial Training Levy (Construction Industry) Order (Northern Ireland) 2011 (S.R. 2011 No. 249)
- The Road Races (Ulster Grand Prix Bike Week) Order (Northern Ireland) 2011 (S.R. 2011 No. 250)
- The Road Races (Mid-Antrim 150) Order (Northern Ireland) 2011 (S.R. 2011 No. 251)
- The Road Races (Garron Point Hill Climb) Order (Northern Ireland) 2011 (S.R. 2011 No. 252)
- The Parking Places on Roads (Lisburn) Order (Northern Ireland) 2011 (S.R. 2011 No. 253)
- The Prohibition of Right-Hand Turn (Enniskillen) Order (Northern Ireland) 2011 (S.R. 2011 No. 254)
- The One-Way Traffic (Ballymoney) (Amendment) Order (Northern Ireland) 2011 (S.R. 2011 No. 255)
- The Health and Personal Social Services (Superannuation), Health and Social Care (Pension Scheme) (Amendment) Regulations (Northern Ireland) 2011 (S.R. 2011 No. 256)
- The Parking and Waiting Restrictions (Moy) Order (Northern Ireland) 2011 (S.R. 2011 No. 257)
- The Animal By-Products (Enforcement) (Amendment) Regulations (Northern Ireland) 2011 (S.R. 2011 No. 258)
- The Parking Places (Disabled Persons’ Vehicles) (Amendment No. 5) Order (Northern Ireland) 2011 (S.R. 2011 No. 259)
- The Welfare Reform (2007 Act) (Commencement No. 9) Order (Northern Ireland) 2011 (S.R. 2011 No. 260 (C. 18))
- The Railways (Safety Management) (Amendment) Regulations (Northern Ireland) 2011 (S.R. 2011 No. 261)
- The Further Education (Student Support) (Eligibility) Regulations (Northern Ireland) 2011 (S.R. 2011 No. 262)
- The Foyle Area and Carlingford Area (Prohibition of Unlicensed Fishing) (Prescribed Species) Regulations 2011 (S.R. 2011 No. 263)
- The Charities (Interim Manager) Regulations (Northern Ireland) 2011 (S.R. 2011 No. 264)
- The Employment and Support Allowance (Work-related Activity) Regulations (Northern Ireland) 2011 (S.R. 2011 No. 265)
- The Road Races (Ulster Rally) Order (Northern Ireland) 2011 (S.R. 2011 No. 266)
- The Parking Places on Roads (Newry) (Amendment) Order (Northern Ireland) 2011 (S.R. 2011 No. 267)
- The Parking and Waiting Restrictions (Irvinestown) Order (Northern Ireland) 2011 (S.R. 2011 No. 268)
- The Prohibition of Traffic (North Belfast) Order (Northern Ireland) 2011 (S.R. 2011 No. 269)
- The Prohibition of Traffic (Ardoyne, Belfast) Order (Northern Ireland) 2011 (S.R. 2011 No. 270)
- The Road Races (Spelga Hill Climb) Order (Northern Ireland) 2011 (S.R. 2011 No. 271)
- The Road Races (Croft Hill Climb) Order (Northern Ireland) 2011 (S.R. 2011 No. 272)
- The Parking Places (Disabled Persons’ Vehicles) (Amendment No. 6) Order (Northern Ireland) 2011 (S.R. 2011 No. 273)
- The Parking Places (Disabled Persons’ Vehicles) (Amendment No. 7) Order (Northern Ireland) 2011 (S.R. 2011 No. 274)
- The Eskragh Road (U1104), Granville, Dungannon (Stopping-Up) Order (Northern Ireland) 2011 (S.R. 2011 No. 275)
- The Disert Road, Draperstown (Abandonment) Order (Northern Ireland) 2011 (S.R. 2011 No. 276)
- The Additional Statutory Paternity Pay (General) (Amendment) Regulations (Northern Ireland) 2011 (S.R. 2011 No. 277)
- The Dogs (Fixed Penalty) Regulations (Northern Ireland) 2011 (S.R. 2011 No. 278)
- The Dogs (Licensing and Identification) Regulations (Northern Ireland) 2011 (S.R. 2011 No. 279)
- The Occupational Pension Schemes (Assignment, Forfeiture, Bankruptcy etc.) (Amendment) Regulations (Northern Ireland) 2011 (S.R. 2011 No. 280)
- The Dogs (Amendment) (2011 Act) (Commencement No.1) Order (Northern Ireland) 2011 (S.R. 2011 No. 281 (C. 19))
- The Parking and Waiting Restrictions (Belfast) (Amendment) Order (Northern Ireland) 2011 (S.R. 2011 No. 282)
- The Factories Act (Northern Ireland) 1965 and Office and Shop Premises Act (Northern Ireland) 1966 (Repeals and Modifications) Regulations (Northern Ireland) 2011 (S.R. 2011 No. 283)
- The Extraction Solvents in Food (Amendment) Regulations (Northern Ireland) 2011 (S.R. 2011 No. 284)
- The Wildlife and Natural Environment (2011 Act) (Commencement No.2) Order (Northern Ireland) 2011 (S.R. 2011 No. 285 (C. 20))
- The Road Traffic (2007 Order) (Commencement No. 7) Order (Northern Ireland) 2011 (S.R. 2011 No. 286 (C. 21))
- The Road Traffic (Fixed Penalty) (Offences) (Amendment) Order (Northern Ireland) 2011 (S.R. 2011 No. 287)
- The Road Traffic (Fixed Penalty) (Amendment) Order (Northern Ireland) 2011 (S.R. 2011 No. 288)
- The Radioactive Substances Exemption (Northern Ireland) Order 2011 (S.R. 2011 No. 289)
- The Radioactive Substances Act 1993 (Amendment) Regulations (Northern Ireland) 2011 (S.R. 2011 No. 290)
- The Social Security (Loss of Benefit) (Amendment) Regulations (Northern Ireland) 2011 (S.R. 2011 No. 291)
- The Medicines (Miscellaneous Amendments) Order 2011 (S.R. 2011 No. 292)
- The Housing Benefit (Amendment No. 2) Regulations (Northern Ireland) 2011 (S.R. 2011 No. 293)
- The Bus Lanes (Shore Road, York Road and York Street, Belfast) Order (Northern Ireland) 2011 (S.R. 2011 No. 294)
- Plant Protection Products Regulations (Northern Ireland) 2011 (S.R. 2011 No. 295)
- The Social Security (Exemption from Claiming Retirement Pension) Regulations (Northern Ireland) 2011 (S.R. 2011 No. 296)
- The Foyle Area (Angling Permits) Regulations 2011 (S.R. 2011 No. 297)
- The Social Security (Electronic Communications) Order (Northern Ireland) 2011 (S.R. 2011 No. 298)
- The Loading Bays on Roads (Amendment No. 5) Order (Northern Ireland) 2011 (S.R. 2011 No. 299)
- The Roads (Speed Limit) (No. 2) Order (Northern Ireland) 2011 (S.R. 2011 No. 300)

== 301-400 ==
- The Public Service Vehicles (Amendment) Regulations (Northern Ireland) 2011 (S.R. 2011 No. 301)
- The Public Service Vehicles (Conditions of Fitness, Equipment and Use) (Amendment) Regulations (Northern Ireland) 2011 (S.R. 2011 No. 302)
- The Motor Vehicles (Construction and Use) (Amendment No. 2) Regulations (Northern Ireland) 2011 (S.R. 2011 No. 303)
- The Public Service Vehicles Accessibility (Amendment) Regulations (Northern Ireland) 2011 (S.R. 2011 No. 304)
- The Occupational Pension Schemes (Contracting-out) (Amendment) Regulations (Northern Ireland) 2011 (S.R. 2011 No. 305)
- The Local Government Finance (2011 Act) (Commencement) Order (Northern Ireland) 2011 (S.R. 2011 No. 306 (C. 22))
- The Parking Places (Disabled Persons' Vehicles) (Amendment No. 8) Order (Northern Ireland) 2011 (S.R. 2011 No. 307)
- The Waiting Restrictions (Enniskillen) (Amendment) Order (Northern Ireland) 2011 (S.R. 2011 No. 308)
- The Parking and Waiting Restrictions (Omagh) (No. 2) Order (Amendment) Order (Northern Ireland) 2011 (S.R. 2011 No. 309)
- The Waiting Restrictions (Dundonald) Order (Northern Ireland) 2011 (S.R. 2011 No. 310)
- The Control of Traffic (Bangor) (Amendment) Order (Northern Ireland) 2011 (S.R. 2011 No. 311)
- The Waste and Contaminated Land (Amendment) (2011 Act) (Commencement No. 1) Order (Northern Ireland) 2011 (S.R. 2011 No. 312 (C. 23))
- The Off-Street Parking (Amendment No. 3) Order (Northern Ireland) 2011 (S.R. 2011 No. 313)
- The Donaghadee Road, Groomsport (Abandonment) Order (Northern Ireland) 2011 (S.R. 2011 No. 314)
- Poultrymeat Regulations (Northern Ireland) 2011 (S.R. 2011 No. 315)
- The One-Way Traffic (Newtownabbey) (Amendment) Order (Northern Ireland) 2011 (S.R. 2011 No. 316)
- The Parking Places on Roads (Newtownabbey) Order (Northern Ireland) 2011 (S.R. 2011 No. 317)
- The Waiting Restrictions (Newtownabbey) (Amendment) Order (Northern Ireland) 2011 (S.R. 2011 No. 318)
- The Parking Places on Roads (Glengormley) Order (Northern Ireland) 2011 (S.R. 2011 No. 319)
- The Healthy Start Scheme and Day Care Food Scheme (Amendment No.2) Regulations (Northern Ireland) 2011 (S.R. 2011 No. 320)
- The Bus Lane (Victoria Street, Belfast) Order (Northern Ireland) 2011 (S.R. 2011 No. 321)
- The Parking Places, Loading Bays and Waiting Restrictions (Coleraine) Order (Northern Ireland) 2011 (S.R. 2011 No. 322)
- The Civil Registration (2011 Act) (Commencement No1) Order (Northern Ireland) 2011 (S.R. 2011 No. 323 (C. 24))
- Fisheries (Amendment) Regulations (Northern Ireland) 2011 (S.R. 2011 No. 324)
- Eel Fishing (Amendment) Regulations (Northern Ireland) 2011 (S.R. 2011 No. 325)
- Local Government (Capital Finance and Accounting) Regulations (Northern Ireland) 2011 (S.R. 2011 No. 326)
- The Health and Personal Social Services (General Medical Services Contracts)(Prescription of Drugs Etc.) (Amendment) Regulations (Northern Ireland) 2011 (S.R. 2011 No. 327)
- The Motor Vehicles (Construction and Use) (Amendment No. 3) Regulations (Northern Ireland) 2011 (S.R. 2011 No. 328)
- The Road Vehicles Lighting (Amendment No. 3) Regulations (Northern Ireland) 2011 (S.R. 2011 No. 329)
- The Price Marking (Amendment) Order (Northern Ireland) 2011 (S.R. 2011 No. 330)
- The Weights and Measures (Packaged Goods) Regulations (Northern Ireland) 2011 (S.R. 2011 No. 331)
- The Dogs (Amendment) (2011 Act) (Commencement No.2) Order (Northern Ireland) 2011 (S.R. 2011 No. 332 (C. 25))
- The Cycle Routes (Amendment No. 3) Order (Northern Ireland) 2011 (S.R. 2011 No. 333)
- The Waiting Restrictions (Newry) (No. 2) Order (Northern Ireland) 2011 (S.R. 2011 No. 334)
- The Waiting Restrictions (Dungannon) (Amendment) Order (Northern Ireland) 2011 (S.R. 2011 No. 335)
- The Route F1361 Hawthorn Walk (Footpath), Highfield Heights, Craigavon (Abandonment) Order (Northern Ireland) 2011 (S.R. 2011 No. 336)
- The Orchard Drive, Portadown (Footway) (Abandonment) Order (Northern Ireland) 2011 (S.R. 2011 No. 337)
- The Housing Executive (Indemnities for Members and Officers) Order (Northern Ireland) 2011 (S.R. 2011 No. 338)
- The Homeless Persons Advice and Assistance Regulations (Northern Ireland) 2011 (S.R. 2011 No. 339)
- The Trunk Road T10 (Shannaragh Realignment) Order (Northern Ireland) 2011 (S.R. 2011 No. 340)
- The Dogwood Walk Footpath, Route F1386, Craigavon (Abandonment) Order (Northern Ireland) 2011 (S.R. 2011 No. 341)
- The Old Mill Heights, Millbrook, Larne (Abandonment) Order (Northern Ireland) 2011 (S.R. 2011 No. 342)
- The Footpath between Ballymacash Road and Prince William Road, Lisburn (Abandonment) Order (Northern Ireland) 2011 (S.R. 2011 No. 343)
- The Hanover Glen, Bangor (Abandonment) Order (Northern Ireland) 2011 (S.R. 2011 No. 344)
- The Former Road (including footpath) at the Westlink, Belfast (Abandonment) Order (Northern Ireland) 2011 (S.R. 2011 No. 345)
- The Ballyblaugh Road, Newry (Abandonment) Order (Northern Ireland) 2011 (S.R. 2011 No. 346)
- The Registration of Deeds (Fees) Order (Northern Ireland) 2011 (S.R. 2011 No. 347)
- Land Registry (Fees) Order (Northern Ireland) 2011 (S.R. 2011 No. 348)
- Cattle Identification (Notification of Births, Deaths and Movements) (Amendment) Regulations (Northern Ireland) 2011 (S.R. 2011 No. 349)
- THE AGENCY WORKERS REGULATIONS (NORTHERN IRELAND) 2011 (S.R. 2011 No. 350)
- The Seed Potatoes (Amendment) Regulations (Northern Ireland) 2011 (S.R. 2011 No. 351)
- The Plant Health (Amendment No.3) Order (Northern Ireland) 2011 (S.R. 2011 No. 352)
- The Cycle Routes (Amendment No. 4) Order (Northern Ireland) 2011 (S.R. 2011 No. 353)
- The Prohibition of Traffic (Thorndale Avenue, Belfast) Order (Northern Ireland) 2011 (S.R. 2011 No. 354)
- The Parking Places (Disabled Persons’ Vehicles) (Amendment No. 9) Order (Northern Ireland) 2011 (S.R. 2011 No. 355)
- The Social Security (Disability Living Allowance, Attendance Allowance and Carer’s Allowance) (Miscellaneous Amendments) Regulations (Northern Ireland) 2011 (S.R. 2011 No. 356)
- The Social Security (Miscellaneous Amendments No. 2) Regulations (Northern Ireland) 2011 (S.R. 2011 No. 357)
- The Extinguishment of Right to Use Vehicles on Roads (Strabane) Order (Northern Ireland) 2011 (S.R. 2011 No. 358)
- The Prohibition of Traffic (Avoniel, Belfast) Order (Northern Ireland) 2011 (S.R. 2011 No. 359)
- The Fire and Rescue Services (Emergencies) Order (Northern Ireland) 2011 (S.R. 2011 No. 360)
- The Waiting Restrictions (Newry) (2011 Order) (Amendment) Order (Northern Ireland) 2011 (S.R. 2011 No. 361)
- The Parking Places on Roads Castlecaulfield) Order (Northern Ireland) 2011 (S.R. 2011 No. 362)
- The Foyle Area and Carlingford Area (Tagging and Logbook) (Amendment) Regulations 2011 (S.R. 2011 No. 363)
- The M1/Trunk Road T3 (Motorway Service Area) Order (Northern Ireland) 2011 (S.R. 2011 No. 364)
- The Carriage of Dangerous Goods and Use of Transportable Pressure Equipment (Amendment) Regulations (Northern Ireland) 2011 (S.R. 2011 No. 365)
- The Control of Traffic (Armagh) Order (Northern Ireland) 2011 (S.R. 2011 No. 366)
- The Debt Relief Orders (Designation of Competent Authorities) (Amendment) Regulations (Northern Ireland) 2011 (S.R. 2011 No. 367)
- The Social Security (Work-focused Interviews for Lone Parents and Partners) (Amendment) Regulations (Northern Ireland) 2011 (S.R. 2011 No. 368)
- The Student Fees (Amounts) (Amendment) (No. 2) Regulations (Northern Ireland) 2011 (S.R. 2011 No. 369)
- The Justice (2011 Act) (Commencement No. 2) Order (Northern Ireland) 2011 (S.R. 2011 No. 370 (C. 26))
- Criminal Justice (Northern Ireland) Order 2008 (Commencement No. 7) Order 2011 (S.R. 2011 No. 371 (C. 27))
- The Further Education Teachers’ (Eligibility) (Amendment) Regulations (Northern Ireland) 2011 (S.R. 2011 No. 372)
- The Landfill Allowances Scheme (Amendment) Regulations (Northern Ireland) 2011 (S.R. 2011 No. 373)
- The Smoke Control Areas (Authorised Fuels) Regulations (Northern Ireland) 2011 (S.R. 2011 No. 374)
- The Local Government (Rates Support Grant) Regulations (Northern Ireland) 2011 (S.R. 2011 No. 375)
- The Student Fees (Qualifying Courses and Persons) (Amendment) (No. 2) Regulations (Northern Ireland) 2011 (S.R. 2011 No. 376)
- The Rates (Information Requirement) (Appointed Day) Order (Northern Ireland) 2011 (S.R. 2011 No. 377)
- The Rates (Appeals) (Amendment) Regulations (Northern Ireland) 2011 (S.R. 2011 No. 378)
- The Road Traffic (Fixed Penalty) (Offences) (Amendment No. 2) Order (Northern Ireland) 2011 (S.R. 2011 No. 379)
- The Crossbill Place, Lisburn (Footpaths) (Abandonment) Order (Northern Ireland) 2011 (S.R. 2011 No. 380)
- The Lagmore Road, Lisburn (Abandonment) Order (Northern Ireland) 2011 (S.R. 2011 No. 381)
- The Parking Places on Roads (Whiteabbey) Order (Northern Ireland) 2011 (S.R. 2011 No. 382)
- The Social Fund (Cold Weather Payments) (General) (Amendment) Regulations (Northern Ireland) 2011 (S.R. 2011 No. 383)
- The Plant Health (Import Inspection Fees) (Amendment) Regulations (Northern Ireland) 2011 (S.R. 2011 No. 384)
- Control of Pollution (Oil Storage) (Amendment) Regulations (Northern Ireland) 2011 (S.R. 2011 No. 385)
- The Planning (2011 Act) (Commencement No.1) Order (Northern Ireland) 2011 (S.R. 2011 No. 386 (C. 28))
- The Planning (2011 Act) (Transitional Provisions) Order (Northern Ireland) 2011 (S.R. 2011 No. 387)
- The Nitrates Action Programme (Amendment) Regulations (Northern Ireland) 2011 (S.R. 2011 No. 388)
- The Insolvency Practitioners and Insolvency Account (Fees) (Amendment) Order (Northern Ireland) 2011 (S.R. 2011 No. 389)
- The Insolvency (Fees) (Amendment No. 2) Order (Northern Ireland) 2011 (S.R. 2011 No. 390)
- The Insolvency (Deposits) (Amendment) Order (Northern Ireland) 2011 (S.R. 2011 No. 391)
- The Prohibition of Traffic (Lower Ormeau, Belfast) (Amendment) Order (Northern Ireland) 2011 (S.R. 2011 No. 392)
- The Prohibition of Traffic (The Mount and Willowfield, Belfast) (Amendment) Order (Northern Ireland) 2011 (S.R. 2011 No. 393)
- The Ballyrobin Road (Route C28), Templepatrick (Abandonment) Order (Northern Ireland) 2011 (S.R. 2011 No. 394)
- The Rates (Payments by Owners by Agreement) (Amendment) Order (Northern Ireland) 2011 (S.R. 2011 No. 395)
- The Legal Aid in Criminal Proceedings (Costs) (Amendment) Rules (Northern Ireland) 2011 (S.R. 2011 No. 396)
- The Fodder Plant Seeds (Amendment) Regulations (Northern Ireland) 2011 (S.R. 2011 No. 397)
- The Planning (Fees) (Amendment No. 2) Regulations (Northern Ireland) 2011 (S.R. 2011 No. 398)
- The One-Way Traffic (Belfast) (Amendment No. 3) Order (Northern Ireland) 2011 (S.R. 2011 No. 399)
- The Parking and Waiting Restrictions (Strabane) Order (Northern Ireland) 2011 (S.R. 2011 No. 400)

== 401-500 ==
- The Roads (Speed Limit) (No. 3) Order (Northern Ireland) 2011 (S.R. 2011 No. 401)
- The Pollution Prevention and Control (Amendment No.2) Regulations (Northern Ireland) 2011 (S.R. 2011 No. 402)
- The Waste Management Licensing (Amendment) Regulations (Northern Ireland) 2011 (S.R. 2011 No. 403)
- The Planning (General Development) (Amendment No. 2) Order (Northern Ireland) 2011 (S.R. 2011 No. 404)
- The Banning Orders (Prescribed Persons) Order (Northern Ireland) 2011 (S.R. 2011 No. 405)
- The Education (2006 Order) (Commencement No.3) Order (Northern Ireland) 2011 (S.R. 2011 No. 406 (C. 29))
- The Welfare of Animals (Slaughter or Killing) (Amendment) Regulations (Northern Ireland) 2011 (S.R. 2011 No. 407)
- Police Service of Northern Ireland and Police Service of Northern Ireland Reserve (Full-Time) (Severance) (Amendment) Regulations 2011 (S.R. 2011 No. 408)
- The Damages (Asbestos-related Conditions) (2011 Act) (Commencement) Order (Northern Ireland) 2011 (S.R. 2011 No. 409 (C. 30))
- Superannuation (Commissioner for Older People for Northern Ireland) Order (Northern Ireland) 2011 (S.R. 2011 No. 410)
- The Labour Relations Agency (Code of Practice on Disciplinary and Grievance Procedures) (Jurisdictions) Order (Northern Ireland) 2011 (S.R. 2011 No. 411)
- The Loading Bays on Roads (Amendment No. 6) Order (Northern Ireland) 2011 (S.R. 2011 No. 412)
- The One-Way Traffic (Belfast) (Amendment No. 4) Order (Northern Ireland) 2011 (S.R. 2011 No. 413)
- The Taxis (Enniskillen) (Amendment) Order (Northern Ireland) 2011 (S.R. 2011 No. 414)
- The Occupational Pensions (Revaluation) Order (Northern Ireland) 2011 (S.R. 2011 No. 415)
- The Goods Vehicles (Testing) (Amendment) Regulations (Northern Ireland) 2011 (S.R. 2011 No. 416)
- The Magistrates’ Courts (Banning Orders) Rules (Northern Ireland) 2011 (S.R. 2011 No. 417)
- The Magistrates’ Courts (Amendment No. 2) Rules (Northern Ireland) 2011 (S.R. 2011 No. 418)
- The Criminal Appeal (Prosecution Appeals) (Banning Orders) Rules (Northern Ireland) 2011 (S.R. 2011 No. 419)
- The Crown Court (Amendment No. 2) Rules (Northern Ireland) 2011 (S.R. 2011 No. 420)
- The County Court (Amendment No. 3) Rules (Northern Ireland) 2011 (S.R. 2011 No. 421)
- The Rules of the Court of Judicature (Northern Ireland) (Amendment No.4) 2011 (S.R. 2011 No. 422)
- The Drumnabreeze Road and Lough Road, Gamblestown, Donaghcloney (Abandonment) Order (Northern Ireland) 2011 (S.R. 2011 No. 423)
- The Parking and Waiting Restrictions (Portadown) Order (Northern Ireland) 2011 (S.R. 2011 No. 424)
- The Parking Places on Roads (Lisburn) (No. 2) Order (Northern Ireland) 2011 (S.R. 2011 No. 425)
- The Shipquay Place, Londonderry (No. 2) (Footway) (Abandonment) Order (Northern Ireland) 2011 (S.R. 2011 No. 426)
- The Employer’s Liability (Compulsory Insurance) (Amendment) Regulations (Northern Ireland) 2011 (S.R. 2011 No. 427)
- The Criminal Justice Act 1988 (Reviews of Sentencing) Order (Northern Ireland) 2011 (S.R. 2011 No. 428)
- The Less Favoured Area Compensatory Allowances Regulations (Northern Ireland) 2011 (S.R. 2011 No. 429)
- The Welfare Reform (2010 Act) (Commencement No. 4) Order (Northern Ireland) 2011 (S.R. 2011 No. 430 (C. 31))
- The Social Security (Electronic Communications) (No. 2) Order (Northern Ireland) 2011 (S.R. 2011 No. 431)
- The Motor Vehicles (Access to Driver Licensing Records) Regulations (Northern Ireland) 2011 (S.R. 2011 No. 432)
- The Road Traffic (2007 Order) (Commencement No. 8) Order (Northern Ireland) 2011 (S.R. 2011 No. 433 (C. 32))
- The Social Security (Contribution Conditions for Jobseeker’s Allowance and Employment and Support Allowance) Regulations (Northern Ireland) 2011 (S.R. 2011 No. 434)
- The Northern Ireland Poultry Health Assurance Scheme (Fees) Order (Northern Ireland) 2011 (S.R. 2011 No. 435)
- The Northern Ireland Poultry Health Assurance Scheme Order (Northern Ireland) 2011 (S.R. 2011 No. 436)
- The Zoonoses (Amendment) Order (Northern Ireland) 2011 (S.R. 2011 No. 437)
- The Trade in Animals and Related Products Regulations (Northern Ireland) 2011 (S.R. 2011 No. 438)
- The Roads (Speed Limit) (No. 4) Order (Northern Ireland) 2011 (S.R. 2011 No. 439)
- The Non-Commercial Movement of Pet Animals Order (Northern Ireland) 2011 (S.R. 2011 No. 440)
- The Pensions (2008 No. 2 Act) (Commencement No. 6) Order (Northern Ireland) 2011 (S.R. 2011 No. 441 (C. 33))
- The Medicines Act 1968 (Pharmacy) Order 2011 (S.R. 2011 No. 442)
