= List of statutory rules of Northern Ireland, 1993 =

This is an incomplete list of statutory rules of Northern Ireland in 1993.

== 1-100 ==
- Provision and Use of Work Equipment Regulations (Northern Ireland) 1993 (S.R. 1993 No. 18)
- Personal Protective Equipment at Work Regulations (Northern Ireland) 1993 (S.R. 1993 No. 20)
- Radioactive Substances Act 1948 (Repeals) Regulations (Northern Ireland) 1993 (S.R. 1993 No. 24)
- Workplace (Health, Safety and Welfare) Regulations (Northern Ireland) 1993 (S.R. 1993 No. 37)
- Environmental Information Regulations (Northern Ireland) 1993 (S.R. 1993 No. 45)
- Social Security (Contributions) (Re-rating) Order (Northern Ireland) 1993 (S.R. 1993 No. 60)
- Companies (1990 Order) (Commencement No. 4) Order (Northern Ireland) 1993 (S.R. 1993 No. 63)
- Companies (1990 No. 2 Order) (Commencement No. 6) Order (Northern Ireland) 1993 (S.R. 1993 No. 64)
- Companies (1986 Order) (Disclosure of Remuneration for Non-Audit Work) Regulations (Northern Ireland) 1993 (S.R. 1993 No. 65)
- Companies (Inspection and Copying of Registers, Indices and Documents) Regulations (Northern Ireland) 1993 (S.R. 1993 No. 66)
- Companies (1990 Order) (Eligibility for Appointment as Company Auditor) (Consequential Amendments) Regulations (Northern Ireland) 1993 (S.R. 1993 No. 67)
- Registered Homes (1992 Order) (Commencement) Order (Northern Ireland) 1993 (S.R. 1993 No. 75)
- Road Traffic (Carriage of Explosives) Regulations (Northern Ireland) 1993 (S.R. 1993 No. 83)

== 101-200 ==
- Health and Personal Social Services (Assessment of Resources) Regulations (Northern Ireland) 1993 (S.R. 1993 No. 127)
- Social Security (Contributions) (Amendment No. 5) Regulations (Northern Ireland) 1993 (S.R. 1993 No. 130)
- Health and Safety (Enforcing Authority) Regulations (Northern Ireland) 1993 (S.R. 1993 No. 147)
- Social Security Benefits Up-rating Order (Northern Ireland) 1993 (S.R. 1993 No. 150)
- Social Security (Industrial Injuries) (Dependency) (Permitted Earnings Limits) Order (Northern Ireland) 1993 (S.R. 1993 No. 151)
- Statutory Sick Pay (Rate of Payment) Order (Northern Ireland) 1993 (S.R. 1993 No. 152)
- Child Support (Northern Ireland) Order 1991 (Consequential Amendments) Order (Northern Ireland) 1993 (S.R. 1993 No. 157)
- Social Security Benefits Up-rating Regulations (Northern Ireland) 1993 (S.R. 1993 No. 159)
- Part XXIII Companies and Credit and Financial Institutions (Branch Disclosure) Regulations (Northern Ireland) 1993 (S.R. 1993 No. 198)
- Companies (1986 Order) (Disclosure of Branches and Bank Accounts) Regulations (Northern Ireland) 1993 (S.R. 1993 No. 199)
- Companies (Forms) (Amendment) Regulations (Northern Ireland) 1993 (S.R. 1993 No. 200)

== 201-300 ==
- Belfast Harbour (Variation of Limits) Order (Northern Ireland) 1993 (S.R. 1993 No. 204)
- Companies (1986 Order) (Amendment of Articles 258 and 259) Regulations (Northern Ireland) 1993 (S.R. 1993 No. 220)
- County Courts (Financial Limits) Order (Northern Ireland) 1993 (S.R. 1993 No. 282)

== 301-400 ==
- Lifting Plant and Equipment (Records of Test and Examination etc.) Regulations (Northern Ireland) 1993 (S.R. 1993 No. 366)
- Offshore Safety (Repeals and Modifications) Regulations (Northern Ireland) 1993 (S.R. 1993 No. 384)

== 401-500 ==
- Animals (Scientific Procedures) Act (Amendment) Order (Northern Ireland) 1993 (S.R. 1993 No. 407)
- Chemicals (Hazard Information and Packaging) Regulations (Northern Ireland) 1993 (S.R. 1993 No. 412)
- Administration of Estates (Rights of Surviving Spouse) Order (Northern Ireland) 1993 (S.R. 1993 No. 426)
- Social Security (Contributions) (Miscellaneous Amendments) Regulations (Northern Ireland) 1993 (S.R. 1993 No. 437)
- Industrial Relations (1993 Order) (Commencement No. 1) Order (Northern Ireland) 1993 (S.R. 1993 No. 476)
- Social Security (Severe Disablement Allowance) (Amendment) Regulations (Northern Ireland) 1993 (S.R. 1993 No. 487)
- Departments (Transfer of Functions) (No. 3) Order (Northern Ireland) 1993 (S.R. 1993 No. 494)
