= List of statutory rules of Northern Ireland, 1984 =

This is an incomplete list of statutory rules of Northern Ireland in 1984.

- Building Societies (Accounts and Annual Return) Regulations (Northern Ireland) 1984 (SR(NI) 1984/334)
