= List of statutory rules of Northern Ireland, 2010 =

This is an incomplete list of statutory rules of Northern Ireland in 2010.

== 1-100 ==
- The Building (Amendment) Regulations (Northern Ireland) 2010 (S.R. 2010 No. 1)
- The Wild Birds (Special Protection) (Northern Ireland) Order 2010 (S.R. 2010 No. 2)
- The Rates (Regional Rates) Order (Northern Ireland) 2010 (S.R. 2010 No. 3)
- Rates (Small Business Hereditament Relief) Regulations (Northern Ireland) 2010 (S.R. 2010 No. 4)
- The Dangerous Wild Animals (Northern Ireland) Order 2004 (Modification) Order (Northern Ireland) 2010 (S.R. 2010 No. 5)
- The Social Security (Miscellaneous Amendments) Regulations (Northern Ireland) 2010 (S.R. 2010 No. 6)
- The Seed Potatoes (Amendment) Regulations (Northern Ireland) 2010 (S.R. 2010 No. 7)
- The Housing Benefit (War Pension Disregards Amendment) Regulations (Northern Ireland) 2010 (S.R. 2010 No. 8)
- Legal Aid (Scope) Regulations (Northern Ireland) 2010 (S.R. 2010 No. 9)
- Legal Advice and Assistance (Amendment) Regulations (Northern Ireland) 2010 (S.R. 2010 No. 10)
- Land Registry (Fees) Order (Northern Ireland) 2010 (S.R. 2010 No. 11)
- The Magistrates’ Courts (Amendment) Rules (Northern Ireland) 2010 (S.R. 2010 No. 12)
- The Magistrates’ Courts (Counter Terrorism Act 2008) (Foreign Travel Restriction Orders) Rules (Northern Ireland) 2010 (S.R. 2010 No. 13)
- The Magistrates’ Courts (Detention and Forfeiture of Seized Cash) (Amendment) Rules (Northern Ireland) 2010 (S.R. 2010 No. 14)
- The Magistrates’ Courts (Sexual Offences Act 2003) (Amendment) Rules (Northern Ireland) 2010 (S.R. 2010 No. 15)
- The Magistrates’ Courts (Anti-social Behaviour Orders) (Amendment) Rules (Northern Ireland) 2010 (S.R. 2010 No. 16)
- The Rates (Exemption for Automatic Telling Machines in Rural Areas) Order (Northern Ireland) 2010 (S.R. 2010 No. 17)
- The Rates (Amendment) Regulations (Northern Ireland) 2010 (S.R. 2010 No. 18)
- School Admissions (Exceptional Circumstances) Regulations (Northern Ireland) 2010 (S.R. 2010 No. 19)
- The Pensions (2008 Act) (Supplementary Provision) Order (Northern Ireland) 2010 (S.R. 2010 No. 20)
- The Rates (Social Sector Value) (Amendment) Regulations (Northern Ireland) 2010 (S.R. 2010 No. 21)
- The Health and Personal Social Services (Superannuation Scheme, Compensation for Premature Retirement and Additional Voluntary Contributions), and Health and Social Care (Pension Scheme) (Amendment) Regulations (Northern Ireland) 2010 (S.R. 2010 No. 22)
- The Passenger and Goods Vehicles (Recording Equipment) (Downloading and Retention of Data) Regulations (Northern Ireland) 2010 (S.R. 2010 No. 23)
- The Specified Animal Pathogens (Amendment) Order (Northern Ireland) 2010 (S.R. 2010 No. 24)
- The Airports (Sale of Aircraft) Regulations (Northern Ireland) 2010 (S.R. 2010 No. 25)
- The Parking and Waiting Restrictions (Dromore) Order (Northern Ireland) 2010 (S.R. 2010 No. 26)
- Electricity and Gas (Billing) (No. 2) Regulations (Northern Ireland) 2010 (S.R. 2010 No. 27)
- The Lough Neagh (Levels) Scheme (Confirmation) Order (Northern Ireland) 2010 (S.R. 2010 No. 28)
- The Ionising Radiation (Medical Exposure) (Amendment) Regulations (Northern Ireland) 2010 (S.R. 2010 No. 29)
- Safeguarding Vulnerable Groups (Regulated Activity, Devolution Alignment and Miscellaneous Provisions) Order (Northern Ireland) 2010 (S.R. 2010 No. 30)
- Safeguarding Vulnerable Groups (Prescribed Criteria and Miscellaneous Provisions) (Amendment) Regulations (Northern Ireland) 2010 (S.R. 2010 No. 31)
- The Pension Protection Fund and Occupational Pension Schemes (Miscellaneous Amendments) Regulations (Northern Ireland) 2010 (S.R. 2010 No. 32)
- The Food for Particular Nutritional Uses (Miscellaneous Amendments) Regulations (Northern Ireland) 2010 (S.R. 2010 No. 33)
- The Road Races (Cookstown 100) Order (Northern Ireland) 2010 (S.R. 2010 No. 34)
- The Dill Road, Castlereagh (Abandonment) Order (Northern Ireland) 2010 (S.R. 2010 No. 35)
- Criminal Justice (Northern Ireland) Order 2008 (Commencement No.6 and Transitional Provision) Order 2010 (S.R. 2010 No. 36 (C. 1))
- Non-Domestic Rating (Unoccupied Hereditaments) (Amendment) Regulations (Northern Ireland) 2010 (S.R. 2010 No. 37)
- The Rates (Payment of Interest) (Amendment) Regulations (Northern Ireland) 2010 (S.R. 2010 No. 38)
- The Footpath to rear of Ballyronan Park, Rathcoole, Newtownabbey (Abandonment) Order (Northern Ireland) 2010 (S.R. 2010 No. 39)
- The Horse Passports Regulations (Northern Ireland) 2010 (S.R. 2010 No. 40)
- The Less Favoured Area Compensatory Allowances Regulations (Northern Ireland) 2010 (S.R. 2010 No. 41)
- The Police and Criminal Evidence (Application to Revenue and Customs) Order (Northern Ireland) 2007 (Amendment) Order 2010 (S.R. 2010 No. 42)
- The Police Service of Northern Ireland Pensions (Amendment) Regulations 2010 (S.R. 2010 No. 43)
- The Road Races (Cairncastle Hill Climb) Order (Northern Ireland) 2010 (S.R. 2010 No. 44)
- The Disabled Persons (Badges for Motor Vehicles) (Amendment) Regulations (Northern Ireland) 2010 (S.R. 2010 No. 45)
- The Police and Criminal Evidence (Application to the Police Ombudsman)(Amendment) Order (Northern Ireland) 2010 (S.R. 2010 No. 46)
- Police (Unsatisfactory Performance and Attendance) Regulations (Northern Ireland) 2010 (S.R. 2010 No. 47)
- The Plant Health (Wood and Bark) (Amendment) Order (Northern Ireland) 2010 (S.R. 2010 No. 48)
- The Rules of the Court of Judicature (Northern Ireland) (Amendment) 2010 (S.R. 2010 No. 49)
- The Pensions (2008 No. 2 Act) (Commencement No. 4) Order (Northern Ireland) 2010 (S.R. 2010 No. 50 (C. 2))
- Horse Racing (Charges on Bookmakers) Order (Northern Ireland) 2010 (S.R. 2010 No. 51)
- The Justice (Northern Ireland) Act 2002 (Commencement No. 13) Order 2010 (S.R. 2010 No. 52 (C. 3))
- The Pneumoconiosis, etc., (Workers’ Compensation) (Payment of Claims) (Amendment) Regulations (Northern Ireland) 2010 (S.R. 2010 No. 53)
- The Fish Labelling Regulations (Northern Ireland) 2010 (S.R. 2010 No. 54)
- The Social Security (Medical Evidence) and Statutory Sick Pay (Medical Evidence) (Amendment) Regulations (Northern Ireland) 2010 (S.R. 2010 No. 55)
- The Social Security (State Pension and National Insurance Credits) Regulations (Northern Ireland) 2010 (S.R. 2010 No. 56)
- The Scrapie (Fees) (Amendment) Regulations (Northern Ireland) 2010 (S.R. 2010 No. 57)
- The Social Security (Persons Serving a Sentence of Imprisonment Detained in Hospital) Regulations (Northern Ireland) 2010 (S.R. 2010 No. 58)
- The Carriage of Explosives Regulations (Northern Ireland) 2010 (S.R. 2010 No. 59)
- The Health and Safety (Fees) Regulations (Northern Ireland) 2010 (S.R. 2010 No. 60)
- The Employment Rights (Revision of Limits) Order (Northern Ireland) 2010 (S.R. 2010 No. 61)
- The Social Security (Maximum Additional Pension) Regulations (Northern Ireland) 2010 (S.R. 2010 No. 62)
- The Rates (Deferment) Regulations (Northern Ireland) 2010 (S.R. 2010 No. 63)
- The Planning (Management of Waste from Extractive Industries) Regulations (Northern Ireland) 2010 (S.R. 2010 No. 64)
- The Health and Personal Social Services (Assessment of Resources) (Amendment) Regulations (Northern Ireland) 2010 (S.R. 2010 No. 65)
- The Rate Relief (Low-Carbon Homes Scheme) Regulations (Northern Ireland) 2010 (S.R. 2010 No. 66)
- The Rate Relief (Energy Efficiency Homes Scheme) Regulations (Northern Ireland) 2010 (S.R. 2010 No. 67)
- The Natural Mineral Water, Spring Water and Bottled Drinking Water (Amendment) Regulations (Northern Ireland) 2010 (S.R. 2010 No. 68)
- The Social Security (Miscellaneous Amendments No. 2) Regulations (Northern Ireland) 2010 (S.R. 2010 No. 69)
- The Diseases of Animals (2010 Act) (Commencement and Transitional Provisions) Order (Northern Ireland) 2010 (S.R. 2010 No. 70 (C. 4))
- The Charges for Drugs and Appliances (Abolition) and Supply of Appliances Regulations (Northern Ireland) 2010 (S.R. 2010 No. 71)
- The Pharmaceutical Services (Amendment) Regulations (Northern Ireland) 2010 (S.R. 2010 No. 72)
- The Occupational Pension Schemes (Levy Ceiling) Order (Northern Ireland) 2010 (S.R. 2010 No. 73)
- The Pension Protection Fund (Pension Compensation Cap) Order (Northern Ireland) 2010 (S.R. 2010 No. 74)
- The Mental Health Review Tribunal (Amendment) Rules (Northern Ireland) 2010 (S.R. 2010 No. 76)
- The Charity Tribunal Rules (Northern Ireland) 2010 (S.R. 2010 No. 77)
- The Trade Union Ballots and Elections (Independent Scrutineer Qualifications) Order (Northern Ireland) 2010 (S.R. 2010 No. 78)
- The Recognition and Derecognition Ballots (Qualified Persons) (Amendment) Order (Northern Ireland) 2010 (S.R. 2010 No. 79)
- The Pension Protection Fund (Miscellaneous Amendments) Regulations (Northern Ireland) 2010 (S.R. 2010 No. 80)
- The Social Security (Miscellaneous Amendments No. 3) Regulations (Northern Ireland) 2010 (S.R. 2010 No. 81)
- The Social Security (Contributions Credits for Parents and Carers) Regulations (Northern Ireland) 2010 (S.R. 2010 No. 82)
- The Food Hygiene (Amendment) Regulations (Northern Ireland) 2010 (S.R. 2010 No. 83)
- The Waste Management Licensing (Fees and Charges for Carriers and Exempt Activities) (Amendment) Regulations (Northern Ireland) 2010 (S.R. 2010 No. 84)
- The Road Races (Circuit of Ireland International Rally) Order (Northern Ireland) 2010 (S.R. 2010 No. 85)
- The Ballynamony Lane, Lurgan (Abandonment) Order (Northern Ireland) 2010 (S.R. 2010 No. 86)
- The One-Way Traffic (Londonderry) (Amendment) Order (Northern Ireland) 2010 (S.R. 2010 No. 87)
- The Extinguishment of Right to Use Vehicles on Roads (Londonderry) Order (Northern Ireland) 2010 (S.R. 2010 No. 88)
- The Road Races (Drumhorc Hill Climb) Order (Northern Ireland) 2010 (S.R. 2010 No. 89)
- The Juries (Amendment) Regulations (Northern Ireland) 2010 (S.R. 2010 No. 90)
- The Education (Student Loans) (Repayment) (Amendment) Regulations (Northern Ireland) 2010 (S.R. 2010 No. 91)
- The Environment (Northern Ireland) Order 2002 (Amendment) Regulations (Northern Ireland) 2010 (S.R. 2010 No. 92)
- Legal Aid (General) (Amendment) Regulations (Northern Ireland) 2010 (S.R. 2010 No. 93)
- The Road Races (Benbradagh Hill Climb) Order (Northern Ireland) 2010 (S.R. 2010 No. 94)
- The Cascum Road, Banbridge (Abandonment) Order (Northern Ireland) 2010 (S.R. 2010 No. 95)
- The Social Security Pensions (Low Earnings Threshold) Order (Northern Ireland) 2010 (S.R. 2010 No. 96)
- The Social Security Revaluation of Earnings Factors Order (Northern Ireland) 2010 (S.R. 2010 No. 97)
- The Healthy Start Scheme and Day Care Food Scheme (Amendment) Regulations (Northern Ireland) 2010 (S.R. 2010 No. 98)
- The Organic Farming (Amendment) Regulations (Northern Ireland) 2010 (S.R. 2010 No. 99)
- The Pensions (2005 Order) (Commencement No. 14) Order (Northern Ireland) 2010 (S.R. 2010 No. 100 (C. 5))

== 101-200 ==
- The Pensions Regulator Tribunal (Transfer of Functions) (2010 Act) (Commencement) Order (Northern Ireland) 2010 (S.R. 2010 No. 101 (C. 6))
- The Pensions Regulator Tribunal (Transfer of Functions) (2010 Act) (Consequential Provisions) Order (Northern Ireland) 2010 (S.R. 2010 No. 102)
- The Social Security (Equalisation of State Pension Age) Regulations (Northern Ireland) 2010 (S.R. 2010 No. 103)
- The Valuation Tribunal (Amendment) Rules (Northern Ireland) 2010 (S.R. 2010 No. 104)
- The Retention of Knives in Court Regulations (Northern Ireland) 2010 (S.R. 2010 No. 105)
- The Occupational Pension Schemes (Fraud Compensation Payments) (Amendment) Regulations (Northern Ireland) 2010 (S.R. 2010 No. 106)
- The Police and Criminal Evidence (1989 Order) (Codes of Practice) (Temporary Modification to Code A) Order (Northern Ireland) 2010 (S.R. 2010 No. 107)
- The Occupational and Personal Pension Schemes (Miscellaneous Amendments) Regulations (Northern Ireland) 2010 (S.R. 2010 No. 108)
- The Social Security (Credits) (Amendment) Regulations (Northern Ireland) 2010 (S.R. 2010 No. 109)
- The Social Security Benefit (Persons Abroad) (Amendment) Regulations (Northern Ireland) 2010 (S.R. 2010 No. 110)
- The Occupational Pension Schemes (Employer Debt and Miscellaneous Amendments) Regulations (Northern Ireland) 2010 (S.R. 2010 No. 111)
- Police (Northern Ireland) Act 2000 (Renewal of Temporary Provisions) Order 2010 (S.R. 2010 No. 112)
- The Justice (Northern Ireland) Act 2002 (Commencement No.14) Order 2010 (S.R. 2010 No. 113 (C. 7))
- The Justice (Northern Ireland) Act 2004 (Commencement No.4) Order 2010 (S.R. 2010 No. 114 (C. 8))
- The County Court (Amendment) Rules (Northern Ireland) 2010 (S.R. 2010 No. 115)
- The Judgment Enforcement (Amendment) Rules (Northern Ireland) 2010 (S.R. 2010 No. 116)
- The Recovery of Health Services Charges (Amounts) (Amendment) Regulations (Northern Ireland) 2010 (S.R. 2010 No. 117)
- The Social Security Benefits Up-rating Order (Northern Ireland) 2010 (S.R. 2010 No. 118)
- The Social Security Benefits Up-rating Regulations (Northern Ireland) 2010 (S.R. 2010 No. 119)
- The Social Security (Industrial Injuries) (Dependency) (Permitted Earnings Limits) Order (Northern Ireland) 2010 (S.R. 2010 No. 120)
- The Transfer Values (Disapplication) Regulations (Northern Ireland) 2010 (S.R. 2010 No. 121)
- The Occupational and Personal Pension Schemes (Automatic Enrolment) Regulations (Northern Ireland) 2010 (S.R. 2010 No. 122)
- The Employers’ Duties (Implementation) Regulations (Northern Ireland) 2010 (S.R. 2010 No. 123)
- The Charges for Residues Surveillance Regulations (Northern Ireland) 2010 (S.R. 2010 No. 124)
- The Eggs and Chicks Regulations (Northern Ireland) 2010 (S.R. 2010 No. 125)
- The River Bann Navigation Order (Northern Ireland) 2010 (S.R. 2010 No. 126)
- The Natural Mineral Water, Spring Water and Bottled Drinking Water (Amendment) (No.2) Regulations (Northern Ireland) 2010 (S.R. 2010 No. 127)
- The Water Supply (Water Quality) (Amendment) Regulations (Northern Ireland) 2010 (S.R. 2010 No. 128)
- The Social Security (Claims and Payments) (Amendment) Regulations (Northern Ireland) 2010 (S.R. 2010 No. 129)
- The Smoke Control Areas (Authorised Fuels) (Amendment) Regulations (Northern Ireland) 2010 (S.R. 2010 No. 130)
- The Private Water Supplies (Amendment) Regulations (Northern Ireland) 2010 (S.R. 2010 No. 131)
- The Train Driving Licences and Certificates Regulations (Northern Ireland) 2010 (S.R. 2010 No. 132)
- The Northern Ireland Court Service (Abolition and Transfer of Functions) Order (Northern Ireland) 2010 (S.R. 2010 No. 133)
- The Renewables Obligation (Amendment) Order (Northern Ireland) 2010 (S.R. 2010 No. 134)
- The Education (Levels of Progression for Key Stages 1, 2 and 3) (Transitional) Order (Northern Ireland) 2010 (S.R. 2010 No. 135)
- The Teachers’ (Compensation for Redundancy and Premature Retirement) Regulations (Northern Ireland) 2010 (S.R. 2010 No. 136)
- The Teachers’ Pensions (Amendment) Regulations (Northern Ireland) 2010 (S.R. 2010 No. 137)
- The Mesothelioma Lump Sum Payments (Conditions and Amounts) (Amendment) Regulations (Northern Ireland) 2010 (S.R. 2010 No. 138)
- The Road Races (Croft Hill Climb) Order (Northern Ireland) 2010 (S.R. 2010 No. 139)
- The Roads (Speed Limit) Order (Northern Ireland) 2010 (S.R. 2010 No. 140)
- The Donaghadee Harbour Order (Northern Ireland) 2010 (S.R. 2010 No. 141)
- The Criminal Evidence (Northern Ireland) Order 1999 (Commencement No. 7) Order 2010 (S.R. 2010 No. 142 (C. 9))
- The Identification and Traceability of Explosives Regulations (Northern Ireland) 2010 (S.R. 2010 No. 143)
- The Jobseeker's Allowance (Lone Parents) (Availability for Work) Regulations (Northern Ireland) 2010 (S.R. 2010 No. 144)
- Safeguarding Vulnerable Groups (2007 Order) (Commencement No.6 and Safeguarding Vulnerable Groups (2007 Order) (Commencement No.5, Transitional Provisions and Savings) (Amendment)) Order (Northern Ireland) 2010 (S.R. 2010 No. 145 (C. 10))
- The Legal Aid in Criminal Proceedings (Costs) (Amendment) Rules (Northern Ireland) 2010 (S.R. 2010 No. 146)
- The Department of Justice (2010 Act) (Commencement) Order (Northern Ireland) 2010 (S.R. 2010 No. 147 (C. 11))
- The Misuse of Drugs (Amendment) Regulations (Northern Ireland) 2010 (S.R. 2010 No. 148)
- The Misuse of Drugs (Designation) (Amendment) Order (Northern Ireland) 2010 (S.R. 2010 No. 149)
- The Waiting Restrictions (Downpatrick) Order (Northern Ireland) 2010 (S.R. 2010 No. 150)
- The Greenhouse Gas Emissions Trading Scheme Charging Scheme Regulations (Northern Ireland) 2010 (S.R. 2010 No. 151)
- The Foyle Area (Control of Oyster Fishing) (Amendment) Regulations 2010 (S.R. 2010 No. 153)
- The Foyle Area and Carlingford Area (Angling) (Amendment) Regulations 2010 (S.R. 2010 No. 154)
- The Beef and Veal Labelling Regulations (Northern Ireland) 2010 (S.R. 2010 No. 155)
- The Road Races (North West 200) Order (Northern Ireland) 2010 (S.R. 2010 No. 156)
- The Water Supply (Domestic Distribution Systems) Regulations (Northern Ireland) 2010 (S.R. 2010 No. 157)
- The Road Races (Tour of the Sperrins Rally) Order (Northern Ireland) 2010 (S.R. 2010 No. 158)
- The Whole of Government Accounts (Designation of Bodies) Order (Northern Ireland) 2010 (S.R. 2010 No. 159)
- The Carriage of Dangerous Goods and Use of Transportable Pressure Equipment Regulations (Northern Ireland) 2010 (S.R. 2010 No. 160)
- The Common Agricultural Policy Single Payment and Support Schemes Regulations (Northern Ireland) 2010 (S.R. 2010 No. 161)
- The Gangmasters Licensing (Exclusions) Regulations (Northern Ireland) 2010 (S.R. 2010 No. 162)
- The Biocidal Products (Amendment) Regulations (Northern Ireland) 2010 (S.R. 2010 No. 163)
- Local Government Pension Scheme (Amendment) Regulations (Northern Ireland) 2010 (S.R. 2010 No. 164)
- The Solvent Emissions (Amendment) Regulations (Northern Ireland) 2010 (S.R. 2010 No. 165)
- Eel Fishing Regulations (Northern Ireland) 2010 (S.R. 2010 No. 166)
- Eel Fishing (Licence Duties) Regulations (Northern Ireland) 2010 (S.R. 2010 No. 167)
- The Sea Fishing (Enforcement of Community Control Measures) (Amendment) Order (Northern Ireland) 2010 (S.R. 2010 No. 168)
- The Petroleum Production (Amendment) Regulations (Northern Ireland) 2010 (S.R. 2010 No. 169)
- The Hydrocarbons Licensing Directive Regulations (Northern Ireland) 2010 (S.R. 2010 No. 170)
- The Bus Lane (Shankill Road, Belfast) Order (Northern Ireland) 2010 (S.R. 2010 No. 171)
- The Road Races (Gortin Hill Climb) Order (Northern Ireland) 2010 (S.R. 2010 No. 172)
- The Motorway M1 and Westlink A12 (Speed Limits and Variable Speed Limits) Order (Northern Ireland) 2010 (S.R. 2010 No. 173)
- The Common Agricultural Policy Single Payment and Support Schemes (Cross Compliance) (Amendment) Regulations (Northern Ireland) 2010 (S.R. 2010 No. 174)
- The Road Races (Mid-Antrim 150) Order (Northern Ireland) 2010 (S.R. 2010 No. 175)
- The Biosecurity Guidance (Specification of Brucellosis) Order (Northern Ireland) 2010 (S.R. 2010 No. 176)
- The College Park/College Park East, Belfast (Abandonment) Order (Northern Ireland) 2010 (S.R. 2010 No. 177)
- The Road Races (Mourne Rally) Order (Northern Ireland) 2010 (S.R. 2010 No. 178)
- The Motor Vehicles (Construction and Use) (Amendment) Regulations (Northern Ireland) 2010 (S.R. 2010 No. 179)
- The Control of Artificial Optical Radiation at Work Regulations (Northern Ireland) 2010 (S.R. 2010 No. 180)
- The Motor Vehicles (Construction and Use) (Amendment No. 2) Regulations (Northern Ireland) 2010 (S.R. 2010 No. 181)
- The Taxis (Londonderry) Order (Northern Ireland) 2010 (S.R. 2010 No. 182)
- The Penalty Charges (Exemption from Criminal Proceedings) (Amendment) Regulations (Northern Ireland) 2010 (S.R. 2010 No. 183)
- The Companies (Disqualification Orders) Regulations (Northern Ireland) 2010 (S.R. 2010 No. 184)
- The Social Fund Winter Fuel Payment (Temporary Increase) Regulations (Northern Ireland) 2010 (S.R. 2010 No. 185)
- The Employers’ Duties (Registration and Compliance) Regulations (Northern Ireland) 2010 (S.R. 2010 No. 186)
- The Control of Asbestos (Amendment) Regulations (Northern Ireland) 2010 (S.R. 2010 No. 187)
- The Air Quality Standards Regulations (Northern Ireland) 2010 (S.R. 2010 No. 188)
- The Road Races (Ulster Rally) Order (Northern Ireland) 2010 (S.R. 2010 No. 189)
- The Road Races (Craigantlet Hill Climb) Order (Northern Ireland) 2010 (S.R. 2010 No. 190)
- The Road Races (Ulster Grand Prix Bike Week) Order (Northern Ireland) 2010 (S.R. 2010 No. 191)
- The Road Races (Bush, Dungannon) Order (Northern Ireland) 2010 (S.R. 2010 No. 192)
- The Public Service Vehicles (Conditions of Fitness, Equipment and Use) (Amendment) Regulations (Northern Ireland) 2010 (S.R. 2010 No. 193)
- The Rate Relief (Amendment) Regulations (Northern Ireland) 2010 (S.R. 2010 No. 194)
- The Census Order (Northern Ireland) 2010 (S.R. 2010 No. 195)
- Fisheries (Amendment) Regulations (Northern Ireland) 2010 (S.R. 2010 No. 196)
- The Plant Health (Amendment) Order (Northern Ireland) 2010 (S.R. 2010 No. 197)
- The Marketing of Fresh Horticulture Produce Regulations (Northern Ireland) 2010 (S.R. 2010 No. 198)
- The Foyle Area (Control of Fishing) Regulations 2010 (S.R. 2010 No. 199)
- The Social Security (Miscellaneous Amendments No. 4) Regulations (Northern Ireland) 2010 (S.R. 2010 No. 200)

== 201-300 ==
- The Travelling Expenses and Remission of Charges (Amendment) Regulations (Northern Ireland) 2010 (S.R. 2010 No. 201)
- The Prohibition of Traffic (Drumbeg, Craigavon) Order (Northern Ireland) 2010 (S.R. 2010 No. 202)
- The Weights and Measures (Specified Quantities) (Pre-packed Products) Regulations (Northern Ireland) 2010 (S.R. 2010 No. 203)
- The Waiting Restrictions (Newtownards) (Amendment) Order (Northern Ireland) 2010 (S.R. 2010 No. 204)
- The Prohibition of Right-Hand Turn (Newtownards) Order (Northern Ireland) 2010 (S.R. 2010 No. 205)
- The Waiting Restrictions (Lurgan) Order (Northern Ireland) 2010 (S.R. 2010 No. 206)
- The Roads (Speed Limit) (No. 2) Order (Northern Ireland) 2010 (S.R. 2010 No. 207)
- The Waiting Restrictions (Newcastle) (Amendment) Order (Northern Ireland) 2010 (S.R. 2010 No. 208)
- The Waiting Restrictions (Dungannon) Order (Northern Ireland) 2010 (S.R. 2010 No. 209)
- The One-Way Traffic (Lisbellaw) Order (Northern Ireland) 2010 (S.R. 2010 No. 210)
- The Waiting Restrictions (Newry) (Amendment) Order (Northern Ireland) 2010 (S.R. 2010 No. 211)
- The Personal Accounts Delivery Authority Winding Up (Consequential Provisions) Order (Northern Ireland) 2010 (S.R. 2010 No. 212)
- The Roads (Speed Limit) (No. 3) Order (Northern Ireland) 2010 (S.R. 2010 No. 213)
- The Rice Products from the United States of America (Restriction on First Placing on the Market) (Revocation) Regulations (Northern Ireland) 2010 (S.R. 2010 No. 214)
- The Shore Road, Belfast (Abandonment) Order (Northern Ireland) 2010 (S.R. 2010 No. 215)
- The Water and Sewerage Services (2006 Order) (Commencement No. 3) Order (Northern Ireland) 2010 (S.R. 2010 No. 216 (C. 12))
- Biomass Processing Challenge Fund Regulations (Northern Ireland) 2010 (S.R. 2010 No. 217)
- The Census Regulations (Northern Ireland) 2010 (S.R. 2010 No. 218)
- The Industrial Training Levy (Construction Industry) Order (Northern Ireland) 2010 (S.R. 2010 No. 219)
- The Common Agricultural Policy Support Schemes (Review of Decisions) Regulations (Northern Ireland) 2010 (S.R. 2010 No. 220)
- The Flexible Working (Eligibility, Complaints and Remedies) (Amendment) Regulations (Northern Ireland) 2010 (S.R. 2010 No. 221)
- The Medical Profession (Responsible Officers) Regulations (Northern Ireland) 2010 (S.R. 2010 No. 222)
- The Road Races (Eagles Rock Hill Climb) Order (Northern Ireland) 2010 (S.R. 2010 No. 223)
- The Road Races (Spelga Hill Climb) Order (Northern Ireland) 2010 (S.R. 2010 No. 224)
- The Road Races (Armoy Motorcycle Race) Order (Northern Ireland) 2010 (S.R. 2010 No. 225)
- The Road Traffic (2007 Order) (Commencement No. 5) Order (Northern Ireland) 2010 (S.R. 2010 No. 226 (C. 13))
- The Motor Vehicles (Driving Instruction) Regulations (Northern Ireland) 2010 (S.R. 2010 No. 227)
- The Motor Vehicles (Driving Instruction) (Trainee Licence) Regulations (Northern Ireland) 2010 (S.R. 2010 No. 228)
- The Police Act 1997 (Criminal Records) (Disclosure) (Amendment) Regulations (Northern Ireland) 2010 (S.R. 2010 No. 229)
- Agriculture (Student fees) (Amendment) Regulations (Northern Ireland) 2010 (S.R. 2010 No. 230)
- The Beef and Pig Carcase Classification Regulations (Northern Ireland) 2010 (S.R. 2010 No. 231)
- The Plant Health (Amendment No. 2) Order (Northern Ireland) 2010 (S.R. 2010 No. 232)
- The Industrial Training (Construction Board) (Amendment) Order (Northern Ireland) 2010 (S.R. 2010 No. 233)
- The Further Education (Student Support) (Eligibility) Regulations (Northern Ireland) 2010 (S.R. 2010 No. 234)
- The Road Races (Garron Point Hill Climb) Order (Northern Ireland) 2010 (S.R. 2010 No. 235)
- The Waiting Restrictions (Moira) Order (Northern Ireland) 2010 (S.R. 2010 No. 236)
- The Waiting Restrictions (Banbridge) Order (Northern Ireland) 2010 (S.R. 2010 No. 237)
- The Extinguishment of Right to Use Vehicles on Roads (Belfast) (Amendment) Order (Northern Ireland) 2010 (S.R. 2010 No. 238)
- The Parking Places on Roads (Coaches) (Amendment) Order (Northern Ireland) 2010 (S.R. 2010 No. 239)
- The Parking Places on Roads (Newry) (Amendment) Order (Northern Ireland) 2010 (S.R. 2010 No. 240)
- The Airfield Road Lower, Donnybrewer (Abandonment) Order (Northern Ireland) 2010 (S.R. 2010 No. 241)
- The Devonshire Way, Belfast (Abandonment) Order (Northern Ireland) 2010 (S.R. 2010 No. 242)
- The Glensharragh Park, Castlereagh (Abandonment) Order (Northern Ireland) 2010 (S.R. 2010 No. 243)
- The Seahill Road, Holywood (Abandonment) Order (Northern Ireland) 2010 (S.R. 2010 No. 244)
- The Access Road to the Giants Causeway, Bushmills (Abandonment) Order (Northern Ireland) 2010 (S.R. 2010 No. 245)
- The Misuse of Drugs (Designation) (Amendment No.2) Order (Northern Ireland) 2010 (S.R. 2010 No. 246)
- The Misuse of Drugs (Amendment No.2) Regulations (Northern Ireland) 2010 (S.R. 2010 No. 247)
- The Control of Salmonella in Turkey Flocks Scheme Order (Northern Ireland) 2010 (S.R. 2010 No. 248)
- The Occupational Pension Schemes (Levies) (Amendment) Regulations (Northern Ireland) 2010 (S.R. 2010 No. 249)
- The Pensions Regulator (Contribution Notices) (Sum Specified Following Transfer) Regulations (Northern Ireland) 2010 (S.R. 2010 No. 250)
- The Housing (Amendment) (2010 Act) (Commencement) Order (Northern Ireland) 2010 (S.R. 2010 No. 251 (C. 14))
- The Local Government (Provision of Services) Regulations (Northern Ireland) 2010 (S.R. 2010 No. 252)
- The Zoonoses and Animal By-Products (Fees) (Amendment) Regulations (Northern Ireland) 2010 (S.R. 2010 No. 253)
- The Depot Road, Belfast (Abandonment) Order (Northern Ireland) 2010 (S.R. 2010 No. 254)
- The Park Drive/Hamilton Road, Bangor (Abandonment) Order (Northern Ireland) 2010 (S.R. 2010 No. 255)
- The Waiting Restrictions (Londonderry) Order (Northern Ireland) 2010 (S.R. 2010 No. 256)
- The Waiting Restrictions (Newry) (Amendment No. 2) Order (Northern Ireland) 2010 (S.R. 2010 No. 257)
- The Parking Places (Disabled Persons’ Vehicles) (Amendment) Order (Northern Ireland) 2010 (S.R. 2010 No. 258)
- The Nutrition and Health Claims (Amendment) Regulations (Northern Ireland) 2010 (S.R. 2010 No. 259)
- The Moy Road (Route A29) and Drumcairn Road, Armagh (Abandonment) Order (Northern Ireland) 2010 (S.R. 2010 No. 260)
- The Waiting Restrictions (Omagh) Order (Northern Ireland) 2010 (S.R. 2010 No. 261)
- The Clearway (Ballymena) Order (Northern Ireland) 2010 (S.R. 2010 No. 262)
- The Prohibition of Traffic (Juniper Way, Twinbrook) Order (Northern Ireland) 2010 (S.R. 2010 No. 263)
- The Waiting Restrictions (Dungannon) (Amendment) Order (Northern Ireland) 2010 (S.R. 2010 No. 264)
- The Parking Places on Roads (Strabane) (Amendment) Order (Northern Ireland) 2010 (S.R. 2010 No. 265)
- The Parking and Waiting Restrictions (Ballymoney) (Amendment) Order (Northern Ireland) 2010 (S.R. 2010 No. 266)
- The Taxis (Portstewart) Order (Northern Ireland) 2010 (S.R. 2010 No. 267)
- The Parking Places on Roads (Motor Cycles) Order (Northern Ireland) 2010 (S.R. 2010 No. 268)
- The St. Julian's Way, Omagh (Footpath) (Abandonment) Order (Northern Ireland) 2010 (S.R. 2010 No. 269)
- The Parking Places on Roads (Bushmills) Order (Northern Ireland) 2010 (S.R. 2010 No. 270)
- The Parking Places on Roads (Keady) Order (Northern Ireland) 2010 (S.R. 2010 No. 271)
- The Loading Bays and Parking Places on Roads (Amendment) Order (Northern Ireland) 2010 (S.R. 2010 No. 273)
- The Parking Places on Roads (Lisburn) Order (Northern Ireland) 2010 (S.R. 2010 No. 274)
- The Parking Places on Roads (Kesh) Order (Northern Ireland) 2010 (S.R. 2010 No. 275)
- The Bus Lane (Crumlin Road, Belfast) Order (Northern Ireland) 2010 (S.R. 2010 No. 276)
- The Parking and Waiting Restrictions (Ballymena) (Amendment) Order (Northern Ireland) 2010 (S.R. 2010 No. 277)
- The One-Way Traffic (Ballymoney) (Amendment) Order (Northern Ireland) 2010 (S.R. 2010 No. 278)
- The Loading Bays and Parking Places on Roads (Amendment No. 2) Order (Northern Ireland) 2010 (S.R. 2010 No. 279)
- The Waiting Restrictions (Rasharkin) Order (Northern Ireland) 2010 (S.R. 2010 No. 280)
- The Fulton Street, Belfast (Footway) (Abandonment) Order Northern Ireland 2010 (S.R. 2010 No. 281)
- The Parking and Waiting Restrictions (Portrush) (Amendment) Order (Northern Ireland) 2010 (S.R. 2010 No. 282)
- The Parking and Waiting Restrictions (Crumlin) Order (Northern Ireland) 2010 (S.R. 2010 No. 283)
- The Parking Places, Loading Bay and Waiting Restrictions (Portstewart) Order (Northern Ireland) 2010 (S.R. 2010 No. 284)
- Registered Rents (Increase) Order (Northern Ireland) 2010 (S.R. 2010 No. 285)
- The Health and Personal Social Services (Superannuation Scheme, Injury Benefits and Additional Voluntary Contributions), Health and Social Care (Pension Scheme) (Amendment) Regulations (Northern Ireland) 2010 (S.R. 2010 No. 286)
- The Occupational Pension Schemes (Investment) (Amendment) Regulations (Northern Ireland) 2010 (S.R. 2010 No. 287)
- The Health and Personal Social Services (Quality, Improvement and Regulation) (2003 Order) (Commencement No.5 and Transitional Provisions) Order (Northern Ireland) 2010 (S.R. 2010 No. 288 (C. 15))
- The Voluntary Adoption Agencies Regulations (Northern Ireland) 2010 (S.R. 2010 No. 289)
- The Regulation and Quality Improvement Authority (Registration) (Amendment) Regulations (Northern Ireland) 2010 (S.R. 2010 No. 290)
- The Regulation and Quality Improvement Authority (Fees and Frequency of Inspections) (Amendment) Regulations (Northern Ireland) 2010 (S.R. 2010 No. 291)
- The Addition of Vitamins, Minerals and Other Substances (Amendment) Regulations (Northern Ireland) 2010 (S.R. 2010 No. 292)
- The Trunk Road T8 (A31) (Magherafelt Bypass) Order (Northern Ireland) 2010 (S.R. 2010 No. 293)
- The Planning (Fees) (Amendment) Regulations (Northern Ireland) 2010 (S.R. 2010 No. 294)
- The Work and Families (Northern Ireland) Order 2006 (Commencement No. 2) Order (Northern Ireland) 2010 (S.R. 2010 No. 295 (C. 16))
- The Additional Paternity Leave (Adoptions from Overseas) Regulations (Northern Ireland) 2010 (S.R. 2010 No. 296)
- The Additional Paternity Leave Regulations (Northern Ireland) 2010 (S.R. 2010 No. 297)
- The Additional Statutory Paternity Pay (Adoptions from Overseas) Regulations (Northern Ireland) 2010 (S.R. 2010 No. 298)
- The Additional Statutory Paternity Pay (Birth, Adoption and Adoptions from Overseas) (Administration) Regulations (Northern Ireland) 2010 (S.R. 2010 No. 299)
- The Additional Statutory Paternity Pay (General) Regulations (Northern Ireland) 2010 (S.R. 2010 No. 300)

== 301-400 ==
- The Additional Statutory Paternity Pay (Health and Social Care Employees) Regulations (Northern Ireland) 2010 (S.R. 2010 No. 301)
- The Additional Statutory Paternity Pay (Weekly Rates) Regulations (Northern Ireland) 2010 (S.R. 2010 No. 302)
- The Employment Rights (Northern Ireland) Order 1996 (Application of Article 112BB to Adoptions from Overseas) Regulations (Northern Ireland) 2010 (S.R. 2010 No. 303)
- The Ordinary Statutory Paternity Pay (Adoption), Additional Statutory Paternity Pay (Adoption) and Statutory Adoption Pay (Adoptions from Overseas) (Persons Abroad and Mariners) Regulations (Northern Ireland) 2010 (S.R. 2010 No. 304)
- The Social Security Contributions and Benefits (Northern Ireland) Act 1992 (Application of Parts 12ZA and 12ZB to Adoptions from Overseas) Regulations (Northern Ireland) 2003 (Amendment) Regulations (Northern Ireland) 2010 (S.R. 2010 No. 305)
- The Statutory Paternity Pay and Statutory Adoption Pay (Persons Abroad and Mariners) Regulations (Northern Ireland) 2002 (Amendment) Regulations (Northern Ireland) 2010 (S.R. 2010 No. 306)
- The Plant Health (Amendment No. 3) Order (Northern Ireland) 2010 (S.R. 2010 No. 307)
- The Welfare Reform (2007 Act) (Commencement No. 8) Order (Northern Ireland) 2010 (S.R. 2010 No. 308 (C. 17))
- The Forestry (2010 Act) (Commencement No. 1) Order (Northern Ireland) 2010 (S.R. 2010 No. 309 (C. 18))
- The Foyle Area (Licensing of Oyster Fishing) (Amendment) Regulations 2010 (S.R. 2010 No. 310)
- The Social Security (Miscellaneous Amendments No. 5) Regulations (Northern Ireland) 2010 (S.R. 2010 No. 311)
- The Employment and Support Allowance (Transitional Provisions and Housing Benefit) (Existing Awards) Regulations (Northern Ireland) 2010 (S.R. 2010 No. 312)
- The Roads (Speed Limit) (No. 4) Order (Northern Ireland) 2010 (S.R. 2010 No. 313)
- The Loading Bays and Parking Places on Roads (Amendment No. 3) Order (Northern Ireland) 2010 (S.R. 2010 No. 314)
- The Waiting Restrictions (Holywood) Order (Northern Ireland) 2010 (S.R. 2010 No. 315)
- The Back Streets at Alliance Drive and Alliance Gardens, Belfast (Abandonment) Order (Northern Ireland) 2010 (S.R. 2010 No. 316)
- The Glebe Road, Annahilt (Abandonment) Order (Northern Ireland) 2010 (S.R. 2010 No. 317)
- The Northwood, Lurgan (Footway) (Abandonment) Order (Northern Ireland) 2010 (S.R. 2010 No. 318)
- The Bank Parade, Newry (Abandonment) Order (Northern Ireland) 2010 (S.R. 2010 No. 319)
- The Belfast Road (A3), Dollingstown (Abandonment) Order (Northern Ireland) 2010 (S.R. 2010 No. 320)
- The Materials and Articles in Contact with Food Regulations (Northern Ireland) 2010 (S.R. 2010 No. 321)
- The Food Irradiation (Amendment) Regulations (Northern Ireland) 2010 (S.R. 2010 No. 322)
- The Feed (Sampling and Analysis and Specified Undesirable Substances) Regulations (Northern Ireland) 2010 (S.R. 2010 No. 323)
- The Rates (Unoccupied Property) (Prescribed Information) Regulations (Northern Ireland) 2010 (S.R. 2010 No. 324)
- The Fire Safety Regulations (Northern Ireland) 2010 (S.R. 2010 No. 325)
- Gas (Applications for Licences and Extensions) (Amendment) Regulations (Northern Ireland) 2010 (S.R. 2010 No. 326)
- The Welfare Reform (2010 Act) (Commencement No. 1 and Transitory Provision) Order (Northern Ireland) 2010 (S.R. 2010 No. 327 (C. 19))
- The Fire and Rescue Services (2006 Order) (Commencement No. 2) Order (Northern Ireland) 2010 (S.R. 2010 No. 328 (C. 20))
- The Planning (Hazardous Substances) (Amendment) Regulations (Northern Ireland) 2010 (S.R. 2010 No. 329)
- The Waiting Restrictions (Bangor) Order (Northern Ireland) 2010 (S.R. 2010 No. 330)
- The Bog Road, Ballygowan (Abandonment) Order (Northern Ireland) 2010 (S.R. 2010 No. 331)
- The Social Security (Disability Living Allowance) (Amendment) Regulations (Northern Ireland) 2010 (S.R. 2010 No. 332)
- The Bus Lanes Order (Amendment) Order (Northern Ireland) 2010 (S.R. 2010 No. 333)
- The Parking and Waiting Restrictions (Armagh) (Amendment) Order (Northern Ireland) 2010 (S.R. 2010 No. 334)
- The Contaminants in Food Regulations (Northern Ireland) 2010 (S.R. 2010 No. 335)
- Safeguarding Vulnerable Groups (Barred Lists: Scotland) Order (Northern Ireland) 2010 (S.R. 2010 No. 336)
- The Social Security (Claims and Payments) (Amendment No. 2) Regulations (Northern Ireland) 2010 (S.R. 2010 No. 337)
- The Foodstuffs Suitable for People Intolerant to Gluten Regulations (Northern Ireland) 2010 (S.R. 2010 No. 338)
- The Welfare of Farmed Animals (Amendment) Regulations (Northern Ireland) 2010 (S.R. 2010 No. 339)
- The Social Security (Housing Costs) (Standard Interest Rate) (Amendment) Regulations (Northern Ireland) 2010 (S.R. 2010 No. 340)
- The Welfare Reform (2010 Act) (Commencement No. 2) Order (Northern Ireland) 2010 (S.R. 2010 No. 341 (C. 21))
- The Sunninghill Gardens, Belfast (Stopping-Up) Order (Northern Ireland) 2010 (S.R. 2010 No. 342)
- The Genetically Modified Organisms (Contained Use) (Amendment) Regulations (Northern Ireland) 2010 (S.R. 2010 No. 343)
- The Social Fund (Cold Weather Payments) (General) (Amendment) Regulations (Northern Ireland) 2010 (S.R. 2010 No. 344)
- The Social Security (Miscellaneous Amendments No. 6) Regulations (Northern Ireland) 2010 (S.R. 2010 No. 345)
- The Social Security (Contribution Conditions for Jobseeker's Allowance and Employment and Support Allowance) Regulations (Northern Ireland) 2010 (S.R. 2010 No. 346)
- The Employment and Support Allowance (Transitional Provisions and Housing Benefit) (Existing Awards) (Amendment) Regulations (Northern Ireland) 2010 (S.R. 2010 No. 347)
- The Police Pension (Amendment) Regulations (Northern Ireland) 2010 (S.R. 2010 No. 348)
- Criminal Justice and Immigration (2008 Act) (Commencement No.2) Order (Northern Ireland) 2010 (S.R. 2010 No. 349 (C. 22))
- The Seed Potatoes Regulations (Northern Ireland) 2010 (S.R. 2010 No. 350)
- The Social Fund (Cold Weather Payments) (General) (Amendment No. 2) Regulations (Northern Ireland) 2010 (S.R. 2010 No. 351)
- The Travelling Expenses and Remission of Charges (Amendment No. 2) Regulations (Northern Ireland) 2010 (S.R. 2010 No. 352)
- The Introductory Tenancies (Abandonment Notice) Regulations (Northern Ireland) 2010 (S.R. 2010 No. 353)
- The Introductory Tenancies (Abandoned Property) Order (Northern Ireland) 2010 (S.R. 2010 No. 354)
- The Animal Feed Regulations (Northern Ireland) 2010 (S.R. 2010 No. 355)
- The Parking Places on Roads (Disabled Persons’ Vehicles) (Amendment) Order (Northern Ireland) 2010 (S.R. 2010 No. 356)
- The Roads (Speed Limit) (No. 5) Order (Northern Ireland) 2010 (S.R. 2010 No. 357)
- The Parking Places on Roads (Cookstown) Order (Northern Ireland) 2010 (S.R. 2010 No. 358)
- The Prohibition of Waiting (Amendment) Order (Northern Ireland) 2010 (S.R. 2010 No. 359)
- The Conduct of Employment Agencies and Employment Businesses (Amendment) Regulations (Northern Ireland) 2010 (S.R. 2010 No. 360)
- Public Interest Disclosure (Prescribed Persons) (Amendment) Order (Northern Ireland) 2010 (S.R. 2010 No. 361)
- The Departments (Transfer of Functions) Order (Northern Ireland) 2010 (S.R. 2010 No. 362)
- The Cycle Racing on Roads (Amendment) Regulations (Northern Ireland) 2010 (S.R. 2010 No. 363)
- The Lower Braniel Road, Castlereagh (Abandonment) Order (Northern Ireland) 2010 (S.R. 2010 No. 364)
- The Units of Measurement Regulations (Northern Ireland) 2010 (S.R. 2010 No. 365)
- The Weights and Measures (Metrication Amendments) Regulations (Northern Ireland) 2010 (S.R. 2010 No. 366)
- The Motor Vehicles (Driving Instruction) (Amendment) Regulations (Northern Ireland) 2010 (S.R. 2010 No. 367)
- The Prohibition of Right-Hand Turn (Belfast) Order (Northern Ireland) 2010 (S.R. 2010 No. 368)
- The Smoke Control Areas (Exempted Fireplaces) Regulations (Northern Ireland) 2010 (S.R. 2010 No. 369)
- The Road Traffic (2007 Order) (Commencement No. 6) Order (Northern Ireland) 2010 (S.R. 2010 No. 370 (C. 23))
- The Road Traffic Fixed Penalty (Procedure) (Amendment) Regulations (Northern Ireland) 2010 (S.R. 2010 No. 371)
- The Road Traffic Fixed Penalty (Procedure) (Vehicle Examiners) Regulations (Northern Ireland) 2010 (S.R. 2010 No. 372)
- The Occupational, Personal and Stakeholder Pension Schemes (Disclosure of Information) (Amendment) Regulations (Northern Ireland) 2010 (S.R. 2010 No. 373)
- Electricity (Guarantees of Origin of Electricity Produced from Renewable Energy Sources) (Amendment) Regulations (Northern Ireland) 2010 (S.R. 2010 No. 374)
- The Health and Personal Social Services (General Medical Services Contracts) (Prescription of Drugs Etc.) (Amendment) Regulations (Northern Ireland) 2010 (S.R. 2010 No. 375)
- The Health and Personal Social Services (Primary Medical Services Performers Lists) (Amendment) Regulations (Northern Ireland) 2010 (S.R. 2010 No. 376)
- Police Service of Northern Ireland and Police Service of Northern Ireland Reserve (Full-Time) (Severance) (Amendment) Regulations 2010 (S.R. 2010 No. 377)
- The Social Fund Maternity and Funeral Expenses (General) (Amendment) Regulations (Northern Ireland) 2010 (S.R. 2010 No. 378)
- The Family Proceedings (Amendment) Rules (Northern Ireland) 2010 (S.R. 2010 No. 379)
- The Animals and Animal Products (Import and Export) (Amendment) Regulations (Northern Ireland) 2010 (S.R. 2010 No. 380)
- The Rules of the Court of Judicature (Northern Ireland) (Amendment No. 2) 2010 (S.R. 2010 No. 381)
- The Building (Amendment No. 2) Regulations (Northern Ireland) 2010 (S.R. 2010 No. 382)
- The Education (Student Support) (No. 2) Regulations (Northern Ireland) 2009 (Amendment) Regulations (Northern Ireland) 2010 (S.R. 2010 No. 383)
- The Plant Health (Import Inspection Fees) (Amendment) Regulations (Northern Ireland) 2010 (S.R. 2010 No. 384)
- The Parking and Waiting Restrictions (Omagh) Order (Northern Ireland) 2010 (S.R. 2010 No. 385)
- The One-Way Traffic (Downpatrick) Order (Northern Ireland) 2010 (S.R. 2010 No. 386)
- The Prohibition of Right-Hand Turn (Newry) Order (Northern Ireland) 2010 (S.R. 2010 No. 387)
- The Cycle Tracks (A50 Castlewellan Road, Newcastle) Order (Northern Ireland) 2010 (S.R. 2010 No. 388)
- The Parking and Waiting Restrictions (Ballymoney) (Amendment No. 2) Order (Northern Ireland) 2010 (S.R. 2010 No. 389)
- The Parking Places on Roads (Lisburn) (No. 2) Order (Northern Ireland) 2010 (S.R. 2010 No. 390)
- The Parking and Waiting Restrictions (Ballymena) (Amendment No. 2) Order (Northern Ireland) 2010 (S.R. 2010 No. 391)
- The Waiting Restrictions (Lurgan) (No. 2) Order (Northern Ireland) 2010 (S.R. 2010 No. 392)
- The Parking and Waiting Restrictions (Omagh) (No. 2) Order (Northern Ireland) 2010 (S.R. 2010 No. 393)
- The Bee Diseases and Pests Control (Amendment) Order (Northern Ireland) 2010 (S.R. 2010 No. 394)
- The Education (School Development Plans) Regulations (Northern Ireland) 2010 (S.R. 2010 No. 395)
- The Producer Responsibility Obligations (Packaging Waste) (Amendment) Regulations (Northern Ireland) 2010 (S.R. 2010 No. 396)
- The Pennyburn Industrial Estate Service Road, Londonderry (Abandonment) Order (Northern Ireland) 2010 (S.R. 2010 No. 397)
- Public Interest Disclosure (Prescribed Persons) (Amendment No.2) Order (Northern Ireland) 2010 (S.R. 2010 No. 399)
- The Cycle Routes (Amendment) Order (Northern Ireland) 2010 (S.R. 2010 No. 400)

== 401-500 ==
- The Taxis (Lisburn) Order (Northern Ireland) 2010 (S.R. 2010 No. 401)
- The One-Way Traffic (Portglenone) Order (Northern Ireland) 2010 (S.R. 2010 No. 402)
- The Cascum Lane (U4466), Banbridge (Abandonment) Order (Northern Ireland) 2010 (S.R. 2010 No. 403)
- The Medicines (Pharmacies) (Applications for Registration and Fees) Regulations (Northern Ireland) 2010 (S.R. 2010 No. 404)
- The Homelessness (Review) Regulations (Northern Ireland) 2010 (S.R. 2010 No. 405)
- The Transmissible Spongiform Encephalopathies Regulations (Northern Ireland) 2010 (S.R. 2010 No. 406)
- The Rate of Bereavement Benefits Regulations (Northern Ireland) 2010 (S.R. 2010 No. 407)
- The Wild Birds (Special Protection) (No.2) (Northern Ireland) Order 2010 (S.R. 2010 No. 408)
- General Register Office (Fees) Order (Northern Ireland) 2010 (S.R. 2010 No. 409)
- Local Government Pension Scheme (Amendment No. 2) Regulations (Northern Ireland) 2010 (S.R. 2010 No. 410)
- The Nitrates Action Programme Regulations (Northern Ireland) 2010 (S.R. 2010 No. 411)
- Control of Pollution (Oil Storage) Regulations (Northern Ireland) 2010 (S.R. 2010 No. 412)
- The Occupational Pensions (Revaluation) Order (Northern Ireland) 2010 (S.R. 2010 No. 413)
- The Flavourings in Food Regulations (Northern Ireland) 2010 (S.R. 2010 No. 414)
- The Street Works (Inspection Fees) (Amendment) Regulations (Northern Ireland) 2010 (S.R. 2010 No. 415)
- The Child Maintenance (2008 Act) (Commencement No. 8) Order (Northern Ireland) 2010 (S.R. 2010 No. 416 (C. 24))
- The Products of Animal Origin (Third Country Imports) (Amendment) Regulations (Northern Ireland) 2010 (S.R. 2010 No. 417)
- The Less Favoured Area Compensatory Allowances (No. 2) Regulations (Northern Ireland) 2010 (S.R. 2010 No. 418)
- Level Crossing (Lissue) Order (Northern Ireland) 2010 (S.R. 2010 No. 419)
- The Health and Personal Social Services (Superannuation), Health and Social Care (Pension Scheme) (Amendment) Regulations (Northern Ireland) 2010 (S.R. 2010 No. 420)
- Police Service of Northern Ireland Pensions (Additional Voluntary Contributions) (Amendment) Regulations 2010 (S.R. 2010 No. 421)
- The Home Repair Assistance Grant (Amendment) Regulations (Northern Ireland) 2010 (S.R. 2010 No. 422)
- The Roads (Speed Limit) (No. 6) Order (Northern Ireland) 2010 (S.R. 2010 No. 423)
- The Control of Traffic (Joy Street, Belfast) Order (Northern Ireland) 2010 (S.R. 2010 No. 424)
- The Control of Traffic (Belfast) Order (Northern Ireland) 2010 (S.R. 2010 No. 425)
- The Wild Birds (Special Protection) (No.3) (Northern Ireland) Order 2010 (S.R. 2010 No. 426)
- The Loading Bays and Parking Places on Roads (Amendment No. 4) Order (Northern Ireland) 2010 (S.R. 2010 No. 427)
- The Waiting Restrictions (Newry) (Amendment No. 3) Order (Northern Ireland) 2010 (S.R. 2010 No. 428)
- The Redpoll Avenue, Lisburn (Footpaths) (Abandonment) Order (Northern Ireland) 2010 (S.R. 2010 No. 429)
- The Rules of the Court of Judicature (Northern Ireland) (Amendment No.3) 2010 (S.R. 2010 No. 430)
- Valuation (Telecommunications, Natural Gas and Water) Regulations (Northern Ireland) 2010 (S.R. 2010 No. 431)
- The Clearway (Route A5, Bradley Way, Strabane) Order (Northern Ireland) 2010 (S.R. 2010 No. 432)
- The Roads (Speed Limit) (No. 7) Order (Northern Ireland) 2010 (S.R. 2010 No. 433)
- The Wild Birds (Special Protection) (No.3) (Revocation) (Northern Ireland) Order 2010 (S.R. 2010 No. 434)
- The Parking Places (Disabled Persons' Vehicles) (Amendment No. 2) Order (Northern Ireland) 2010 (S.R. 2010 No. 435)
