= List of statutory rules of Northern Ireland, 1995 =

This is an incomplete list of statutory rules of Northern Ireland in 1995.

== 1-100 ==
- Students Awards Regulations (Northern Ireland) 1995 (S.R. 1995 No. 1)
- Urban Waste Water Treatment Regulations (Northern Ireland) 1995 (S.R. 1995 No. 12)
- Social Security (Incapacity Benefit) (Transitional) Regulations (Northern Ireland) 1995 (S.R. 1995 No. 35)
- Social Security (Incapacity for Work) (General) Regulations (Northern Ireland) 1995 (S.R. 1995 No. 41)
- Disability Working Allowance and Income Support (General) (Amendment) Regulations (Northern Ireland) 1995 (S.R. 1995 No. 67)
- Statutory Sick Pay Percentage Threshold Order (Northern Ireland) 1995 (S.R. 1995 No. 69)
- Social Security Benefits Up-rating Order (Northern Ireland) 1995 (S.R. 1995 No. 71)
- Social Security Benefits Up-rating Regulations (Northern Ireland) 1995 (S.R. 1995 No. 72)
- Social Security (Industrial Injuries) (Dependency) (Permitted Earnings Limits) Order (Northern Ireland) 1995 (S.R. 1995 No. 73)
- Social Security (Contributions) (Re-rating and Northern Ireland National Insurance Fund Payments) Order (Northern Ireland) 1995 (S.R. 1995 No. 79)
- Explosives in Harbour Areas Regulations (Northern Ireland) 1995 (S.R. 1995 No. 87)

== 101-200 ==
- Spirit Drinks (Amendment) Regulations (Northern Ireland) 1995 (S.R. 1995 No. 105)
- Social Security (Reciprocal Agreements) Order (Northern Ireland) 1995 (S.R. 1995 No. 110)
- Companies (1986 Order) (Audit Exemption) Regulations (Northern Ireland) 1995 (S.R. 1995 No. 128)
- Social Security (Incapacity Benefit) (Consequential and Transitional Amendments and Savings) Regulations (Northern Ireland) 1995 (S.R. 1995 No. 150)
- Welfare of Animals (Scheduled Operations) (Amendment) Order (Northern Ireland) 1995 (S.R. 1995 No. 173)

== 201-300 ==
- Units of Measurement Regulations (Northern Ireland) 1995 (S.R. 1995 No. 226)
- Fair Employment Tribunal (Remedies) Order (Northern Ireland) 1995 (S.R. 1995 No. 240)
- Children (1995 Order) (Commencement No. 1) Order (Northern Ireland) 1995 (S.R. 1995 No. 248)
- Social Security (Adjudication) Regulations (Northern Ireland) 1995 (S.R. 1995 No. 293)
- Airports (1994 Order) (Commencement) Order (Northern Ireland) 1995 (S.R. 1995 No. 294)

== 301-400 ==
- Arts Council (1995 Order) (Commencement) Order (Northern Ireland) 1995 (S.R. 1995 No. 304)
- Companies (Fees) Regulations (Northern Ireland) 1995 (S.R. 1995 No. 312)
- Companies (Inspectors' Reports and Records Inspection) (Fees) Regulations (Northern Ireland) 1995 (S.R. 1995 No. 313)
- Offshore Installations and Pipeline Works (Management and Administration) Regulations (Northern Ireland) 1995 (S.R. 1995 No. 340)
- Trade Union and Labour Relations (1995 Order) (Commencement and Transitional Provisions) Order (Northern Ireland) 1995 (S.R. 1995 No. 354)
- Conservation (Natural Habitats, etc.) Regulations (Northern Ireland) 1995 (S.R. 1995 No. 380)
- Eggs (Marketing Standards) Regulations (Northern Ireland) 1995 (S.R. 1995 No. 382)
- Companies (Forms) Regulations (Northern Ireland) 1995 (S.R. 1995 No. 383)
- Judicial Pensions (Preservation of Benefits) Order (Northern Ireland) 1995 (S.R. 1995 No. 388)
- Judicial Pensions (Guaranteed Minimum Pension) Order (Northern Ireland) 1995 (S.R. 1995 No. 389

== 401-500 ==
)

- Social Security (Canada) Order (Northern Ireland) 1995 (S.R. 1995 No. 405)
- Child Support (1995 Order) (Commencement No. 1) Order (Northern Ireland) 1995 (S.R. 1995 No. 428)
- Social Security (Income Support and Adjudication) (Amendment) Regulations (Northern Ireland) 1995 (S.R. 1995 No. 434)
- Occupational Pensions (Revaluation) Order (Northern Ireland) 1995 (S.R. 1995 No. 435)
- Feeding Stuffs Regulations (Northern Ireland) 1995 (S.R. 1995 No. 451)
- Home Energy Conservation Act 1995 (Commencement) Order (Northern Ireland) 1995 (S.R. 1995 No. 455)
- Pensions (1995 Order) (Commencement No. 1) Order (Northern Ireland) 1995 (S.R. 1995 No. 477)
- Social Security (Graduated Retirement Benefit) (Amendment) Regulations (Northern Ireland) 1995 (S.R. 1995 No. 483)
