= List of statutory rules of Northern Ireland, 1986 =

This is an incomplete list of statutory rules of Northern Ireland in 1986.

== 1-100 ==
- Lough Erne (Navigation) (Amendment) Bye-laws (Northern Ireland) 1986 (SR(NI) 1986/1)
- Horned Cattle (Exemptions) Order (Northern Ireland) 1986 (SR(NI) 1986/2)
- Fixed Penalty (Increase) Order (Northern Ireland) 1986 (SR(NI) 1986/3)
- Urban Clearways (Londonderry) Order (Northern Ireland) 1986 (SR(NI) 1986/4)
- One-Way Traffic (Newtownabbey) Order (Northern Ireland) 1986 (SR(NI) 1986/5)
- One-Way Traffic (Belfast) Order (Northern Ireland) 1986 (SR(NI) 1986/6)
- Level Crossing (Cullybackey South) Order (Northern Ireland) 1986 (SR(NI) 1986/7)
- Radioactive Substances (Gaseous Tritium Light Devices) Exemption Order (Northern Ireland) 1986 (SR(NI) 1986/10)
- Misuse of Drugs (Northern Ireland) Regulations 1986 (SR(NI) 1986/52)

== 101-200 ==
- Mental Health Review Tribunal (Northern Ireland) Rules 1986 (SR(NI) 1986/193)

== 201-300 ==
- Companies (Forms) Regulations (Northern Ireland) 1986 (SR(NI) 1986/287)

== 301-400 ==
- Companies (Unregistered Companies) Regulations (Northern Ireland) 1986 (SR(NI) 1986/305)
