= List of statutory rules of Northern Ireland, 1978 =

This is an incomplete list of statutory rules of Northern Ireland in 1978.

- Babies' Dummies (Safety) Regulations (Northern Ireland) 1978 (SR(NI) 1978/322)
