= Statutory rules of Northern Ireland =

The statutory rules of Northern Ireland are the principal form in which delegated legislation is made in Northern Ireland.

Statutory rules are made under the Statutory Rules (Northern Ireland) Order 1979 (SI 1979/1573). They replaced statutory rules and orders made under the Rules Publication Act (Northern Ireland) 1925 (15 & 16 Geo. 5. c. 6 (N.I.)) and are comparable with statutory instruments in the rest of the United Kingdom.

== Definition and making of statutory rules ==
A document is a statutory rule if it contains orders, rules, regulations or byelaws which have effect in Northern Ireland and were made after 31 December 1958 by Northern Ireland departments or certain other public bodies in exercise of a power of a legislative character conferred by:

- an act of the Parliament of Northern Ireland,
- an act of the Northern Ireland Assembly,
- an act of the Parliament of the United Kingdom.

After being made by the relevant public body, statutory rules are registered and numbered (sequentially under the year in which they are made) by the Office of the First Minister and deputy First Minister which then arranges for notice of the making of the rules to be published in the Belfast Gazette and for the rules to be printed by Her Majesty's Stationery Office.

== Controls over statutory rules ==
Many parent acts will require that new statutory rules are laid before the Northern Ireland Assembly and are either:

- subject to affirmative resolution - in other words, they cannot come into force until approved by the Assembly; or
- subject to negative resolution - meaning that they will become law after a period (usually 30 days when the Assembly is sitting) unless the Assembly passes a resolution to annul them.

Every statutory rule which is laid before the Assembly and which is subject to proceedings in the Assembly is referred to the appropriate committee of the Assembly for consideration. To assist the committees, the Northern Ireland Assembly has appointed an Examiner of Statutory Rules. The Committee or Examiner will highlight a rule to the Assembly if it:

- imposes a cost on the public finances,
- requires payments of fees to a public authority,
- is made under powers which prevent it from be challenged in the courts,
- attempts to have retrospective effect (i.e. to change the law from a date before the date on which it is made) when the parent legislation does not explicitly empower it to do so,
- makes an unexpected or unusual use of the powers conferred by the parent legislation, or it may be ultra vires (outside the powers granted by the parent legislation, and so unlawful),
- requires further explanation,
- has been published or laid before Assembly late, or
- is unclear or appears to contain mistakes.

As with all delegated legislation, because statutory instruments are made by a person exercising a power conferred by an act of Parliament for a specified purpose, rather than by Parliament exercising its sovereign law-making powers, they can be struck down by the courts if it is concluded that they are ultra vires (literally, outside the powers conferred by the parent act). This would be the case if the government attempts to use delegated legislation for a purpose not envision by the parent act, or if the legislation is an unreasonable use of the power conferred by the act, or if pre-conditions imposed by the act (for example, consultation with certain organisations) have not been satisfied.
