= List of statutory rules and orders of Northern Ireland, 1936 =

This is an incomplete list of statutory rules and orders of Northern Ireland during 1936. Statutory rules and orders were the predecessor of statutory rules and they formed the secondary legislation of Northern Ireland between 1922 and 1973.

| Number | Title |
|---|---|
| No. 1 | |
| No. 2 | The Gas: Rate of Payment to Ministry of Commerce Order (Northern Ireland) 1936 |
| No. 3 | |
| No. 4 | The Resident Magistrates (Salaries and Allowances) Order (Northern Ireland) 1936 |
| No. 5 | The Pigs Marketing (Special Levy) (No. 1) Order (Northern Ireland) 1936 |
| No. 6 - 9 | |
| No. 10 | The Acquisition of Road Motor Undertakings Order (Northern Ireland) 1936 |
| No. 11 | |
| No. 12 | The Goods Vehicles (Agricultural Vehicles) Regulations (Northern Ireland) 1936 |
| No. 13 | |
| No. 14 | The Teachers' Superannuation (Reciprocal Arrangements) (Amendment) Scheme (Northern Ireland) 1936 |
| No. 15 | The Warble Fly (Dressing of Cattle) Order (Northern Ireland) 1936 |
| No. 16 | The Unemployment Insurance (Inconsiderable Employments) Regulations (Northern Ireland) 1936 |
| No. 17 | The National Health Insurance (Dental Benefit) Amendment Regulations (Northern Ireland) 1936 |
| No. 18 | |
| No. 19 | The Probation Rules (Northern Ireland) 1936 |
| No. 20 | The Marketing of Potatoes Rules (Northern Ireland) 1936 |
| No. 21 | The National Health Insurance (Deposit Contributors) Amendment Regulations (Northern Ireland) 1936 |
| No. 22 | The Contributory Pensions (Joint Committee) Regulations (Northern Ireland) 1936 |
| No. 23 | |
| No. 24 | The National Health Insurance and Contributory Pensions (Voluntary Contributions) Amendment Regulations (Northern Ireland) 1936 |
| No. 25 | The Unemployment Insurance (Insurance Industry Special Scheme) (Variation and Amendment) Order (Northern Ireland) 1936 |
| No. 26 | The Local Authorities (Entertainments and Publicity Managers' Qualifications) Order (Northern Ireland) 1936 |
| No. 27 & 28 | |
| No. 29 | The Public Health (Immunisation against Diphtheria) Regulations (Northern Ireland) 1936 |
| No. 30 | The Pharmacy and Poisons Regulations (Northern Ireland) 1936 |
| No. 31 & 32 | |
| No. 33 | The Road Transport (Arbitration) Regulations (Northern Ireland) 1936 |
| No. 34 | The Pigs Marketing (Special Levy) (No. 2) Order (Northern Ireland) 1936 |
| No. 35 | The Urban District Councillors and Town Commissioners Election Order (Northern Ireland) 1936 |
| No. 36 | The Aldermen and Councillors of County Boroughs Election Order (Northern Ireland) 1936 |
| No. 37 | The Aldermen and Councillors of Boroughs Election Order (Northern Ireland) 1936 |
| No. 38 | |
| No. 39 | The Importation of Plants (Amendment) Order (Northern Ireland) 1936 |
| No. 40 | The Sale of Diseased Plants Order (Northern Ireland) 1936 |
| No. 41 - 45 | |
| No. 46 | The Unemployment Insurance (Reduction in the Weekly Rates of Continuance) Order (Northern Ireland) 1936 |
| No. 47 | The Civil Authorities (Special Powers) Unlawful Associations Order (Northern Ireland) 1936 |
| No. 48 | The Secondary School Examinations Amending No. 1 Regulations (Northern Ireland) 1936 |
| No. 49 | |
| No. 50 | The Labourers (Erection of Cottages) Order (Northern Ireland) 1936 |
| No. 51 | The Poor Law: Security of Officers Regulations (Northern Ireland) 1936 |
| No. 52 | The Public Health (Shell-fish) Regulations (Northern Ireland) 1936 |
| No. 53 | The Road Vehicles (Part Year Licensing) Order (Northern Ireland) 1936 |
| No. 54 | |
| No. 55 | The Butter and Cream Marketing Scheme (Approval) Order (Northern Ireland) 1936 |
| No. 56 | The Contributory Pensions (Full Time Instruction) Regulations (Northern Ireland) 1936 |
| No. 57 | The Unemployment Insurance (Inconsiderable Employments) Amendment Regulations (Northern Ireland) 1936 |
| No. 58 | The Local Government (Valuation) Regulations (Northern Ireland) 1936 |
| No. 59 | The Unemployment Insurance (Collection of Contributions) (Amendment) Regulations (Northern Ireland) 1936 |
| No. 60 | The Unemployment Insurance (Long Hirings in Agriculture) Regulations (Northern Ireland) 1936 |
| No. 61 | The Unemployment Insurance (Subsidiary Employments) (Agriculture) Regulations (Northern Ireland) 1936 |
| No. 62 | The Technical School Examinations Amending Regulations No. 1 (Northern Ireland) 1936 |
| No. 63 | The Unemployment Insurance (Exempt Persons) (Amendment) Regulations (Northern Ireland) 1936 |
| No. 64 | The Unemployment Insurance (Persons Employed in Agriculture etc.) (Benefit) Regulations (Northern Ireland) 1936 |
| No. 65 | The Grey Squirrels Order (Northern Ireland) 1936 |
| No. 66 - 69 | |
| No. 70 | The Goods Vehicles Regulations (Northern Ireland) 1936 |
| No. 71 | The Butter and Cream Marketing Scheme (Northern Ireland) Amendment (No. 1) Order (Northern Ireland) 1936 |
| No. 72 | The Public Service Vehicles (Licensing Fees) Regulations (Northern Ireland) 1936 |
| No. 73 | The Canals and Inland Navigation (Provisional Order, &c.) Regulations (Northern Ireland) 1936 |
| No. 74 | |
| No. 75 | The Motor Vehicles (Direction Indicator and Stop Light) Regulations (Northern Ireland) 1936 |
| No. 76 & 77 | |
| No. 78 | The Petroleum (Compressed Gases) Order (Northern Ireland) 1936 |
| No. 79 | The Pig Industry Council (Terms and Conditions of Office of Members) Rules (Northern Ireland) 1936 |
| No. 80 | The Diseases of Animals (Importation of Therapeutic Substances) Order (Northern Ireland) 1936 |
| No. 81 | |
| No. 82 | The Road and Railway Transport (Pooling Scheme) Order (Northern Ireland) 1936 |
| No. 83 | The Public Elementary Schools Amending Regulations, No. 2 (Northern Ireland) 1936 |
| No. 84 | |
| No. 85 | The Sheep Dipping (Special Regulation) Order (Northern Ireland) 1936 |
| No. 86 | The Petty Sessions: Districts and Times of Holding Order (Northern Ireland) 1936 |
| No. 87 | The Petty Sessions: Districts and Times of Holding Order (Northern Ireland) 1936 |
| No. 88 | The Petty Sessions: Districts and Times of Holding Order (Northern Ireland) 1936 |
| No. 89 | The Petty Sessions: Districts and Times of Holding Order (Northern Ireland) 1936 |
| No. 90 | The Petty Sessions: Districts and Times of Holding Order (Northern Ireland) 1936 |
| No. 91 | The Milk (Grade A) (Amendment) Regulations (Northern Ireland) 1936 |
| No. 92 | The Milk (Grade B) (Amendment) Regulations (Northern Ireland) 1936 |
| No. 93 | The Milk (Grade C) (Amendment) Regulations (Northern Ireland) 1936 |
| No. 94 | |
| No. 95 | The Contributory Pensions (Great Britain Reciprocal Arrangements) Regulations (Northern Ireland) 1936 |
| No. 96 | The Gas (Special Orders) Rules (Northern Ireland) 1936 |
| No. 97 | The Local Government (Finance) Regulations (Northern Ireland) 1936 |
| No. 98 | The Egg Marketing Cttee (Election of Members by Licensed Wholesale Dealers of Class A) Rules (Northern Ireland) 1936 |
| No. 99 | The Egg Marketing Cttee (Election of Members by Licensed Wholesale Dealers of Class B) Rules (Northern Ireland) 1936 |
| No. 100 | The Unemployment Insurance (Insurance Industry Special Scheme) (Variation and Amendment) Special Order (Northern Ireland) 1936 |
| No. 101 & 102 | |
| No. 103 | The National Health Insurance (Deposit Contributors Insurance Section) Amendment Regulations (Northern Ireland) 1936 |
| No. 104 | The Milk (Equalisation Payments) Regulations (Northern Ireland) 1936 |
| No. 105 | The Eggs, Marketing of (Appointed Day) Order (Northern Ireland) 1936 |
| No. 106 | The County Councils (Officers Qualifications) Order (Northern Ireland) 1936 |
| No. 107 | The Local Government (Valuation) Amending Regulations (Northern Ireland) 1936 |
| No. 108 | The Marketing of Potatoes No. 2 Rules (Northern Ireland) 1936 |
| No. 109 | The Milk (Grade B) (Amendment No. 2) Regulations (Northern Ireland) 1936 |
| No. 110 | The Milk (Grade C) (Amendment No. 2) Regulations (Northern Ireland) 1936 |
| No. 111 | |
| No. 112 | The Intoxicating Liquor: Licences: Rates of Charges Order (Northern Ireland) 1936 |
| No. 113 | The Gas Cylinders (Conveyance) Regulations (Northern Ireland) 1936 |
| No. 114 | The Butter and Cream (Grading and Marking) Order (Northern Ireland) 1936 |
| No. 115 | The Rural Districts Invested with Urban Powers Order (Northern Ireland) 1936 |
| No. 116 | |
| No. 117 | The Unemployment Insurance (Determination of Questions) Regulations (Northern Ireland) 1936 |
| No. 118 | |
| No. 119 | The Eggs, Marketing of (Appointed Day) Order (Northern Ireland) 1936 |
| No. 120 | The National Health Insurance (Small Societies Valuation Deficiencies) Regulations (Northern Ireland) 1936 |
| No. 121 | The Marketing of Eggs (Retailers') Rules (Northern Ireland) 1936 |
| No. 122 | The Unemployment Assistance (Determination of Need and Assessment of Needs) Regulations (Northern Ireland) 1936 |
| No. 123 | The Unemployment Act (Northern Ireland) 1934, (Second Appointed Day) Order (Northern Ireland) 1936 |
| No. 124 | |
| No. 125 | The Unemployment Insurance (Anomalies) (Seasonal Workers) (Amendment) Regulations (Northern Ireland) 1936 |
| No. 126 | The Unemployment Insurance (Benefit Miscellaneous Provisions) Amendment) Regulations (Northern Ireland) 1936 |
| No. 127 | The Malone Training School: Contributions Regulations (Northern Ireland) 1936 |
| No. 128 | The Unemployment Insurance (Long Hirings in Agriculture) (Amendment) Regulations (Northern Ireland) 1936 |
| No. 129 & 130 | |
| No. 131 | The Petty Sessions: Districts and Times of Holding Order (Northern Ireland) 1936 |
| No. 132 | The Secondary Teachers 1935 Amending No. 1 Regulations (Northern Ireland) 1936 |
| No. 133 | The Technical Teachers Amending No. 4 Regulations (Northern Ireland) 1936 |
| No. 134 | The Eggs, Marketing of (Appointed Day) Order (Northern Ireland) 1936 |
| No. 135 | The Parliamentary Grant (Education Authorities) Regulations (Northern Ireland) 1936 |
| No. 136 - 138 | |
| No. 139 | The National Health Insurance and Contrib. Pensions (Voluntary Contributors) Amendment (No. 2) Regulations (Northern Ireland) 1936 |
| No. 140 | The Local Authorities (Architects Qualifications) Order (Northern Ireland) 1936 |
| No. 141 | The Slaughtered Animals (Compensation) Act (Northern Ireland) 1928 (Suspension of Charges) Order (Northern Ireland) 1936 |
| No. 142 | |
| No. 143 | The Agricultural Teachers (Amending) Regulations (Northern Ireland) 1936 |
| No. 144 | |
| No. 145 | The Agricultural Produce (Meat Regulation) Rules (Northern Ireland) 1936 |
| No. 146 | The Unemployment Insurance (Persons Employed in Agriculture and Otherwise) Regulations (Northern Ireland) 1936 |
| No. 147 | The Unemployment Insurance (Crediting of Contributions) (Agriculture) Regulations (Northern Ireland) 1936 |
| No. 148 | The Unemployment Assistance (Temporary Provisions) Act (Northern Ireland) 1935 (Termination) Order (Northern Ireland) 1936 |
| No. 149 | The Superannuation (Female Civil Servants) Regulations (Northern Ireland) 1936 |
| No. 150 | The Superannuation (Allocation of Pension) Rules (Northern Ireland) 1936 |
| No. 151 | The Motor Cars (Silence Zone) (Holywood) Regulations (Northern Ireland) 1936 |
| No. 152 | The Unemployment Insurance (Return of Contributions) (Amendment) Regulations (Northern Ireland) 1936 |
| No. 153 | The Eggs, Marketing of (Appointed Day) Order (Northern Ireland) 1936 |
| No. 154 | The Revenue and Valuation (Presentation of Instruments) Regulations (Northern Ireland) 1936 |
| No. 155 | The Education (Miscellaneous Teachers) Superannuation Regulations (Northern Ireland) 1936 |
| No. 156 | The Education (Public Elementary Teachers) Superannuation Regulations (Northern Ireland) 1936 |
| No. 157 | The Education (Secondary and Preparatory Teachers) Superannuation Regulations (Northern Ireland) 1936 |
| No. 158 | The Education (Agricultural and Technical Teachers) Superannuation Regulations (Northern Ireland) 1936 |
| No. 159 | The Public Elementary Schools Regulations 1934 Amending No. 2 Regulations (Northern Ireland) 1936 |
| No. 160 & 161 | |
| No. 162 | The Royal Ulster Constabulary Allowances (Consolidation) (Amending) Order (Northern Ireland) 1936 |
| No. 163 & 164 | |
| No. 165 | The Petty Sessions Clerks and Assistant Petty Sessions Clerks (Appointments) Regulations (Northern Ireland) 1936 |
| No. 166 | |
| No. 167 | The Shift System in Factories and Workshops (Consultation of Workpeople) Order (Northern Ireland) 1936 |
| No. 168 | The National Health Insurance (Medical Benefit) Regulations (Northern Ireland) 1936 |
| No. 169 | The Secondary School Grants Amending No. 1 Regulations (Northern Ireland) 1936 |
| No. 170 | The Urban Districts Boundaries (Procedure) Order (Northern Ireland) 1936 |
| No. 171 & 172 | |
| No. 173 | The Importation of Plants (Amendment No. 2) Order (Northern Ireland) 1936 |
| No. 174 | The Marketing of Pigs (Form of Curers' Returns) Regulations (Northern Ireland) 1936 |
| No. 175 | The Transit of Carcases Order (Northern Ireland) 1936 |
| No. 176 | The Pigs Marketing (Grading) Order (Northern Ireland) 1936 |
| No. 177 | The National Health Insurance (Medical Benefit Council) Regulations (Northern Ireland) 1936 |
| No. 178 | The National Health Insurance (Insurance Practitioners' and Pharmaceutical Cttees) Regulations (Northern Ireland) 1936 |
| No. 179 | |
| No. 180 | The Contributory Pensions (Joint Committee) Regulations (Northern Ireland) 1936 |
| No. 181 | The Contributory Pensions (Notification of Incapacity) Regulations (Northern Ireland) 1936 |

== See also ==
- List of statutory rules of Northern Ireland
