= List of statutory rules and orders of Northern Ireland, 1950 =

This is an incomplete list of statutory rules and orders of Northern Ireland during 1950. Statutory rules and orders were the predecessor of statutory rules and they formed the secondary legislation of Northern Ireland between 1922 and 1973.

Number	Title
No. 1	
0 No. 2	The Health Services: General Scheme: Modification (Northern Ireland) 1950
No. 3	
0 No. 4	The Fire Services (Standard Fire Provision) (Northern Fire Authority) (Amendment) Regulations (Northern Ireland) 1950
0 No. 5	The Fire Services (Standard Fire Provision) (Western Fire Authority) (Amendment) Regulations (Northern Ireland) 1950
0 No. 6	The Fire Services (Standard Fire Provision) (Southern Fire Authority) (Amendment) Regulations (Northern Ireland) 1950
No. 7	
0 No. 8	The Gas - Rate of Payment to the Ministry of Commerce (Northern Ireland) 1950
0 No. 9	The Pharmacy and Poisons - Order in Council Amendment the Third Schedule of the Pharmacy and Poisons Act (Northern Ireland) 1950
0 No. 10	The Baking Wages Council Wages Regulations (Amendment) (No. 2) Order (Northern Ireland) 1950
0 No. 11	The National Insurance (Death Grant) Amendment Regulations (Northern Ireland) 1950
No. 12 & 13	
0 No. 14	The Health Services (Constitution of the Northern Ireland General Health Services Board) Order (Northern Ireland) 1950
0 No. 15	The Brush and Broom Wages Council (Constitution) Order (Northern Ireland) 1950
0 No. 16	The Nurses Act (Northern Ireland) 1946 (Commencement) Order (Northern Ireland) 1950
0 No. 17	The Baking Wages Council Wages Regulations (Amendment) (No. 1) Order (Northern Ireland) 1950
0 No. 18	The Nurses Agencies Regulations (Northern Ireland) 1950
No. 19	
0 No. 20	The Baking Wages Council Wages Regulations (Amendment) (No. 1) Order (Northern Ireland) 1950
0 No. 21	The Baking Wages Council Wages Regulations (Amendment) (No. 3) Order (Northern Ireland) 1950
0 No. 22	The County Court (CRecordn Proceedings) Rules (Northern Ireland) 1950
No. 23	
0 No. 24	The Road Vehicles (Newry) Regulations (Northern Ireland) 1950
0 No. 25	The National Insurance (Classification) Amendment Regulations (Northern Ireland) 1950
0 No. 26	The Public Health (Whalemeat) Regulations (Northern Ireland) 1950
0 No. 27	The Government Loans - Creation of Northern Ireland Loans Stock (Northern Ireland) 1950
0 No. 28	The Northern Ireland Loans Stock (Rate of Dividend and Redemption) Regulations (Northern Ireland) 1950
No. 29 & 30	
0 No. 31	The Petroleum-Spirit (Conveyance) Regulations (Northern Ireland) 1950
0 No. 32	The Road Tar Prices (Revocation) Order (Northern Ireland) 1950
0 No. 33	The Exchequer and Financial Provisions (Transitory Provisions) Order (Northern Ireland) 1950
0 No. 34	The Packing of Explosive for Conveyance Rules (Northern Ireland) 1950
0 No. 35	The Housing (Management of Accommodation) (Amendment) Regulations (Northern Ireland) 1950
0 No. 36	The Rope, Twine and Net Wages Council (Constitution) Order (Northern Ireland) 1950
0 No. 37	The Juvenile Courts (Constitution) Regulations (Northern Ireland) 1950
0 No. 38	The Children and Young Persons (Voluntary Homes) Regulations (Northern Ireland) 1950
0 No. 39	The Ulster Loans 5 per cent Stock (Redemption and Conversion) Regulations (Northern Ireland) 1950
No. 40	
0 No. 41	The Bee Pest Prevention Regulations (Northern Ireland) 1950
No. 42	
0 No. 43	The Children and Young Persons (Boarding Out) Regulations (Northern Ireland) 1950
0 No. 44	The Adoption Societies Regulations (Northern Ireland) 1950
0 No. 45	The Northern Ireland Treasury Bill Regulations (Northern Ireland) 1950
No. 46	
0 No. 47	The Registration Appeal Rules (Northern Ireland) 1950
0 No. 48	The Civil Authorities (Special Powers) Acts Regulations (Northern Ireland) 1950
0 No. 49	The Order in Council made under the Ryegrass Seed (Temporary Provisions) Act (Northern Ireland) 1950
0 No. 50	The Milk and Meals Amendment Regulations (Northern Ireland) 1950
0 No. 51	The Voluntary Grammar Schools Meals Grant Amendment Regulations (Northern Ireland) 1950
0 No. 52	The Parliamentary Grants (Local Education Authorities) Amendment Regulations (Northern Ireland) 1950
0 No. 53	The Fire Services (Finance) Regulations (Northern Ireland) 1950
No. 54 & 55	
0 No. 56	The Summary Jurisdiction (Children and Young Persons) Rules (Northern Ireland) 1950
0 No. 57	The Children and Young Persons (Record of Information) Regulations (Northern Ireland) 1950
0 No. 58	The Probation Rules (Northern Ireland) 1950
No. 59	
0 No. 60	The National Insurance (Claims and Payments) Amendment Regulations (Northern Ireland) 1950
No. 61	
0 No. 62	The Aerated Waters Wages Council (Constitution) Order (Northern Ireland) 1950
0 No. 63	The Coal Supply (Temporary Provisions) Order (Northern Ireland) 1950
0 No. 64	The Coke Supply (Revocation) Order (Northern Ireland) 1950
0 No. 65	The Health Services (General Dental Services - Fees) (Amendment) Regulations (Northern Ireland) 1950
0 No. 66	The Health Services (Availability of Services) Regulations (Northern Ireland) 1950
0 No. 67	The National Insurance (Contributions) Amendment Regulations (Northern Ireland) 1950
0 No. 68	The Road Vehicles (Registration and Licensing) (Amendment) Regulations (Northern Ireland) 1950
No. 69	
0 No. 70	The Superannuation (War Service) Order (Northern Ireland) 1950
0 No. 71	The Intermediate School (Grant Conditions) Amendment Regulations (Northern Ireland) 1950
No. 72	
0 No. 73	The Public Health (Infectious Diseases) (Chicken-pox) (Revocation) Regulations (Northern Ireland) 1950
0 No. 74	The Scientific Research Grants Regulations (Northern Ireland) 1950
No. 75	
0 No. 76	The Local Government Superannuation (Allocation of Pension) Rules (Northern Ireland) 1950
No. 77	
0 No. 78	The Mechanically Propelled Vehicles (Reduced Licence Duty) - (Specified Date) Order (Northern Ireland) 1950
0 No. 79	The Health Services (Payment of Fees) Regulations (Northern Ireland) 1950
0 No. 80	The Housing (Grants) Order (Northern Ireland) 1950
0 No. 81	The Housing (Houses built for Letting) (Amendment) Regulations (Northern Ireland) 1950
0 No. 82	The Housing (Owner Occupation) (Amendment) Regulations (Northern Ireland) 1950
0 No. 83	The Welfare Authorities (Charges for Residential Accommodation) Regulations (Northern Ireland) 1950
0 No. 84	The National Assistance (Determination of Need) Amendment Regulations (Northern Ireland) 1950
0 No. 85	The Hat, Cap and Millinery Wages Council Wages Regulations (Holidays) Order (Northern Ireland) 1950
0 No. 86	The Adoption of Children (Duties of Registrars) Regulations (Northern Ireland) 1950
0 No. 87	The Factories (Forms and Particulars) Order (Northern Ireland) 1950
0 No. 88	The Intoxicating Liquor (Compensation Charges) Order (Northern Ireland) 1950
0 No. 89	The Interchange of Teachers (Amendment) Regulations (Northern Ireland) 1950
0 No. 90	The Control of Building Operations (No. 2) Order (Northern Ireland) 1950
0 No. 91	The Marketing of Poultry Act (N.I) 1949: Appointed Day Order (Northern Ireland) 1950
0 No. 92	The Dangerous Drugs Act (Application) Order (Northern Ireland) 1950
0 No. 93	The Grammar School (Grant Conditions) Amendment Regulations (Northern Ireland) 1950
0 No. 94	The Employment of Teachers (National Insurance Contributions Grants) Regulations (Northern Ireland) 1950
0 No. 95	The Intermediate School (Grant Conditions) Amendment Regulations (Northern Ireland) 1950
0 No. 96	The Parliamentary Grants (Local Education Authorities) Amendment Regulations (Northern Ireland) 1950
0 No. 97	The Ulster Special Constabulary Pensions Regulations (Northern Ireland) 1950
0 No. 98	The Royal Ulster Constabulary Pay Order (Northern Ireland) 1950
0 No. 99	The Royal Ulster Constabulary (Women Members) Pay Order (Northern Ireland) 1950
0 No. 100	The Children and Young Persons (Collection of Parental Contributions) Regulations (Northern Ireland) 1950
0 No. 101	The Feeding Stuffs (Directions) Order (Northern Ireland) 1950
No. 102 & 103	
0 No. 104	The Further Education (Grant Conditions) Amendment Regulations (Northern Ireland) 1950
0 No. 105	The Ulster Savings Certificates: Third Issue (Northern Ireland) 1950
0 No. 106	The Primary Schools (General) (Amendment) Regulations (Northern Ireland) 1950
No. 107	
0 No. 108	The Public Health (Infectious Diseases) Regulations (Northern Ireland) 1950
0 No. 109	The Joint Nursing and Midwives Council (Constitution) Order (Northern Ireland) 1950
No. 110	
0 No. 111	The National Insurance (Classification) Amendment (No. 2) Regulations (Northern Ireland) 1950
0 No. 112	The Lough and River Erne Drainage and Navigation Board Dissolution Order (Northern Ireland) 1950
0 No. 113	The Transferred Undertakings (Compensation to Employees) Regulations (Northern Ireland) 1950
0 No. 114	The Transferred Undertakings (Pensions of Employees Losing Employment, etc.) Regulations (Northern Ireland) 1950
0 No. 115	The Health Services (Superannuation) (Amendment) Regulations (Northern Ireland) 1950
No. 116	
0 No. 117	Dry Cleaning (Special Regulations) (Northern Ireland) 1950
No. 118 & 119	
0 No. 120	The Retail Bespoke Tailoring Wages Council Wages Regulations Order (Northern Ireland) 1950
No. 121 & 122	
0 No. 123	The Adoption of Children County Court Rules (Northern Ireland) 1950
0 No. 124	The National Insurance (Classification) Amendment (No. 3) Regulations (Northern Ireland) 1950
0 No. 125	The Motor Cars (Speed) Regulations (Northern Ireland) 1950
0 No. 126	The Grammar Schools (Admissions, Scholarships and Special Allowances, School Year 1950–1951) Regulations (Northern Ireland) 1950
No. 127	
0 No. 128	The Health Services (General Medical and Pharmaceutical Services) (Amendment) Regulations (Northern Ireland) 1950
0 No. 129	The Petty Sessions Districts and Times: Petty Sessions District of Bangor (Northern Ireland) 1950
0 No. 130	The Children and Young Persons (Children's Officer) Regulations (Northern Ireland) 1950
0 No. 131	The National Insurance (Claims and Payments) Amendment (No. 2) Regulations (Northern Ireland) 1950
0 No. 132	The Marketing of Fruit Rules (Northern Ireland) 1950
0 No. 133	The Amendment of Livestock Breeding Act (Northern Ireland) 1922 Order (Northern Ireland) 1950
0 No. 134	The Livestock Breeding (Licensing of Bulls) Rules (Northern Ireland) 1950
0 No. 135	The Sheep Dipping (Special Regulations) Order (Northern Ireland) 1950
0 No. 136	The Government Loans: Northern Ireland Loans Stock: Creation (Northern Ireland) 1950
0 No. 137	The Northern Ireland Loans Stock (Rate of Dividend and Redemption) (No. 2) Regulations (Northern Ireland) 1950
0 No. 138	The Petty Sessions Districts and Times: Petty Sessions Districts of Glenarm and Crossmaglen (Northern Ireland) 1950
0 No. 139	The National Insurance (Seasonal Workers) Regulations (Northern Ireland) 1950
0 No. 140	The Training Schools (Contributions by Local Authorities) Regulations (Northern Ireland) 1950
No. 141	
0 No. 142	The Poisons Regulations (Northern Ireland) 1950
0 No. 143	The Baking Wages Council Wages Regulations (Amendment) (No. 6) Order (Northern Ireland) 1950
0 No. 144	The Baking Wages Council Wages Regulations (Amendment) No. 4) Order (Northern Ireland) 1950
0 No. 145	The Baking Wages Council Wages Regulations (Amendment) (No. 5) Order (Northern Ireland) 1950
0 No. 146	The Supplementary Eye Services (Amendment) Regulations (Northern Ireland) 1950
0 No. 147	The Mental Health (Qualifications of Medical Officers and Medical Practitioners) Regulations (Northern Ireland) 1950
0 No. 148	The Mental Health (Institutions) Order (Northern Ireland) 1950
0 No. 149	The Laundry Wages Council Wages Regulations (Holidays) Order (Northern Ireland) 1950
0 No. 150	The Poultry Hatcheries Act (Northern Ireland) 1950 - Appointed Day Order (Northern Ireland) 1950
0 No. 151	The Marketing of Ryegrass Seed Regulations (Northern Ireland) 1950
0 No. 152	The Poultry Hatcheries Regulations (Northern Ireland) 1950
0 No. 153	The Northern Ireland 33% Stock (Redemption) and Northern Ireland 3% Loans Stock (Exchange) Regulations (Northern Ireland) 1950
0 No. 154	The Examination Committees (Grants) Regulations (Northern Ireland) 1950
0 No. 155	The National Insurance (Residence and Persons Abroad) Amendment Regulations (Northern Ireland) 1950
0 No. 156	The Diseases of Animals (Poultry) (Amendment) Order (Northern Ireland) 1950
No. 157 - 159	
0 No. 160	The Health Services (General Medical and Pharmaceutical Services) (Amendment) (No. 2) Regulations (Northern Ireland) 1950
0 No. 161	The Summary Jurisdiction - Petty Sessions Districts and Times - Co. Antrim and Co. Londonderry (Northern Ireland) 1950
0 No. 162	The Scutch Mills and Flax (Fire Insurance) (Amendment) Regulations (Northern Ireland) 1950
0 No. 163	The Marketing of Poultry Rules (Northern Ireland) 1950
0 No. 164	The Marketing of Eggs (Amendment) Rules (Northern Ireland) 1950
0 No. 165	The Audit - Examination of Accounts - Land Purchase (Sale of Holdings) Account - Regulations (Northern Ireland) 1950
0 No. 166	The Health Services (Local Ambulance Services) Order (Northern Ireland) 1950
0 No. 167	The Linen and Cotton Handkerchief and Household Goods and Linen Piece Goods Wages Council Wages Regulations (Amendment) Order (Northern Ireland) 1950
0 No. 168	The Probation (Payments by Probationers) Regulations (Northern Ireland) 1950
0 No. 169	The Fire Services (Qualifications of Fire Officers) Regulations (Northern Ireland) 1950
0 No. 170	The Fire Services (Conditions of Service) Regulations (Northern Ireland) 1950
0 No. 171	The Agricultural Goods and Services (Marginal Production Feeding Stuffs Assistance) Regulations (Northern Ireland) 1950
0 No. 172	The Royal Ulster Constabulary Pensions (Amendment) Order (Northern Ireland) 1950
0 No. 173	The Factories (Examination of Plant) (Revocation) Order (Northern Ireland) 1950
0 No. 174	The Superannuation Act (Northern Ireland) (Application to Transferred Irish Officers) Rules (Northern Ireland) 1950
0 No. 175	The Federated Superannuation System for Universities (Temporary Service and War Service) Regulations (Northern Ireland) 1950
0 No. 176	The Foreign Hay and Straw Order (Northern Ireland) 1950
0 No. 177	The Small Dwellings Acquisition (Market Value) Order (Northern Ireland) 1950
0 No. 178	The Mental Health (Fees for Medical Certificates) Regulations (Northern Ireland) 1950
0 No. 179	The Ulster Special Constabulary (Appointment and Position) Regulations (Northern Ireland) 1950
0 No. 180	The Government Loans - Creation of Five Million Pounds of Northern Ireland Loans Stock (Northern Ireland) 1950
0 No. 181	The Northern Ireland Loans Stock (Rate of Dividend and Redemption) (No. 3) Regulations (Northern Ireland) 1950
0 No. 182	The Baking Wages Council Wages Regulations (No. 1) Order (Northern Ireland) 1950
0 No. 183	The Baking Wages Council Wages Regulations (No. 2) Order (Northern Ireland) 1950
0 No. 184	The Baking Wages Council Wages Regulations (No. 3) Order (Northern Ireland) 1950
0 No. 185	The Royal Ulster Constabulary Pay (Amendment) Order (Northern Ireland) 1950
0 No. 186	The Northern Ireland Loans Stock (Prescribed Joint Stock Bank) Regulations (Northern Ireland) 1950
0 No. 187	The Northern Ireland Loans Stock Regulations (Northern Ireland) 1950
0 No. 188	The Training College Teachers' (Salaries and Allowances) Amendment Regulations (Northern Ireland) 1950
0 No. 189	The Exchequer and Government Loans Fund (Stock Regulations Revocation) Order (Northern Ireland) 1950
0 No. 190	The Health Services (Payment of Fees) (Amendment) Regulations (Northern Ireland) 1950
0 No. 191	The Local Government (Designated Bodies) (Superannuation) Regulations (Northern Ireland) 1950
0 No. 192	The Housing Subsidy Order (Northern Ireland) 1950
0 No. 193	The County Council (Surveyors Qualifications) Order (Northern Ireland) 1950
0 No. 194	The Government Loans - Creation of Two Million Pounds of Northern Ireland Loans Stock (Northern Ireland) 1950
0 No. 195	The Northern Ireland Loans Stock (Rate of Dividend and Redemption) (No. 4) Regulations (Northern Ireland) 1950
0 No. 196	The Government Loans - Creation of Northern Ireland Loans Stock (Northern Ireland) 1950
0 No. 197	The Northern Ireland Loans Stock (Rate of Dividend and Redemption) (No. 5) Regulations (Northern Ireland) 1950
0 No. 198	The Public Service Vehicles (Construction) (Amendment) Regulations (Northern Ireland) 1950
0 No. 199	The Bacon Industry (Pig Husbandry Research Grant) Order (Northern Ireland) 1950
0 No. 200	The Fire Services (Discipline) Regulations (Northern Ireland) 1950
0 No. 201	The Training Colleges (Admission of Students) Regulations (Northern Ireland) 1950
No. 202	
0 No. 203	The Grinding of Metals Special Regulations (Northern Ireland) 1950
0 No. 204	The Rope, Twine and Net Wages Council Wages Regulations Order (Northern Ireland) 1950
0 No. 205	The Blasting (Castings and Other Articles) Special Regulations (Northern Ireland) 1950
0 No. 206	The Civil Defence (Auxiliary Fire Services) Regulations (Northern Ireland) 1950
0 No. 207	The Belfast and County Down Railway Company (Winding up) Order (Northern Ireland) 1950
0 No. 208	The Health Services (Medical Practices Compensation) Regulations (Northern Ireland) 1950
0 No. 209	The National Insurance (Industrial Injuries) (Claims and Payments) Amendment Regulations (Northern Ireland) 1950
0 No. 210	The National Insurance (Industrial Injuries) (Medical Certification) Amendment Regulations (Northern Ireland) 1950
0 No. 211	The Intermediate School (Grant Conditions) Amendment Regulations (No. 3) (Northern Ireland) 1950
0 No. 212	The Malone Training School (Contributions) Regulations (Northern Ireland) 1950
0 No. 213	The Fire Services (Finance) (No. 2) Regulations (Northern Ireland) 1950
0 No. 214	The Giant's Causeway, Portrush and Bush Valley Railway and Tramways (Abandonment) (No. 1) Order (Northern Ireland) 1950
0 No. 215	The Mechanically Propelled Vehicles (Termination of Emergency Provisions) Order (Northern Ireland) 1950
0 No. 216	The State Exhibitions Regulations (Northern Ireland) 1950
No. 217 & 218	
0 No. 219	The Grammar Schools (Grant Conditions) Amendment Regulations No. 2 (Northern Ireland) 1950
0 No. 220	The Motor Cars (Speed) (Amendment) Regulations (Northern Ireland) 1950
No. 221	
0 No. 222	The Utility Furniture (Markings and Supply) (No. 2) Order (Northern Ireland) 1950
0 No. 223	The Health Services (General Medical and Pharmaceutical Services) (Amendment) (No. 3) Regulations (Northern Ireland) 1950
0 No. 224	The Road Vehicles Lighting Regulations (Northern Ireland) 1950
0 No. 225	The Local Government (Superannuation) (Amendment) Regulations (Northern Ireland) 1950
0 No. 226	The Registrar's Districts of Armagh and Blackwaterstown - Alteration of Boundaries (Northern Ireland) 1950
0 No. 227	The Road Vehicles (Registration and Licensing) (Amendment) (No. 2) Regulations (Northern Ireland) 1950
0 No. 228	The Tobacco Wages Council (Constitution) Order (Northern Ireland) 1950
0 No. 229	The Census of Production (Exemption) Order (Northern Ireland) 1950
0 No. 230	The Employment and Training (Payment of Travelling Expenses) Regulations (Northern Ireland) 1950
0 No. 231	The Educational Services (Central Council of Physical Recreation) Grant Regulations (Northern Ireland) 1950
0 No. 232	The General Waste Materials Reclamation Wages Council Wages Regulations Order (Northern Ireland) 1950
0 No. 233	The Baking Wages Council Wages Regulations (Holidays) Order (Northern Ireland) 1950
0 No. 234	The Laundry Wages Council Wages Regulations Order (Northern Ireland) 1950

== See also ==
- List of statutory rules of Northern Ireland
