= List of statutory rules and orders of Northern Ireland, 1924 =

Northern Irish legislative measures

This is an incomplete list of statutory rules and orders of Northern Ireland during 1922. Statutory rules and orders were the predecessor of statutory rules and they formed the secondary legislation of Northern Ireland between 1922 and 1973.

Number	Title
No. 1	The Street Collections Regulations (Northern Ireland) 1924
No. 2	The County and Rural District Councillors Election Order (Northern Ireland) 1924
No. 3	The Guardians Election Order (Northern Ireland) 1924
No. 4	The Education (Religious Instruction) Regulations (Northern Ireland) 1924
No. 5	The Payments to Teachers in Elementary Schools Regulations (Northern Ireland) 1924
No. 6	The Local Government (Closing of Roads) Order (Northern Ireland) 1924
No. 7	The Local Government (Procedure of Councils) Order (Northern Ireland) 1924
No. 8	The Cinematograph Exhibition Regulations (Northern Ireland) 1924
No. 9	The Gas, Payment by undertakers to Ministry of Commerce Order (Northern Ireland) 1924
No. 10	The Public Bodies Order (Northern Ireland) 1924
No. 11	
No. 12	The Grants to Preparatory, Intermediate and Secondary Schools Regulations (Northern Ireland) 1924
No. 13 & 14	
No. 15	The Rates of Interest (Housing) Order (Northern Ireland) 1924
No. 16	The Workmen's Compensation (Industrial Diseases) Order (Northern Ireland) 1924
No. 17	The Public Bodies Order (No. 2) (Northern Ireland) 1924
No. 18	The Intoxicating Liquor (Procedure) Rules (Northern Ireland) 1924
No. 19	The Education (Grant in Aid of Expenses) Regulations (Northern Ireland) 1924
No. 20	The County Surveyors Qualification Order (Northern Ireland) 1924
No. 21	The National Health Insurance (Credits to Approved Societies) Regulations (Northern Ireland) 1924
No. 22	The Poor Law Guardians, District Electoral Divisions (Northern Ireland) 1924
No. 23	
No. 24	The Trade Boards: Notice under Trade Boards Act Regulations (Northern Ireland) 1924
No. 25 - 27	
No. 28	The Education (Public Elementary Schools) Regulations (Northern Ireland) 1924
No. 29	The Workmen's Compensation (Medical Referees) Regulations (Northern Ireland) 1924
No. 30	The Medical Referee, reference to Regulations (Northern Ireland) 1924
No. 31	The Public Elementary Education (Training College Grants) Regulations (Northern Ireland) 1924
No. 32	The Public Elementary Education (Transitional Services) Regulations (Northern Ireland) 1924
No. 33	The Public Elementary Education (Miscellaneous Services) Regulations (Northern Ireland) 1924
No. 34	The National Health Insurance (Deposit Contributors) Amendment Regulations (Northern Ireland) 1924
No. 35	The Teachers' Residences (Transitional) Regulations (Northern Ireland) 1924
No. 36	The County and Rural District Councillors No. 2 Election Order (Northern Ireland) 1924
No. 37	The Royal Ulster Constabulary,Officers and Constables Limit of Age Order (Northern Ireland) 1924
No. 38 - 41	
No. 42	The Royal Ulster Constabulary,Reward Fund Regulations (Northern Ireland) 1924
No. 43	The Education (School Attendance) Regulations (Northern Ireland) 1924
No. 44	
No. 45	The Trade Boards (Laundry) (Constitution, Proceedings and Meetings) Regulations (Northern Ireland) 1924
No. 46	The Parliamentary Elections Returning Officers' Expenses Order (Northern Ireland) 1924
No. 47	The Metalliferous Mines and Quarries (First Aid Equipment) Order (Northern Ireland) 1924
No. 48 & 49	
No. 50	The Asylum Books and Records (Third Amendment) Order (Northern Ireland) 1924
No. 51	
No. 52	The Irish Land (Lay Assessors) Order (Northern Ireland) 1924
No. 53	
No. 54	The Unemployment Insurance (Insurance Year) Regulations (Northern Ireland) 1924
No. 55	The Old Age Pensions Consolidated Regulations (Northern Ireland) 1924
No. 56	The Justice of the Peace, Fee on Appointment Order (Northern Ireland) 1924
No. 57	
No. 58	The Unemployment Insurance Order (Northern Ireland) 1924
No. 59	The Brush and Broom Trade Board Regulations (Northern Ireland) 1924
No. 60	The Local Government (Procedure of Councils) No. 2 Order (Northern Ireland) 1924
No. 61	
No. 62	The Education, Secondary Salaries Regulations (Northern Ireland) 1924
No. 63	The Parliamentary Elections, Returning Officers' Expenses (Bye-Elections) Order (Northern Ireland) 1924
No. 64	
No. 65	The Trade Boards (Retail Bespoke Tailoring Trade, Northern Ireland) (Constitution, Proceedings and Meetings) Regulations (Northern Ireland) 1924
No. 66	The Heavy Motor Car (Amendment) Order (Northern Ireland) 1924
No. 67	The Live Stock Breeding Rules (Northern Ireland) 1924
No. 68	The Technical Schools and Classes Regulations (Northern Ireland) 1924
No. 69	The Under Sheriff, fees payable for account of Order (Northern Ireland) 1924
No. 70	The Grant in Aid of Expenses of Education Authorities Regulations (Northern Ireland) 1924
No. 71	The Education (Medical Inspection and Treatment of Children) Regulations (Northern Ireland) 1924
No. 72 & 73	
No. 74	The Trade Boards (Sugar Confectionery and Food Preserving) (Constitution, Proceedings and Meetings) Regulations (Northern Ireland) 1924
No. 75	
No. 76	The Local Authorities (Parliamentary Grants) Regulations (Northern Ireland) 1924
No. 77	The Marketing of Eggs Rules (Northern Ireland) 1924
No. 78	The Road Vehicles (Registration and Licensing) (Amendment) Order (Northern Ireland) 1924
No. 79	The Gas Meter (Fees) Order (Northern Ireland) 1924
No. 80	
No. 81	The Constabulary (Acquisition of Land) Order (Northern Ireland) 1924
No. 82	The National Health Insurance (Insurance Committees) Regulations (Northern Ireland) 1924
No. 83	The Electricity Commissioners' Rules (Northern Ireland) 1924
No. 84	The Industrial Assurance (Courts Emergency Powers) Regulations (Northern Ireland) 1924
No. 85	The Road Vehicles (Part Year Licensing) Order (Northern Ireland) 1924
No. 86	The Trade Boards (Linen and Cotton Handkerchief and Household Goods and Linen Piece Goods) (Constitution, Proceedings and Meetings) Regulations (Northern Ireland) 1924
No. 87	The National Health Insurance (Collection of Contributions) Regulations (Northern Ireland) 1924
No. 88	The National Health Insurance (Compensation Agreements) Regulations (Northern Ireland) 1924
No. 89	The National Health Insurance (Decision of Questions) Regulations (Northern Ireland) 1924
No. 90	The National Health Insurance (Exempt Persons) Amendment Regulations (Northern Ireland) 1924
No. 91	
No. 92	The National Health Insurance (Exempt Persons) Regulations (Northern Ireland) 1924
No. 93	The Trade Boards (General Waste Materials Reclamation) (Constitution, Proceedings and Meetings) Regulations (Northern Ireland) 1924
No. 94	The Industrial Assurance (Individual Transfer) Regulations (Northern Ireland) 1924
No. 95 - 97	
No. 98	The National Health Insurance (Outworkers) Order (Northern Ireland) 1924
No. 99	The Unemployment Insurance (Commencement of Periods) Regulations (Northern Ireland) 1924
No. 100	The Employment under Local and Public Authorities Order (Northern Ireland) 1924
No. 101	The Industrial Assurance (Fees) Regulations (Northern Ireland) 1924
No. 102	
No. 103	The Industrial Assurance (Deposits, &c.) Rules (Northern Ireland) 1924
No. 104	The Unemployment Insurance (Compensation for Refund) Regulations (Northern Ireland) 1924
No. 105	The Unemployment Insurance (Repayment and Return Contributions) (Amendment) Regulations (Northern Ireland) 1924
No. 106	The Housing Grant Rules (Northern Ireland) 1924
No. 107	The Petty Sessions Clerks Salaries Order (Northern Ireland) 1924
No. 108	The Prisons Order (Northern Ireland) 1924
No. 109	The Ulster Special Constabulary Pensions Order (Northern Ireland) 1924
No. 110	The Ulster Special Constabulary Pensions (Amendment) Order (Northern Ireland) 1924
No. 111	The Black Scab in Potatoes No. 1 Order (Northern Ireland) 1924
No. 112	The Colorado Beetle Order (Northern Ireland) 1924
No. 113	The Labourers Acts (Grants) Regulations (Northern Ireland) 1924
No. 114	The County Infirmaries and Fever Hospital (Accounts) Order (Northern Ireland) 1924
No. 115	The Irish Sailors and Soldiers Trust Transfer of Land Order (Northern Ireland) 1924
No. 116	The Labourers (Northern Ireland) Order 1924

== See also ==
- List of statutory rules of Northern Ireland
