= List of statutory rules and orders of Northern Ireland, 1925 =

This is an incomplete list of statutory rules and orders of Northern Ireland during 1925. Statutory rules and orders were the predecessor of statutory rules and they formed the secondary legislation of Northern Ireland between 1922 and 1973.

Number	Title
No. 1	The Road Vehicles (Registration and Licensing) Regulations (Northern Ireland) 1925
No. 2	The National Health Insurance (Requisition for Birth, &c. Certificates) Regulations (Northern Ireland) 1925
No. 3	The Pupil Teachers and Monitors Regulations (Northern Ireland) 1925
No. 4	The National Health and Unemployment Insurance (Inspectors' Certificates) Regulations (Northern Ireland) 1925
No. 5	The National Health Insurance (Normal Rate of Remuneration) Order (Northern Ireland) 1925
No. 6 - 8	
No. 9	The Gas, Rate of Payment to Ministry of Commerce Order (Northern Ireland) 1925
No. 10	The Trade Boards District Committee (Boot and Shoe Repairing) Regulations (Northern Ireland) 1925
No. 11	The District Trade Committees Regulations (Northern Ireland) 1925
No. 12	The National Health Insurance (Deposit Contributors) Regulations (Northern Ireland) 1925
No. 13	The Trade Boards (Wholesale Mantle and Costume) (Constitution, Proceedings and Meetings) Regulations (Northern Ireland) 1925
No. 14	
No. 15	The Foreign Seed Potatoes Order (Northern Ireland) 1925
No. 16	The Royal Ulster Constabulary Pension Order (Northern Ireland) 1925
No. 17	The Grants to Preparatory, Intermediate and Secondary Schools Regulations (Northern Ireland) 1925
No. 18	The Royal Ulster Constabulary Allowances Order (Northern Ireland) 1925
No. 19	The Education, Advisory Council Order (Northern Ireland) 1925
No. 20	The Industrial Assurance (Deposits, &c.) Rules (Northern Ireland) 1925
No. 21	
No. 22	The Trade Boards (Linen and Cotton Embroidery) (Constitution, Proceedings and Meetings) Regulations (Northern Ireland) 1925
No. 23	The Trade Boards (Hat, Cap and Millinery) (Constitution, Proceedings and Meetings) Regulations (Northern Ireland) 1925
No. 24	The Parliamentary Elections, Returning Officers' Expenses (Northern Ireland) 1925
No. 25	The Illegitimate Children (Affiliation Orders) Rules (Northern Ireland) 1925
No. 26	The Explosives in Coal Mines Order (Northern Ireland) 1925
No. 27	The Business Names Rules (Northern Ireland) 1925
No. 28	The Trade Boards (Paper Box) (Constitution, Proceedings and Meetings) Regulations (Northern Ireland) 1925
No. 29	The Teachers (Secondary and Preparatory) Superannuation Scheme (Northern Ireland) 1925
No. 30	The Teachers (Public Elementary) Superannuation Scheme (Northern Ireland) 1925
No. 31	The Joint Visiting Committees Order (Northern Ireland) 1925
No. 32	The Education Authorities (Acquisition of Land) Order (Northern Ireland) 1925
No. 33	The Education Authorities BorRecording Regulations (Northern Ireland) 1925
No. 34	The Petroleum Storage Regulations (Northern Ireland) 1925
No. 35	The Royal Ulster Constabulary Reward Fund Amendment Regulations (Northern Ireland) 1925
No. 36	The Unemployment Insurance (Repayment and Return of Contributions) (Amendment) (No. 2) Regulations (Northern Ireland) 1925
No. 37	
No. 38	The Trade Boards (Readymade and Wholesale Bespoke Tailoring) (Constitution, Proceedings and Meetings) Regulations (Northern Ireland) 1925
No. 39	
No. 40	The Explosives: Employment of Young Persons in Magazines Order (Northern Ireland) 1925
No. 41	The Explosives: Employment of Young Persons in Factories Order (Northern Ireland) 1925
No. 42	The Explosives: Employment of Young Persons in Small Firework Factories Order (Northern Ireland) 1925
No. 43	The Explosives: Employment of Young Persons in Stores Licensed for Mixed Explosives Order (Northern Ireland) 1925
No. 44	The Unemployment Insurance (Courses of Instruction) Regulations (Northern Ireland) 1925
No. 45	The National Health Insurance (Expenses of Medical Certification) Regulations (Northern Ireland) 1925
No. 46	The Census of Production (No. 1) Rules (Northern Ireland) 1925
No. 47 & 48	
No. 49	The Factory and Workshop (Notification of Diseases) Order (Northern Ireland) 1925
No. 50	The Education: Grants to Technical Schools and Classes Regulations (Northern Ireland) 1925
No. 51	The Regulations for Secondary Salaries (Amendment Regulations No. 1) (Northern Ireland) 1925
No. 52 - 58	
No. 59	The Treasury Bills (Preparation, Issue and Cancellation) Regulations (Northern Ireland) 1925
No. 60	The Trade Boards (Dressmaking and Women's Light Clothing Trade) (Constitution, Proceedings and Meetings) Regulations (Northern Ireland) 1925
No. 61 & 62	
No. 63	The Census of Production (No. 6) Rules (Northern Ireland) 1925
No. 64	The Special Constabulary Reward Fund Regulations (Northern Ireland) 1925
No. 65	The National Health Insurance (Unclaimed Proceeds of Stamp Sales) Regulations (Northern Ireland) 1925
No. 66	The Teachers in Agricultural Subjects Regulations (Northern Ireland) 1925
No. 67	The Unemployment Insurance (Insurance Year) Regulations (Northern Ireland) 1925
No. 68	
No. 69	The Workmen's Compensation (Ironworkers' Cataract) Order (Northern Ireland) 1925
No. 70	The Unemployment Insurance (Employment under Local and Public Authorities) Order (Northern Ireland) 1925
No. 71	The Unemployment Insurance (Subsidiary Employments) Consolidated Order (Northern Ireland) 1925
No. 72	The Trade Boards (Shirtmaking) (Constitution, Proceedings and Meetings) Regulations (Northern Ireland) 1925
No. 73	The Live Stock Breeding Rules (Northern Ireland) 1925
No. 74 & 75	
No. 76	The Public Health (Imported Food) Regulations (Northern Ireland) 1925
No. 77	The Land Purchase: Issue of Land Certificates Rule (Northern Ireland) 1925
No. 78	
No. 79	The Unemployment Insurance (Deceased or Insane Persons) (Appointment of Representatives) Regulations (Northern Ireland) 1925
No. 80	The Explosives, Packing for Conveyance Order (Northern Ireland) 1925
No. 81	The Explosives, Conveyance on Roads Order (Northern Ireland) 1925
No. 82	The Trade Boards (Boot and Shoe Repairing) (Constitution, Proceedings and Meetings) Regulations (Northern Ireland) 1925
No. 83	The National Health Insurance (Subsidiary Employments) Consolidated Order (Northern Ireland) 1925
No. 84	The Land Acquisition (Assessment of Compensation) Fees Rules (Northern Ireland) 1925
No. 85	The Prisons, Boards of Visitors for Convict Prisons Rules (Northern Ireland) 1925
No. 86	The Prisons, Appointment for Particular Localities Order (Northern Ireland) 1925
No. 87	The Unemployment Insurance Order (Northern Ireland) 1925
No. 88	
No. 89	The Parliamentary Elections, Returning Officers' Expenses (No. 2) Order (Northern Ireland) 1925
No. 90	The Prisons, Visiting Committees Rules (Northern Ireland) 1925
No. 91	The Prisons: Government of Ordinary and of Convict, Rules (Northern Ireland) 1925
No. 92	The Land Trust (Adaptation of Labourers Acts) Joint Order (Northern Ireland) 1925
No. 93	The Land (Provision for Sailors and Soldiers) Order (Northern Ireland) 1925
No. 94	
No. 95	The Teachers in Agricultural Subjects Order (Northern Ireland) 1925
No. 96 & 97	
No. 98	The Prisons (Visiting Committees) Order (Northern Ireland) 1925
No. 99	The Dispensary Districts Order (Northern Ireland) 1925
No. 100	The Estate Duty Order (Northern Ireland) 1925
No. 101	
No. 102	The Parliamentary Grant in Aid of Expenses of Education Authorities (Northern Ireland) 1925
No. 103	The Civil Service Superannuation Regulations (Northern Ireland) 1925
No. 104	The Intoxicating Liquor (Procedure) Rules (Northern Ireland) 1925
No. 105	The Ulster Loans Stock (Rate Per Cent. of Dividends and Redemption) Order (Northern Ireland) 1925
No. 106	The Ulster Loans Stock, Warrant Creating £2 million Order (Northern Ireland) 1925
No. 107	The Ulster Loans Stock, Bank where Transferable Order (Northern Ireland) 1925
No. 108	
No. 109	The Contributory Pensions (Requisition for Birth and Marriage Certificates) Regulations (Northern Ireland) 1925
No. 110 - 112	
No. 113	The Ulster Loans Stock Regulations (Northern Ireland) 1925
No. 114	The Salaries and Capitation Grants (Public Elementary Schools) Regulations (Northern Ireland) 1925
No. 115	The Elementary Education (Pupil Teachers and Monitors) Amendment Regulations (Northern Ireland) 1925
No. 116	The Contributory Pensions (Procedure on References) Regulations (Northern Ireland) 1925
No. 117	The Contributory Pensions (Joint Committee) Regulations (Northern Ireland) 1925
No. 118	The Contributory Pensions (Workmen's Compensation Notification) Regulations (Northern Ireland) 1925
No. 119	
No. 120	The Contributory Pensions (Verification of Births, etc.) Regulations (Northern Ireland) 1925
No. 121	The Housing Grant Rules (Northern Ireland) 1925
No. 122	
No. 123	The Rule Making Authorities (Statutory Rules) Order (Northern Ireland) 1925
No. 124	The National Health Insurance (Teachers) Order (Northern Ireland) 1925
No. 125	The National Health Insurance (Employment under Local and Public Authorities) Order (Northern Ireland) 1925
No. 126	The Employment under Local and Public Authorities Order (Northern Ireland) 1925
No. 127	The Unemployment Insurance (Employment under Local and Public Authorities) Order (No. 2) (Northern Ireland) 1925
No. 128 - 150	
No. 151	The Prolongation of Insurance Regulations (Northern Ireland) 1925
No. 152	
No. 153	The Land Values (Referee) Rules (Northern Ireland) 1925
No. 154	
No. 155	The Contributory Pensions (Collection of Contributions for Excepted Persons) Regulations (Northern Ireland) 1925
No. 156	The National Health Insurance and Contributory Pensions (Collection of Contributions) Amendment Regulations (Northern Ireland) 1925
No. 157	The Contributory Pensions (Exempt and Excepted Persons) Regulations (Northern Ireland) 1925
No. 158	The Contributory Pensions (Calculation of Contributions) Regulations (Northern Ireland) 1925
No. 159	The Contributory Pensions (Residential Qualifications) Regulations (Northern Ireland) 1925
No. 160	The Contributory Pensions (Claims and Payments) Regulations (Northern Ireland) 1925
No. 161	The Pharmacy and Poisons Order (Northern Ireland) 1925
No. 162 & 163	
No. 164	The Motor Car (Irish Circulation) Regulations (Northern Ireland) 1925
No. 165	The Colorado Beetle Order (Northern Ireland) 1925
No. 166	
No. 167	The Public Records, Disposal of Documents Order (Northern Ireland) 1925
No. 168	The Public Health (Dried Milk) Regulations (Northern Ireland) 1925
No. 169	The Public Health (Condensed Milk) Regulations (Northern Ireland) 1925
No. 170	The Public Records, Certified Imperial Records Order (Northern Ireland) 1925

== See also ==
- List of statutory rules of Northern Ireland
