= List of statutory rules and orders of Northern Ireland, 1945 =

This is an incomplete list of statutory rules and orders of Northern Ireland during 1946. Statutory rules and orders were the predecessor of statutory rules and they formed the secondary legislation of Northern Ireland between 1922 and 1973.

Number	Title
No. 1 - 3	
No. 4	The Railways (Annual Accounts and Returns) Order (Northern Ireland) 1945
No. 5	The Planning (Additional) Regulations (Northern Ireland) 1945
No. 6	The Public Utility Undertakings (Prevention of Publications) (Amendment) Order (Northern Ireland) 1945
No. 7 & 8	
No. 9	The Retail Coal Prices Order (Northern Ireland) 1945
No. 10	The Royal Ulster Constabulary (Women Members) Pay (Amendment) Order (Northern Ireland) 1945
No. 11	The Royal Ulster Constabulary (Women Members) Allowances Order (Northern Ireland) 1945
No. 12	The Royal Ulster Constabulary Pay (Amendment) Order (Northern Ireland) 1945
No. 13	The Coal Supply (Temporary Provisions) Order (Northern Ireland) 1945
No. 14	The Parliamentary Electors (War-Time Registration) Appointed Day Order (Northern Ireland) 1945
No. 15	The Public Elementary Schools Amendment No. 20 Regulations (Northern Ireland) 1945
No. 16	
No. 17	The Grass Seeds and Fertilisers Amendment Order (Northern Ireland) 1945
No. 18	The Housing Trust (Procedure) Regulations (Northern Ireland) 1945
No. 19	The Electoral Registration (No. 1) Regulations (Northern Ireland) 1945
No. 20	The Furniture (Control of Manufacture and Supply) Order (Northern Ireland) 1945
No. 21	The Housing (Requisitioning of Premises) (Finance) Regulations (Northern Ireland) 1945
No. 22	
No. 23	The Petty Sessions (District and Times) Order (Northern Ireland) 1945
No. 24	The Public Utility Undertakings (Prevention of Publications) Amendment (No. 2) Order (Northern Ireland) 1945
No. 25	The Parliamentary Grant (Education Authorities) Regulations (Northern Ireland) 1945
No. 26	The Tillage Amendment Order (Northern Ireland) 1945
No. 27	The Conditions of Employment and National Arbitration (Amendment) Order (Northern Ireland) 1945
No. 28	The Bee Pest Prevention Regulations (Northern Ireland) 1945
No. 29	The Utility Furniture (Supply and Acquisition) (Amendment) Order (Northern Ireland) 1945
No. 30	
No. 31	The Contributory Pensions (Isle of Man Reciprocal Arrangements) Regulations (Northern Ireland) 1945
No. 32	
No. 33	The Nursery Schools Amendment No. 3 Regulations (Northern Ireland) 1945
No. 34	The Waste of Fuel Order (Northern Ireland) 1945
No. 35	The Ministries (Transfer of Drainage Functions) Order (Northern Ireland) 1945
No. 36 & 37	
No. 38	The Road Vehicles (Registration and Licensing) (Amendment) Regulations (Northern Ireland) 1945
No. 39	The Electoral Registration (Amendment) Regulations (Northern Ireland) 1945
No. 40	The Road Vehicles Licensing (Leave Permit) (Amendment) Regulations (Northern Ireland) 1945
No. 41	The Electric Accumulator Special Regulations (Northern Ireland) 1945
No. 42	The Local Carriers' Regulations (Northern Ireland) 1945
No. 43	The Northern Ireland Loans Stock Warrant (Northern Ireland) 1945
No. 44	The Northern Ireland Loans Stock (Rate of Dividends and Redemption) Regulations (Northern Ireland) 1945
No. 45	The Ulster Loans 4 1/2% Stock (Redemption and Conversion) Regulations (Northern Ireland) 1945
No. 46 & 47	
No. 48	The Royal Ulster Constabulary Pay (Amendment) (No. 2) Order (Northern Ireland) 1945
No. 49	
No. 50	The Scutch Mills and Flax (Fire Insurance) Regulations (Northern Ireland) 1945
No. 51	
No. 52	The Railway Companies (Accounts and Returns) Order (Northern Ireland) 1945
No. 53	The Unemployment Insurance (Emergency Powers) (Excepted Employments) Amendment Regulations (Northern Ireland) 1945
No. 54	The National Health Insurance (Medical Benefit) Amendment Regulations (Northern Ireland) 1945
No. 55 & 56	
No. 57	The Factories (Glass Protection) (Revocation) Order (Northern Ireland) 1945
No. 58	The Parliamentary Elections (Returning Officers' Charges) Regulations (Northern Ireland) 1945
No. 59	The Parliamentary Writs (House of Commons of Northern Ireland) Order (Northern Ireland) 1945
No. 60	The Importation of Plants (Amendment) Order (Northern Ireland) 1945
No. 61	The Ryegrass Seed (Control) Order (Northern Ireland) 1945
No. 62	The Ryegrass (Control of Harvesting) Order (Northern Ireland) 1945
No. 63	
No. 64	The Medicines, Pharmacy and Poisons (Appointed Days) Order (Northern Ireland) 1945
No. 65	
No. 66	The Factories (Forms and Particulars) Order (Northern Ireland) 1945
No. 67	The Parliamentary Elections (Returning Officers' Charges) Regulations (Northern Ireland) 1945
No. 68	The Emergency Powers (Defence) (County Antrim and County Down) (Ballydrain Speed Limit) (Northern Ireland) Order 1945
No. 69	The Excessive Rents (Prevention) County Court Rules (Northern Ireland) 1945
No. 70	The Housing (Requisitioning of Premises) County Court Rules (Northern Ireland) 1945
No. 71	The Sale of Ice-Cream Regulations (Northern Ireland) 1945
No. 72	The National Fire Service (General) Regulations (Northern Ireland) 1945
No. 73	The Location of Industry (Restriction) Order (Northern Ireland) 1945
No. 74 - 76	
No. 77	The Prevention of Fraud (Investments) Rules with respect to conduct of Business of Licensed Dealers (Northern Ireland) 1945
No. 78	The Restriction of Traffic (Goods Vehicle) (Co. Antrim) (Revocation) Order (Northern Ireland) 1945
No. 79	
No. 80	The Intoxicating Liquor (Compensation Charges) Order (Northern Ireland) 1945
No. 81	The Restriction of Traffic (Goods Vehicle) (Co. Down) (Revocation) Order (Northern Ireland) 1945
No. 82	The Restriction of Traffic (Goods Vehicle) (Co. Tyrone) (Revocation) Order (Northern Ireland) 1945
No. 83	The Restriction of Traffic (Goods Vehicle) (Co. Londonderry) (Revocation) Order (Northern Ireland) 1945
No. 84	The Motor Vehicles Licences: Harvesting Operations Concession Order (Northern Ireland) 1945
No. 85	The Motor Vehicles (Restriction of Use) (Revocation) Order (Northern Ireland) 1945
No. 86	
No. 87	The Sheep Dipping (Special Regulations) Order (Northern Ireland) 1945
No. 88	The Control of Building Operations Order (Northern Ireland) 1945
No. 89	The Lifting of Potatoes (Prohibition) Order (Northern Ireland) 1945
No. 90	
No. 91	The Marketing of Fruit (Amendment) Rules (Northern Ireland) 1945
No. 92	The Acquisition and Disposal of Motor Vehicles (Revocation) Order (Northern Ireland) 1945
No. 93	The Public Elementary Schools Amendment No. 21 Regulations (Northern Ireland) 1945
No. 94	The Public Elementary Schools (Teachers' War Service) Amendment No. 5 Regulations (Northern Ireland) 1945
No. 95	The Pre-Cast Building Units Order (Northern Ireland) 1945
No. 96	The Pharmaceutical Society of Northern Ireland (Registration) Regulations (Northern Ireland) 1945
No. 97	The Drainage (Postponement of Prescribed Date) Order (Northern Ireland) 1945
No. 98	
No. 99	The Disabled Persons (Employment) (Appointed Day) Order (Northern Ireland) 1945
No. 100	The Government Loans Act (Date of Commencement) Order (Northern Ireland) 1945
No. 101	The Government Loans (Local Authorities' Fees) Regulations (Northern Ireland) 1945
No. 102	The Local Authorities Loans (Exemption) Regulations (Northern Ireland) 1945
No. 103	The Potato Records Eelworm Order (Northern Ireland) 1945
No. 104	
No. 105	The Emergency Powers (Defence) (Co. Down Speed Limit) (Revocation) Order (Northern Ireland) 1945
No. 106	The Road Vehicles (Prohibition of Camouflage) (Revocation) Order (Northern Ireland) 1945
No. 107	The Ulster Savings Certificates (Sixth Issue) Regulations (Northern Ireland) 1945
No. 108	The Disabled Persons (Registration) Regulations (Northern Ireland) 1945
No. 109	The Disabled Persons (District Advisory Committees and Panels) (Procedure) Regulations (Northern Ireland) 1945
No. 110	The Planning Schemes (Procedure) Regulations (Northern Ireland) 1945
No. 111	
No. 112	The Disabled Persons (Non-British Subjects) Regulations (Northern Ireland) 1945
No. 113	The Electricity (Factories Act) Special Regulations (Northern Ireland) 1945
No. 114	The Unemployment Insurance (Insurance Industry Special Scheme) (Amendment) Order (Northern Ireland) 1945
No. 115	The Unemployment Insurance (Anomalies) (Amendment) Regulations (Northern Ireland) 1945
No. 116	The Safe Milk Order (Northern Ireland) 1945
No. 117	The Royal Ulster Constabulary Pay (Amendment) (No. 3) Order (Northern Ireland) 1945
No. 118	The Royal Ulster Constabulary (Women Members) Pay (Amendment) (No. 3) Order (Northern Ireland) 1945
No. 119	
No. 120	The Tillage General Order (Northern Ireland) 1945
No. 121	
No. 122	The Furniture (Control of Manufacture and Supply) (No. 2) Order (Northern Ireland) 1945
No. 123	The Bacon Industry (Pig Nutrition Research Grant) Order (Northern Ireland) 1945
No. 124	The Horticultural (Glasshouse Cropping) (Revocation) Order (Northern Ireland) 1945
No. 125	The Exported Animals (Compensation) (Suspension of Charges) Order (Northern Ireland) 1945
No. 126	The Coal Supply (Temporary Provisions) (Amendment) (No. 8) Order (Northern Ireland) 1945
No. 127	The Factories (Forms and Particulars) (No. 2) Order (Northern Ireland) 1945
No. 128	The Housing (Management of Accommodation) Regulations (Northern Ireland) 1945
No. 129	The Prevention of Fraud (Investments) Appointed Day Order (Northern Ireland) 1945
No. 130	The Prevention of Fraud (Investments) Act Licensing Regulations (Northern Ireland) 1945
No. 131	The Factories (Weekly Hours of Young Persons) Regulations (Northern Ireland) 1945
No. 132 & 133	
No. 134	The Motor Cars (Use and Construction) (Amendment) Regulations (Northern Ireland) 1945
No. 135	The Police (Employment and Offences) (Revocation) Order (Northern Ireland) 1945
No. 136	The Contributory Pensions (Emergency Provisions) Regulations (Northern Ireland) 1945
No. 137	The County Officers and Courts (County Court Judge of Tyrone: Additional Duties) Order (Northern Ireland) 1945
No. 138	The Family Allowances (Appointed Days) Order (Northern Ireland) 1945
No. 139	The Wages Councils and Commissions of Inquiry (Notices and Orders) Regulations (Northern Ireland) 1945

== See also ==
- List of statutory rules of Northern Ireland
