= List of statutory rules and orders of Northern Ireland, 1933 =

This is an incomplete list of statutory rules and orders of Northern Ireland during 1933. Statutory rules and orders were the predecessor of statutory rules and they formed the secondary legislation of Northern Ireland between 1922 and 1973.

| Number | Title |
|---|---|
| No. 1 - 3 | |
| No. 4 | The company: Payment of Fees Regulations (Northern Ireland) 1933 |
| No. 5 | |
| No. 6 | The Gas: Rate of Payment Order (Northern Ireland) 1933 |
| No. 7 - 10 | |
| No. 11 | The Civil Authorities (Special Powers) Regulations (Northern Ireland) 1933 |
| No. 12 | |
| No. 13 | The Fisheries By-Laws (Northern Ireland) 1933 |
| No. 14 - 16 | |
| No. 17 | The Marketing of Eggs Rules (Northern Ireland) 1933 |
| No. 18 | The Marketing of Potatoes Rules (Northern Ireland) 1933 |
| No. 19 & 20 | |
| No. 21 | The Motor Vehicles (International Circulation) Regulations (Northern Ireland) 1933 |
| No. 22 | |
| No. 23 | The Secondary School Examinations Amendment Regulations No. 2 (Northern Ireland) 1933 |
| No. 24 | The Staffing Public Elementary Schools Amendment Regulations No. 4 (Northern Ireland) 1933 |
| No. 25 & 26 | |
| No. 27 | The Petroleum-Spirit (Conveyance) Regulations (Northern Ireland) 1933 |
| No. 28 | The Technological Scholarship Amendment Regulations No. 1 (Northern Ireland) 1933 |
| No. 29 | The Exchequer BorRecording and Local Loans Order (Northern Ireland) 1933 |
| No. 30 | The Ulster 3% per cent. Stock Regulations (Northern Ireland) 1933 |
| No. 31 - 33 | |
| No. 34 | The Port Sanitary Regulations (Northern Ireland) 1933 |
| No. 35 | The Education (Representatives on School Management Committees) Regulations (Northern Ireland) 1933 |
| No. 36 | The Weights and Measures (Local Authorities) Fees Order (Northern Ireland) 1933 |
| No. 37 | |
| No. 38 | The Ulster Savings Certificates (Sinking Fund) Regulations (Northern Ireland) 1933 |
| No. 39 | The Church Temporalities Sinking Fund Regulations (Northern Ireland) 1933 |
| No. 40 & 41 | |
| No. 42 | The Road Vehicles (Traffic) Regulations (Northern Ireland) 1933 |
| No. 43 | |
| No. 44 | The Secondary Teachers Amendment Regulations No. 3 (Northern Ireland) 1933 |
| No. 45 | |
| No. 46 | The Musk Rats Order (Northern Ireland) 1933 |
| No. 47 | |
| No. 48 | The Unemployment Insurance (Insurance Year) Regulations (Northern Ireland) 1933 |
| No. 49 | The Unemployment Insurance (Transitional Payments) (Amendment) Regulations (Northern Ireland) 1933 |
| No. 50 | The Tuberculosis (Procedure of Committees) Order (Northern Ireland) 1933 |
| No. 51 | |
| No. 52 | The Motor Cars (Third Party Risks) Regulations (Northern Ireland) 1933 |
| No. 53 | The Portal Inspection No. 3 Order (Northern Ireland) 1933 |
| No. 54 & 55 | |
| No. 56 | The Sanitary Sub-Officers Appointments Order (Northern Ireland) 1933 |
| No. 57 | |
| No. 58 | The Ulster Savings Certificates (Amendment) Regulations (Northern Ireland) 1933 |
| No. 59 | Clay Works Welfare Order (Northern Ireland) 1933 |
| No. 60 | |
| No. 61 | The Public Health (Prevention of Contamination of Food) (Belfast) Regulations (Northern Ireland) 1933 |
| No. 62 & 63 | |
| No. 64 | The Pensions (Increase) Regulations (Northern Ireland) 1933 |
| No. 65 | The Instruction of Public Elementary School Pupils in Extra and Special Subjects, No. 1 Amendment Regulations (Northern Ireland) 1933 |
| No. 66 | The National Health Insurance (Disposal of Balances) Amendment Regulations (Northern Ireland) 1933 |
| No. 67 | The Royal Ulster Constabulary Reward Fund (Amendment) Regulations (Northern Ireland) 1933 |
| No. 68 | The National Health Insurance and Contributory Pensions (Collection of Contributions) Amendment Regulations (Northern Ireland) 1933 |
| No. 69 | The Road Vehicles (Comber) Regulations (Northern Ireland) 1933 |
| No. 70 | The Live Stock Breeding Act (Northern Ireland) 1922 (Application to Boars) Order (Northern Ireland) 1933 |
| No. 71 | The Live Stock (Boars) Breeding (Northern Ireland) Rules (Northern Ireland) 1933 |
| No. 72 & 73 | |
| No. 74 | The Public Health (Imported Food) Amendment Regulations (Northern Ireland) 1933 |
| No. 75 | The Black Scab in Potatoes Order (Northern Ireland) 1933 |
| No. 76 | The Petroleum Spirit (Conveyance) Regulations (Northern Ireland) 1933 |
| No. 77 | |
| No. 78 | The Electricity (Arbitrator's Award) Regulations (Northern Ireland) 1933 |
| No. 79 | The Unemployment Insurance (Insurance Year) (No. 2) Regulations (Northern Ireland) 1933 |
| No. 80 | The Civil Authorities (Special Powers) Prohibition of Assemblies Regulations (Northern Ireland) 1933 |
| No. 81 | The Destructive Insects and Pests Order (Northern Ireland) 1933 |
| No. 82 | The Importation of Plants Order (Northern Ireland) 1933 |
| No. 83 | The Public Service Vehicles (Construction) (Amendment) Regulations (Northern Ireland) 1933 |
| No. 84 | The Probate: County Court Rules (Northern Ireland) 1933 |
| No. 85 | The Education: Training of Teachers Minute (Northern Ireland) 1933 |
| No. 86 | The Agricultural Marketing (Public Inquiry) Regulations (Northern Ireland) 1933 |
| No. 87 | The National Health Insurance (Deposit Contributors) Amendment Regulations (Northern Ireland) 1933 |
| No. 88 | The Civil Authorities (Special Powers) Unlawful Associations Regulations (Northern Ireland) 1933 |
| No. 89 | The Intoxicating Liquor: Licences: Rates of Charges Order (Northern Ireland) 1933 |
| No. 90 | |
| No. 91 | The Petty Sessions Clerks' Order (Northern Ireland) 1933 |
| No. 92 | |
| No. 93 | The Pigs Marketing Scheme (Approval) Order (Northern Ireland) 1933 |
| No. 94 | |
| No. 95 | The Sheep Dipping (Special Regulations) Order (Northern Ireland) 1933 |
| No. 96 | The Marketing of Fruit Rules (Northern Ireland) 1933 |
| No. 97 | |
| No. 98 | The Contributory Pensions (Exempt and Excepted Persons) Amendment Regulations (Northern Ireland) 1933 |
| No. 99 | The Bacon Marketing Scheme (Approval) Order (Northern Ireland) 1933 |
| No. 100 | |
| No. 101 | The Moneylenders (Summary Jurisdiction) Rules (Northern Ireland) 1933 |
| No. 102 & 103 | |
| No. 104 | The Ulster Savings Certificates (Amendment) (No. 2) Regulations (Northern Ireland) 1933 |
| No. 105 | The Malone Training School (Contributions) Regulations (Northern Ireland) 1933 |
| No. 106 | The Poultry Diseases Order (Northern Ireland) 1933 |
| No. 107 | The National Health Insurance (Subsidiary Employments) Amendment Order (Northern Ireland) 1933 |
| No. 108 | The Unemployment Insurance (Subsidiary Employments) Amendment Order (Northern Ireland) 1933 |
| No. 109 | The Technical School Examinations Regulations (Northern Ireland) 1933 |
| No. 110 | The Civil Authorities (Special Powers) : Examination of Witnesses by Magistrates Regulations (Northern Ireland) 1933 |
| No. 111 | The National Health Insurance (Insurance Practitioners and Pharmaceutical Cttees) Amendment Regulations (Northern Ireland) 1933 |
| No. 112 | The Stormont Estate Regulations (Northern Ireland) 1933 |
| No. 113 | The Unemployment Insurance (Anomalies) (Amendment) Regulations (Northern Ireland) 1933 |
| No. 114 | The Importation of Elm Trees and Conifers (Prohibition) Order (Northern Ireland) 1933 |
| No. 115 & 116 | |
| No. 117 | The Moneylenders (Body Corporate) Regulations (Northern Ireland) 1933 |
| No. 118 & 119 | |
| No. 120 | The Agricultural Marketing (Modification of Enactments) Order (Northern Ireland) 1933 |
| No. 121 | The Sanitary Sub-Officers Appointments (Amendment) Order (Northern Ireland) 1933 |
| No. 122 | The Sea-fishing Industry (Immature Sea-fish) Order (Northern Ireland) 1933 |
| No. 123 | |
| No. 124 | The Local Government (Finance) Regulations (Northern Ireland) 1933 |
| No. 125 | |
| No. 126 | The Housing Grant Rules (Northern Ireland) 1933 |
| No. 127 | The Civil Authorities: Special Powers: Republican Flag Regulations (Northern Ireland) 1933 |
| No. 128 | The Black Scab in Potatoes Order (Northern Ireland) 1933 |
| No. 129 | The Administrative Provisions (Ordnance Survey) Order (Northern Ireland) 1933 |
| No. 130 | The Contributory Pensions (Great Britain Reciprocal Arrangements) Regulations (Northern Ireland) 1933 |
| No. 131 | The Parliamentary Grant (Education Authorities) Regulations (Northern Ireland) 1933 |
| No. 132 | The National Health Insurance (Dental Benefit) Regulations (Northern Ireland) 1933 |

== See also ==
- List of statutory rules of Northern Ireland
