= List of statutory rules and orders of Northern Ireland, 1927 =

This is an incomplete list of statutory rules and orders of Northern Ireland during 1927. Statutory rules and orders were the predecessor of statutory rules and they formed the secondary legislation of Northern Ireland between 1922 and 1973.

Number	Title
No. 1 & 2	
No. 3	The Gas, Rate of payment to Ministry of Commerce Order (Northern Ireland) 1927
No. 4 & 5	
No. 6	The Ulster Savings Certificates Regulations (Northern Ireland) 1927
No. 7 - 11	
No. 12	The Rates of Interest (Housing) Order (Northern Ireland) 1927
No. 13	
No. 14	The Labourers Order (Northern Ireland) 1927
No. 15	The Drainage, Assessment of Lands Regulations (Northern Ireland) 1927
No. 16	The Royal Ulster Constabulary Allowances (Amendment) Order (Northern Ireland) 1927
No. 17	The Importation of Elm Trees (Prohibition) Order (Northern Ireland) 1927
No. 18	The Public Health (Preservatives, &c., in Food) Regulations (Northern Ireland) 1927
No. 19	The Jury Laws Amendment Act Order (Northern Ireland) 1927
No. 20	The Jury Laws Amendment Act Order (Northern Ireland) 1927
No. 21	
No. 22	The Trade Scholarships Regulations (Northern Ireland) 1927
No. 23	
No. 24	The Payment of Grants to Preparatory, Intermediate and Secondary Schools Amendment Regulations (Northern Ireland) 1927
No. 25	The Technological Scholarship Regulations (Northern Ireland) 1927
No. 26	The Secondary Teachers (Northern Ireland) 1926, Amendment Regulations No. 1 (Northern Ireland) 1927
No. 27	The Weights and Measures, Extension Regulations (Northern Ireland) 1927
No. 28 - 30	
No. 31	The Education, Teachers Superannuation Regulations (Northern Ireland) 1927
No. 32	The National Health Insurance (Investment Account) Regulations (Northern Ireland) 1927
No. 33	
No. 34	The Prisons, Ordinary and Convict Rules (Northern Ireland) 1927
No. 35 & 36	
No. 37	The Performing Animals Rules (Northern Ireland) 1927
No. 38	The Transmit of Animals Order (Northern Ireland) 1927
No. 39	
No. 40	The Salaries and Capitation Grants (Public Elementary Schools) 1925, Amendment Regulations No. 1 (Northern Ireland) 1927
No. 41	
No. 42	The Trade Boards (Tobacco) (Constitution, Proceedings and Meetings) Regulations (Northern Ireland) 1927
No. 43	
No. 44	The Ancient Monuments, Archaeological Objects Regulations (Northern Ireland) 1927
No. 45 - 48	
No. 49	The Poor Law Dispensaries (Northern Ireland) 1927
No. 50	The National Health Insurance (Deposit Contributors) Regulations (Northern Ireland) 1927
No. 51	The National Health Insurance (Arrears) Amendment Regulations (Northern Ireland) 1927
No. 52	The Animals Disinfection Order (Northern Ireland) 1927
No. 53	The Salaries and Capitation Grants (Compensated Model School Teachers) Regulations (Northern Ireland) 1927
No. 54	
No. 55	The Acquisition of Land (Assessment of Compensation) Fees Rules (Northern Ireland) 1927
No. 56	
No. 57	The Motor Car (Licensing of Drivers) Regulations (Northern Ireland) 1927
No. 58	The Civil Service Superannuation Order (Northern Ireland) 1927
No. 59	The Motor Car (Licensing of Drivers) Order (Northern Ireland) 1927
No. 60	
No. 61	The Compensated Model School Teachers' Superannuation Scheme (Northern Ireland) 1927
No. 62	The Education (Religious Instruction) Regulations (Northern Ireland) 1927
No. 63	The Land Purchase (Holdings) Rules (Northern Ireland) 1927
No. 64	The Woodworking Machinery (Amendment) Regulations (Northern Ireland) 1927
No. 65	
No. 66	The National Health Insurance (Small Societies Valuation Deficiencies) Regulations (Northern Ireland) 1927
No. 67	The National Health Insurance (Insurance Committees) (Amendment) Regulations (Northern Ireland) 1927
No. 68	The Training College Teachers' Superannuation Scheme (Northern Ireland) 1927
No. 69	The Public Health (Preservatives, &c., in Food) Amendment Regulations (Northern Ireland) 1927
No. 70 & 71	
No. 72	The Ulster Loans Stock, Warrant Creating Regulations (Northern Ireland) 1927
No. 73	The Ulster Loans Stock, Dividends and Redemption Regulations (Northern Ireland) 1927
No. 74	The Local Authorities (Parliamentary Grants) Regulations (Northern Ireland) 1927
No. 75	The Public Service Vehicles (Speed) Amendment Regulations (Northern Ireland) 1927
No. 76 & 77	
No. 78	The Lead Paint (Protection against Poisoning) Regulations (Northern Ireland) 1927
No. 79	The Lead Paint (Protection against Poisoning) Regulations (Northern Ireland) 1927
No. 80	The Contributory Pensions (Notification of Deaths and Marriages) Regulations (Northern Ireland) 1927
No. 81	The Motor Vehicles (Traffic and Regulations) Appointed day Order (Northern Ireland) 1927
No. 82	The National Health Insurance (Payments to Insurance Committees: Persons over 70) Regulations (Northern Ireland) 1927
No. 83	
No. 84	The Boiling of Imported Animal Food Order (Northern Ireland) 1927
No. 85	
No. 86	The Public Service Vehicles Regulations (Northern Ireland) 1927
No. 87	The Public Service Vehicles (Construction) Regulations (Northern Ireland) 1927
No. 88	The Prison Officers Superannuation Order (Northern Ireland) 1927
No. 89 - 91	
No. 92	The Conveyance of Live Poultry Order of 1919 Amendment Order (Northern Ireland) 1927
No. 93 & 94	
No. 95	The Importation of Potatoes (Malta and Canary Islands) Order (Northern Ireland) 1927
No. 96	The Sheep Dipping Order (Northern Ireland) 1927
No. 97	The Conveyance of Live Poultry Order of 1919 Amendment Order (Northern Ireland) 1927
No. 98	The Public Health (Preservatives, etc., in Food) Amendment No. 2 Regulations (Northern Ireland) 1927
No. 99 - 101	
No. 102	The Agricultural Development Fund Regulations (Northern Ireland) 1927
No. 103 & 104	
No. 105	The Workmen's Compensation (Industrial Diseases) Order (Northern Ireland) 1927
No. 106	The Exchequer Bank Order (Northern Ireland) 1927
No. 107	The Prisons, Females Sentenced to Penal Servitude Order (Northern Ireland) 1927
No. 108	The Prisons, Males Sentenced to Penal Servitude Order (Northern Ireland) 1927
No. 109	The Contributory Pensions (Calculation of Contributions) Regulations (Northern Ireland) 1927
No. 110	The Petty Sessions Clerk, Age Limit for Appointment Order (Northern Ireland) 1927
No. 111	The Petty Sessions Clerk Rules (Northern Ireland) 1927
No. 112	The Petty Sessions Clerk Assistants Rules (Northern Ireland) 1927
No. 113	The Motor Car (Licensing of Drivers) Amendment Regulations (Northern Ireland) 1927
No. 114	
No. 115	The Contributory Pensions (Claims and Payment) Regulations (Northern Ireland) 1927
No. 116	
No. 117	The Contributory Pensions (Residential Qualifications) Amendment Regulations (Northern Ireland) 1927
No. 118	The Parliamentary Grant (Education Authorities) Regulations (Northern Ireland) 1927
No. 119	The Parliamentary Grant (Education Authorities) Regulations (Northern Ireland) 1927
No. 120	The Collection in Streets Regulations (Northern Ireland) 1927
No. 121 & 122	
No. 123	The Pharmacy and Poisons Order (Northern Ireland) 1927
No. 124	The Royal Ulster Constabulary Pay (Amendment) Order (Northern Ireland) 1927
No. 125	
No. 126	The Royal Ulster Constabulary, Rule Making Authority Regulations (Northern Ireland) 1927
No. 127	The Dangerous Drugs Institutions Order (Northern Ireland) 1927
No. 128	The Bakehouses Welfare Order (Northern Ireland) 1927
No. 129	The Lead Paint Regulations (Northern Ireland) 1927
No. 130	The Malone Training School Regulations (Northern Ireland) 1927
No. 131	The National Health Insurance (Approved Societies) Amendment Regulations (Northern Ireland) 1927
No. 132	The Contributory Pensions (Exempt and Excepted Persons) Amendment Regulations (Northern Ireland) 1927
No. 133	The Secondary Teachers 1926, Amendment Regulations No. 2 (Northern Ireland) 1927
No. 134	The Technical Teachers 1926, Amendment Regulations No. 3 (Northern Ireland) 1927
No. 135 & 136	
No. 137	The Public Health (Preservatives etc., in Food) Amendment No. 3 Regulations (Northern Ireland) 1927
No. 138	The Sale of Diseased Plants Order (Northern Ireland) 1927
No. 139 - 141	
No. 142	The County Court Service, Conditions of Appointment Regulations (Northern Ireland) 1927
No. 143	The Compensated Model School Teachers' Superannuation (Amendment) Scheme (Northern Ireland) 1927
No. 144	The Public Service Vehicles (Construction) Amendment Regulations (Northern Ireland) 1927
No. 145	The Public Service Vehicles (Amendment) Regulations (Northern Ireland) 1927
No. 146	The Aldermen and Councillors of Borough Election Order (Northern Ireland) 1927
No. 147	The Destructive Insects and Pests Order 1922 Amendment Order (Northern Ireland) 1927
No. 148 & 149	
No. 150	The Sale of Milk (Special Designations) Regulations (Northern Ireland) 1927
No. 151	The Public Health (Condensed Milk) Amendment Regulations (Northern Ireland) 1927
No. 152	The Public Health (Dried Milk) Amendment Regulations (Northern Ireland) 1927

== See also ==
- List of statutory rules of Northern Ireland
