= List of statutory rules and orders of Northern Ireland, 1943 =

This is an incomplete list of statutory rules and orders of Northern Ireland during 1943. Statutory rules and orders were the predecessor of statutory rules and they formed the secondary legislation of Northern Ireland between 1922 and 1973.

Number	Title
No. 1 - 3	
3 No. 4	The National Fire Service (General) Regulations (Northern Ireland) 1943
3 No. 5	The Ulster Savings Certificates (Supplementary Issue) Regulations (Northern Ireland) 1943
3 No. 6	The Swine Fever (Emergency Sale) Order (Northern Ireland) 1943
3 No. 7	The Railways (Annual Accounts and Returns) Order (Northern Ireland) 1943
3 No. 8	The Fertilisers and Feeding Stuffs Amendment Order (Northern Ireland) 1943
3 No. 9	The Warble Fly (Dressing of Cattle) (Suspension) Order (Northern Ireland) 1943
3 No. 10	The Storage Facilities (Information) Order (Northern Ireland) 1943
3 No. 11	The Coal Supply, Temporary Provisions Order (Northern Ireland) 1943
3 No. 12	The Scutch Mills and Flax (Fire Insurance) Regulations (Northern Ireland) 1943
3 No. 13	The Unemployment Insurance (Emergency Powers) (Excepted Employments) Amendment Regulations (Northern Ireland) 1943
No. 14	
3 No. 15	The Loans Guarantee Suspense Account Regulations (Northern Ireland) 1943
3 No. 16	The Petty Sessions: Districts and Times Order (Northern Ireland) 1943
3 No. 17	The Agricultural Machinery (Control) Order (Northern Ireland) 1943
3 No. 18	The Northern Ireland 3 per cent. Loans Stock Regulations (Northern Ireland) 1943
3 No. 19	The Northern Ireland Loans Stock (Rate of Dividend and Redemption) Regulations (Northern Ireland) 1943
3 No. 20	The Northern Ireland Loans Stock (Creation of Two Million Pounds) Regulations (Northern Ireland) 1943
No. 21	
3 No. 22	The National Health Insurance (Dental Benefit) Amendment Regulations (Northern Ireland) 1943
3 No. 23	The Nursery Schools Amending No. 2 Regulations (Northern Ireland) 1943
3 No. 24	The Technical Teachers Amending No. 3 Regulations (Northern Ireland) 1943
3 No. 25	The Ulster 3 %. Stock (Redemption) and Northern Ireland 3 per cent. Loans Stock (Exchange) Regulations (Northern Ireland) 1943
3 No. 26	The National Health Insurance (Juvenile Deposit Contributors) Amendment Regulations (Northern Ireland) 1943
3 No. 27	The Poisons Order (Northern Ireland) 1943
3 No. 28	The Public Security (Church Bells) Order (Northern Ireland) 1943
3 No. 29	The Exported Animals (Compensation) Amendment Order (Northern Ireland) 1943
3 No. 30	The Dyeing and Cleaning (Direction) Order (Northern Ireland) 1943
No. 31	
3 No. 32	The Swine Fever (Emergency Sale) No. 2 Order (Northern Ireland) 1943
3 No. 33	The Food (Home GRecordn Grains) Direction (Northern Ireland) 1943
3 No. 34	The Venereal Diseases Rules (Northern Ireland) 1943
No. 35	
3 No. 36	The Public Security (Prohibition of Processions) (Amendment) Order (Northern Ireland) 1943
3 No. 37	The Contractors' Plant Order (Northern Ireland) 1943
No. 38	
3 No. 39	The Secondary Teachers Amending No. 4 Regulations (Northern Ireland) 1943
3 No. 40	The Contributory Pensions (Calculation of Contributions) Amendment Regulations (Northern Ireland) 1943
3 No. 41	The Emergency Powers (Defence) (County Londonderry) (Ballykelly Speed Limit) (Northern Ireland) Order 1943
3 No. 42	The Road Vehicles (Registration and Licensing) (Amendment) Regulations (Northern Ireland) 1943
No. 43 - 45	
3 No. 46	The Lifting of Potatoes (Prohibition) Order (Northern Ireland) 1943
3 No. 47	The Preparatory, Intermediate and Secondary School (Assignment of Teachers) Regulations (Northern Ireland) 1943
No. 48 & 49	
3 No. 50	The Public Security (Church Bells) (No. 2) Order (Northern Ireland) 1943
No. 51	
3 No. 52	The Food (Inspection of Undertakings) Order (Northern Ireland) 1943
3 No. 53	The Coal Supply Amendment (No. 1) Order (Northern Ireland) 1943
3 No. 54	The Londonderry Port and Harbour Commissioners (Postponement of Elections) (No. 3) Order (Northern Ireland) 1943
3 No. 55	The Belfast Harbour Commissioners (Postponement of Elections) (No. 3) Order (Northern Ireland) 1943
No. 56 & 57	
3 No. 58	The Vessels on Inland Waters Order (Northern Ireland) 1943
3 No. 59	The Motor Vehicles (Control) Order (Northern Ireland) 1943
3 No. 60	The National Health Insurance (Dental Benefit) Amendment (No. 2) Regulations (Northern Ireland) 1943
3 No. 61	The Civil Authorities (Special Powers) Regulations (Northern Ireland) 1943
3 No. 62	The Public Security (Church Bells) (Revocation) Order (Northern Ireland) 1943
3 No. 63	The Emergency Powers (Defence) (County Antrim) (Maghaberry Speed Limit) (Northern Ireland) Order 1943
3 No. 64	The Coal Supply Amendment (No. 2) Order (Northern Ireland) 1943
3 No. 65	The Control of High Frequency Apparatus Order (Northern Ireland) 1943
3 No. 66	The Ryegrass (Control of Harvesting) Order (Northern Ireland) 1943
3 No. 67	The National Fire Service (Financial) Regulations (Northern Ireland) 1943
3 No. 68	The Secondary Teachers Amending No. 5 Regulations (Northern Ireland) 1943
3 No. 69	The National Health Insurance and Contributory Pensions (Collection of Contributions) Amendment Regulations (Northern Ireland) 1943
3 No. 70	The Lifting of Potatoes (Prohibition) (No. 2) Order (Northern Ireland) 1943
3 No. 71	The Public Health (Dried and Condensed Milk) Regulations (Northern Ireland) 1943
3 No. 72	The Control of Employment (Directed Persons) Order (Northern Ireland) 1943
3 No. 73	The Public Elementary Schools Amending No. 16 Regulations (Northern Ireland) 1943
3 No. 74	The Conditions of Employment and National Arbitration (Amendment) Order (Northern Ireland) 1943
3 No. 75	The Unemployment Insurance (Emergency Powers) (Excepted Employments) Amendment (No. 2) Regulations (Northern Ireland) 1943
3 No. 76	The National Health Insurance (Medical Benefit) Amendment Regulations (Northern Ireland) 1943
3 No. 77	The Intoxicating Liquor - Licences - Rates of Charges Order (Northern Ireland) 1943
3 No. 78	The Sheep Dipping (Special Regulation) Order (Northern Ireland) 1943
3 No. 79	The Petroleum Spirit (Conveyance) Regulations (Northern Ireland) 1943
3 No. 80	The County Court Costs: Direction Framing the Scales (Northern Ireland) 1943
3 No. 81	The Hire-Purchase (County Court) Rules (Northern Ireland) 1943
3 No. 82	The Fees to be taken in the Civil Bill Courts in Northern Ireland Order (Northern Ireland) 1943
3 No. 83	The Control of Flax (Charges for Pulling) Order (Northern Ireland) 1943
3 No. 84	The Ryegrass Seed (Control) Order (Northern Ireland) 1943
3 No. 85	The Unemployment Insurance (Contributions) Amendment Regulations (Northern Ireland) 1943
3 No. 86	The Royal Ulster Constabulary (Non-application of Pay, etc., Orders to Women Members) Order (Northern Ireland) 1943
3 No. 87	The Secondary School Examinations Amending No. 4 Regulations (Northern Ireland) 1943
3 No. 88	The Wild Birds Protection Order (Northern Ireland) 1943
3 No. 89	The Conservators of Fisheries (Postponement of Elections) (No. 2) Order (Northern Ireland) 1943
3 No. 90	The Poisons Order (Northern Ireland) 1943
3 No. 91	The Oats (Control) (Restriction of Sales) (No. 3) Order (Northern Ireland) 1943
No. 92	
3 No. 93	The Public Security (Prohibition of Processions) (Revocation) Order (Northern Ireland) 1943
3 No. 94	The Petty Sessions Districts and Times Order (Northern Ireland) 1943
3 No. 95	The Workmen's Compensation (Examining Surgeons) Order (Northern Ireland) 1943
3 No. 96	The Unemployment Assistance (Determination of Need and Assessment of Needs) (Amendment) Regulations (Northern Ireland) 1943
3 No. 97	The National Health Insurance (Dental Benefit) Amendment No. 3 Regulations (Northern Ireland) 1943
No. 98 & 99	
3 No. 100	The Waste of Fuel Order (Northern Ireland) 1943
3 No. 101	The Resident Magistrates (Salaries and Allowances) Order (Northern Ireland) 1943
3 No. 102	The Determination of Needs (Blind Persons and Outdoor Relief) (Appointed Day) Order (Northern Ireland) 1943
3 No. 103	The Supplementary Pensions (Determination of Need and Assessment of Needs) (Amendment) Regulations (Northern Ireland) 1943
3 No. 104	The County Court Judge of Tyrone (Additional Duties) Order (Northern Ireland) 1943
No. 105	
3 No. 106	The Undertakings (Records and Information and Inspection of Premises) Order (Northern Ireland) 1943
No. 107	
3 No. 108	The Malone Training School Regulations (Northern Ireland) 1943
3 No. 109	The Ryegrass Seed (General Licence) Order (Northern Ireland) 1943
3 No. 110	The Trade Scholarships Regulations (Northern Ireland) 1943
3 No. 111	The Corn, Feeding Stuffs, Oat Products and Ryegrass Seed (Records and Returns) Order (Northern Ireland) 1943
3 No. 112	The Marketing of Fruit (Amendment) Rules (Northern Ireland) 1943
3 No. 113	The Poisons Order (Northern Ireland) 1943
No. 114 & 115	
3 No. 116	The National Health Insurance (Deposit Contributors Insurance Section) Amendment Regulations (Northern Ireland) 1943
3 No. 117	The Horticultural (Glasshouse Cropping) Order (Northern Ireland) 1943
3 No. 118	The Bricks (Control) Order (Northern Ireland) 1943
3 No. 119	The Unemployment Insurance (Emergency Powers) (Excepted Employments) Amendment (No. 3) Regulations (Northern Ireland) 1943
3 No. 120	The Petty Sessions Districts Order (Northern Ireland) 1943
3 No. 121	The Grass Seeds and Fertilisers Amendment Order (Northern Ireland) 1943
3 No. 122	The Tillage General Order (Northern Ireland) 1943
3 No. 123	The Bacon Industry (Pig Nutrition Research Grant) Order (Northern Ireland) 1943
3 No. 124	The Contractors' Plant (Control) Order (Northern Ireland) 1943
3 No. 125	The Road Vehicles (Index Marks) Regulations (Northern Ireland) 1943
3 No. 126	The Petty Sessions Districts and Times Order (Northern Ireland) 1943
3 No. 127	The Exported Animals (Compensation) (Suspension of Charges) Order (Northern Ireland) 1943
3 No. 128	The Royal Ulster Constabulary Pay (Amending) Order (Northern Ireland) 1943
3 No. 129	The Motor Vehicle Licences - Harvesting Operations Concession Order (Northern Ireland) 1943
No. 130 - 132	
3 No. 133	The Sand and Gravel (Returns) Order (Northern Ireland) 1943
3 No. 134	The Supplementary Pensions (Determinations) (Amendment) Rules (Northern Ireland) 1943
3 No. 135	The Unemployment Insurance (Contributions) Amendment No. 2 Regulations (Northern Ireland) 1943
No. 136	
3 No. 137	The Civil Authorities (Special Powers) Regulations (Northern Ireland) 1943
No. 138 & 139	
3 No. 140	The Supplementary Pensions (Determination of Need and Assessment of Needs) Regulations (Northern Ireland) 1943
3 No. 141	The Unemployment Insurance (Determination of Need and Assessment of Needs) Regulations (Northern Ireland) 1943
3 No. 142	The Motor Cars (Use and Construction) (Amendment) Regulations (Northern Ireland) 1943
3 No. 143	The Contributory Pensions (Voluntary Contributors) Amendment Regulations (Northern Ireland) 1943

== See also ==
- List of statutory rules of Northern Ireland
