= List of statutory rules and orders of Northern Ireland, 1941 =

This is an incomplete list of statutory rules and orders of Northern Ireland during 1940. Statutory rules and orders were the predecessor of statutory rules and they formed the secondary legislation of Northern Ireland between 1922 and 1973.

Number	Title
No. 1 & 2	
0 No. 3	The Swine Fever (Emergency Sale) Order (Northern Ireland) 1940
0 No. 4	The Defence (Agriculture and Fisheries) Regulations (Commencement) Order (Northern Ireland) 1940
0 No. 5	The County Councils (Officers Qualifications) Order (Northern Ireland) 1940
0 No. 6	The County Borough Councils (Town Clerks and Deputy Town Clerks Qualifications) Order (Northern Ireland) 1940
0 No. 7	The Unions and Rural District Councils (Officers' Qualifications) Order (Northern Ireland) 1940
0 No. 8	The Urban District Councils and Borough Councils (Officers Qualifications) Order (Northern Ireland) 1940
0 No. 9	The Unemployment Insurance (Emergency Powers) (Amendment) Regulations (Northern Ireland) 1940
0 No. 10	The Factories (Separation for Certain Purposes) Regulations (Northern Ireland) 1940
No. 11	
0 No. 12	The Belfast County Borough Council (Engineers' Qualifications) Order (Northern Ireland) 1940
0 No. 13	The Road Vehicles (Part-year Licensing) Order (Northern Ireland) 1940
0 No. 14	The Pigs Marketing Scheme (Amendment) Order (Northern Ireland) 1940
0 No. 15	The Public Elementary Schools (Evacuated Children) Regulations (Northern Ireland) 1940
0 No. 16	The Public Elementary School (Teachers' War Service) Regulations (Northern Ireland) 1940
0 No. 17	The Butter and Cream Marketing Scheme (Revocation) Order (Northern Ireland) 1940
0 No. 18	The Wild Birds (Protected) Order (Northern Ireland) 1940
0 No. 19	The Road Vehicles (Part Year Licensing) (Amendment) Order (Northern Ireland) 1940
0 No. 20	The Factories (Saturday Exception) Regulations (Northern Ireland) 1940
0 No. 21	The Public Elementary Schools (No. 11) Amendment Regulations (Northern Ireland) 1940
No. 22 & 23	
0 No. 24	The Explosives (Conveyance of Detonators) Order (Northern Ireland) 1940
0 No. 25	The Marketing of Eggs (Purchase by Contract) Rules (Northern Ireland) 1940
0 No. 26	The Bacon Industry (Curers' Levy) Regulations (Northern Ireland) 1940
0 No. 27	The Petroleum-Spirit (Conveyance) Regulations (Northern Ireland) 1940
0 No. 28	The National Health Insurance (Medical Benefit Council) (Amendment) Regulations (Northern Ireland) 1940
No. 29	
0 No. 30	The Technical Teachers' War Service Regulations (Northern Ireland) 1940
0 No. 31	The Preparatory and Secondary Teachers' War Service Regulations (Northern Ireland) 1940
0 No. 32	The Importation of Potatoes Order (Northern Ireland) 1940
No. 33	
0 No. 34	The Workmen's Compensation (Industrial Diseases) Order (Northern Ireland) 1940
0 No. 35	The Factories (Forms and Particulars) Order (Northern Ireland) 1940
No. 36	
0 No. 37	The Agricultural Wages (Benefits or Advantages) Regulations (Northern Ireland) 1940
0 No. 38	The Agricultural Wages (Notice of the fixing, cancelling or varying of Minimum Rates of Wages) Regulations (Northern Ireland) 1940
0 No. 39	The Unemployment Insurance (Increase of Benefit in respect of Dependent Children) Order (Northern Ireland) 1940
0 No. 40	The Unemployment Insurance (Emergency Powers) (Amendment) (No. 2) Regulations (Northern Ireland) 1940
0 No. 41	The Factories (Ventilation) Revocation Regulations (Northern Ireland) 1940
No. 42	
0 No. 43	The Anatomy Order (Northern Ireland) 1940
No. 44	
0 No. 45	The Pigs Marketing Scheme (Amendment) (No. 2) Order (Northern Ireland) 1940
0 No. 46	The Milk (Conditions of Delivery) Order (Northern Ireland) 1940
0 No. 47	The Importation of Plants (Amendment) Order (Northern Ireland) 1940
0 No. 48	The Unemployment Insurance (Emergency Powers) (Amendment) (No. 3) Regulations (Northern Ireland) 1940
0 No. 49	The Factories (Forms and Particulars) (No. 2) Order (Northern Ireland) 1940
0 No. 50	The Building Society Rules (Northern Ireland) 1940
0 No. 51	The Civil Authorities (Special Powers) (Documents of Identity) Regulations (Northern Ireland) 1940Not Allocated
0 No. 52	The Railways (Acquisition of Undertakings) (Extension of Period) Order (Northern Ireland) 1940
No. 53	
0 No. 54	The Civil Authorities (Special Powers) (Persons Entering Northern Ireland) Regulations (Northern Ireland) 1940
0 No. 55	The Queen's University of Belfast (Temporary Provisions) Order (Northern Ireland) 1940
0 No. 56	The Sheep Dipping (Special Regulations) Order (Northern Ireland) 1940
0 No. 57	The Marketing of Eggs Rules (Northern Ireland) 1940
0 No. 58	The Local Government (Finance) Regulations (Northern Ireland) 1940
0 No. 59	The Unemployment Insurance (Crediting of Contributions) (Amendment) Regulations (Northern Ireland) 1940
0 No. 60	The National Health Insurance (Medical Benefit) Amendment Regulations (Northern Ireland) 1940
0 No. 61	The Civil Authorities (Special Powers) (Persons Entering Northern Ireland) Regulations (Northern Ireland) 1940
0 No. 62	The Contributions Pensions (Joint Committee) Regulations (Northern Ireland) 1940
0 No. 63	The Public Security (Church Bells) Order (Northern Ireland) 1940
No. 64	
0 No. 65	The Repair of War Damage (Essential Plant) (Registration of Charges) Regulations (Northern Ireland) 1940
0 No. 66	The Lifting of Potatoes (Prohibition) Order (Northern Ireland) 1940
0 No. 67	The Malone Training School Regulations (Northern Ireland) 1940
No. 68	
0 No. 69	The Public Security (Prohibition of Processions) Order (Northern Ireland) 1940
0 No. 70	The Public Service Vehicles (Construction) (Amendment) Regulations (Northern Ireland) 1940
0 No. 71	
0 No. 72	The Motor Cars (Use and Construction) (Amendment) Regulations (Northern Ireland) 1940
0 No. 73	The Public Service Vehicles (Amendment) Regulations (Northern Ireland) 1940
0 No. 74	The Industrial Assurance Rules (Northern Ireland) 1940
0 No. 75	The Friendly Society Rules (Northern Ireland) 1940
0 No. 76	The Factories (Young Persons Under Sixteen - Hours Modification) Regulations (Northern Ireland) 1940
0 No. 77	The Exchequer BorRecording Regulations (Northern Ireland) 1940
0 No. 78	The Unemployment Insurance (Insurance Industry Special Scheme) (Amendment) Order (Northern Ireland) 1940
0 No. 79	The Public Security (Maps) Order (Northern Ireland) 1940
No. 80	
0 No. 81	The Public Health (Preservatives, etc. in Food) Amendment Regulations (Northern Ireland) 1940
0 No. 82	The Supplementary Pensions (Determination of Need and Assessment of Needs) Regulations (Northern Ireland) 1940
0 No. 83	The Milk (Grade A) Regulations (Northern Ireland) 1940
0 No. 84	The Milk (Grade B) Regulations (Northern Ireland) 1940
0 No. 85	The Milk (Grade C) Regulations (Northern Ireland) 1940
0 No. 86	The Unemployment Insurance (Emergency Powers) (Amendment) (No. 4) Regulations (Northern Ireland) 1940
0 No. 87	The Butter and Margarine (Sales) Regulations (Northern Ireland) 1940
0 No. 88	The Unemployment Insurance (Residence Condition) Regulations (Northern Ireland) 1940
0 No. 89	The Supplementary Pensions (Appeal Tribunals) Rules (Northern Ireland) 1940
No. 90	
0 No. 91	The Civil Defence (Specified Areas) Order (Northern Ireland) 1940
0 No. 92	The Civil Authorities (Special Powers) Interned Persons Regulations (Northern Ireland) 1940
0 No. 93	The Civil Defence (Revision of Code) Order (Northern Ireland) 1940
No. 94	
0 No. 95	The Belfast City and District Water Commissioners (Postponement of Elections) Order (Northern Ireland) 1940
0 No. 96	The Intoxicating Liquor (Licences) Rates of Charges Order (Northern Ireland) 1940
0 No. 97	The Ministry of Public Security (Transfer of Functions) Order (Northern Ireland) 1940
0 No. 98	The Ministry of Public Security (Adaptation of Enactments) Order (Northern Ireland) 1940
0 No. 99	The National Health Insurance (Subsidiary Employments) Amendment Order (Northern Ireland) 1940
0 No. 100	The Unemployment Assistance (Residence Qualification) Rules (Northern Ireland) 1940
0 No. 101	The Unemployment Insurance (Insurance Industry Special Scheme) (Amendment) (No. 2) Order (Northern Ireland) 1940
0 No. 102	The Teachers' (Public Elementary) Superannuation (Amendment) Scheme (Northern Ireland) 1940
0 No. 103	The Teachers' (Secondary and Preparatory) Superannuation (Amendment) Scheme (Northern Ireland) 1940
0 No. 104	The Teachers' (Agricultural and Technical) Superannuation (Amendment) Scheme (Northern Ireland) 1940
No. 105	
0 No. 106	
0 No. 107	The Unemployment Insurance (Emergency Powers) (Amendment) (No. 5) Regulations (Northern Ireland) 1940
0 No. 108	The Tillage General (No. 2) Order (Northern Ireland) 1940
0 No. 109	The Public Security (Clearance of Lofts) Order (Northern Ireland) 1940
0 No. 110	The Parliamentary Grant (Education Authorities) Regulations (Northern Ireland) 1940
No. 111	
0 No. 112	The Trade Boards (Holiday Period) Order (Northern Ireland) 1940
0 No. 113	The National Health Insurance and Contributory Pensions (Transitional) Regulations (Northern Ireland) 1940
0 No. 114	The Petty Sessions (Districts and Times) Order (Northern Ireland) 1940
0 No. 115	The Prisons: Appointment of for Particular Localities Order (Northern Ireland) 1940
0 No. 116	The Petty Sessions (Districts and Times) Order (Northern Ireland) 1940
No. 117	
0 No. 118	The Workmen's Compensation Rules (Northern Ireland) 1940
0 No. 119	The Agricultural Wages Board (Casual Vacancies) Regulations (Northern Ireland) 1940
0 No. 120	The Road Vehicles (Prohibition of Camouflage) Order (Northern Ireland) 1940
0 No. 121	The Civil Defence (Compulsory Area) Order (Northern Ireland) 1940
No. 122 - 138	
0 No. 139	The Public Security (Securing of Horses) Order (Northern Ireland) 1940
0 No. 140	The Conservators of Fisheries (Postponement of Elections) Order (Northern Ireland) 1940
No. 141 & 142	
0 No. 143	The Pig Industry Council (Casual Vacancies) Regulations (Northern Ireland) 1940
0 No. 144	The Pig Industry Council (Term and Conditions of Office of Members) (Amendment) Rules (Northern Ireland) 1940
0 No. 145	The Emergency Powers (Defence) Acquisition and Disposal of Motor Vehicles Order (Northern Ireland) 1940
0 No. 146	The Black Scab in Potatoes Order (Northern Ireland) 1940
0 No. 147	The Agricultural Wages Board (Representation of Employers in Agriculture and of Workers in Agriculture) Order (Northern Ireland) 1940
0 No. 148	The Unemployment Assistance (Determination of Need and Assessment of Needs) (Amendment) Regulations (Northern Ireland) 1940
No. 149	
0 No. 150	The Certificates of Births, Deaths and Marriages (Requisition) Regulations (Northern Ireland) 1940
No. 151	
0 No. 152	The Building and Improvement Grants (Voluntary Schools) Amendment (Emergency) Regulations (Northern Ireland) 1940
No. 153 & 154	
0 No. 155	The Public Security (Prohibition of Processions) (Amendment) Order (Northern Ireland) 1940
No. 156	
0 No. 157	The Civil Defence (Compulsory Area) (No. 2) Order (Northern Ireland) 1940
0 No. 158	The Public Security (Securing of Horses) (No. 2) Order (Northern Ireland) 1940
No. 159 & 160	
0 No. 161	The Factories (Weekly hours of Young Persons under sixteen in the Printing, Bookbinding and Allied Industries) Regulations (Northern Ireland) 1940
No. 162 & 163	
0 No. 164	The Civil Defence (Appeals) Rules (Northern Ireland) 1940
0 No. 165	The Air-Raid Precautions (Storage and Loan of Equipment) Regulations (Northern Ireland) 1940
0 No. 166	The Unemployment Insurance (Approval of Arrangements) Regulations (Northern Ireland) 1940
0 No. 167	The Contributory Pensions (Verification of Births, etc.) Regulations (Northern Ireland) 1940
0 No. 168	The Air Raid Precautions (Schemes) Regulations (Northern Ireland) 1940
0 No. 169	The Unemployment Insurance (Emergency Powers) (Amendment) (No. 6) Regulations (Northern Ireland) 1940
0 No. 170	The Markethill Quarter Sessions and Civil Bill Court Order (Northern Ireland) 1940
0 No. 171	The Unemployment Insurance (Subsidiary Employments) Regulations (Northern Ireland) 1940

== See also ==
- List of statutory rules of Northern Ireland
