= List of statutory rules and orders of Northern Ireland, 1926 =

This is an incomplete list of statutory rules and orders of Northern Ireland during 1926. Statutory rules and orders were the predecessor of statutory rules and they formed the secondary legislation of Northern Ireland between 1922 and 1973.

Number	Title
No. 1	
No. 2	The Factory and Workshop, Welfare Order (Northern Ireland) 1926
No. 3	The Intoxicating Liquor (Finance) Rules (Northern Ireland) 1926
No. 4	
No. 5	The Contributory Pensions (Requisition for Death Certificates) Regulations (Northern Ireland) 1926
No. 6	The National Health Insurance and Contributory Pensions (Voluntary Contributors) Regulations (Northern Ireland) 1926
No. 7 & 8	
No. 9	The Gas, Rate of payment to Ministry of Commerce Order (Northern Ireland) 1926
No. 10 & 11	
No. 12	The Agricultural and Technical Teachers Superannuation Scheme (Northern Ireland) 1926
No. 13 - 15	
No. 16	The Poisons, Free Distribution by Sanitary Authorities Order (Northern Ireland) 1926
No. 17	The Education, Secondary Teachers Regulations (Northern Ireland) 1926
No. 18 - 20	
No. 21	The Civil Bill Courts Fees Order (Northern Ireland) 1926
No. 22	The Parliamentary Grant in aid of Expenses of Education Regulations (Northern Ireland) 1926
No. 23	The Civil Service Superannuation Regulations (Northern Ireland) 1926
No. 24	The Payment of Attendance Grants to Technical Schools and Classes Regulations (Northern Ireland) 1926
No. 25 & 26	
No. 27	The Contributory Pensions (Workmen's Compensation Valuation) Regulations (Northern Ireland) 1926
No. 28	The Marketing of Eggs Rules (Northern Ireland) 1926
No. 29	The Contributory Pensions (Notification of Deaths and Marriages) Regulations (Northern Ireland) 1926
No. 30	The Payment of Grants to Preparatory, Intermediate and Secondary Schools Regulations (Northern Ireland) 1926
No. 31 - 34	
No. 35	The Trade Boards (Aerated Waters) (Constitution, Proceedings and Meetings) Regulations (Northern Ireland) 1926
No. 36	The Trade Board (Rope, Twine and Net) Regulations (Northern Ireland) 1926
No. 37 & 38	
No. 39	The Claims Tribunal Order (Northern Ireland) 1926
No. 40	The Live Stock Breeding Rules (Northern Ireland) 1926
No. 41	The Civil Bill Courts (Manner of Payment of Fees) Order (Northern Ireland) 1926
No. 42	
No. 43	The Emergency Powers Regulations (Northern Ireland) 1926
No. 44	The Technical Teachers Regulations (Northern Ireland) 1926
No. 45	The Extra and Special Subjects (Public Elementary Schools) Regulations (Northern Ireland) 1926
No. 46	The Labourers Cottages Order (Northern Ireland) 1926
No. 47	The Poisons and Pharmacy Regulations (Northern Ireland) 1926
No. 48	The Unemployment Insurance (Insurance Year) Regulations (Northern Ireland) 1926
No. 49	The Unemployment Insurance (Return of Contributions) Regulations (Northern Ireland) 1926
No. 50	The Education (School Attendance) Regulations (Northern Ireland) 1926
No. 51	The Wild Birds Protection Order (Northern Ireland) 1926
No. 52	The Wild Birds Protection Order (Northern Ireland) 1926
No. 53	The Contributory Pensions (Great Britain Reciprocal Arrangements) Regulations (Northern Ireland) 1926
No. 54 & 55	
No. 56	The Landing of Carcases Order (Northern Ireland) 1926
No. 57	The Contributory Pensions (Appropriation in Aid) Regulations (Northern Ireland) 1926
No. 58	
No. 59	The Contributory Pensions (Existing Widows and Orphans) Order (Northern Ireland) 1926
No. 60	The Unemployment Insurance (Collection of Contributions) (Amendment) Regulations (Northern Ireland) 1926
No. 61	
No. 62	The Wild Birds Protection Order (Northern Ireland) 1926
No. 63	
No. 64	The Marketing of Eggs. Amendment Rules (Northern Ireland) 1926
No. 65	The Arms and Ammunition Firearms Permits Order (Northern Ireland) 1926
No. 66	The Drainage (County Council Schemes) Regulations (Northern Ireland) 1926
No. 67 & 68	
No. 69	The Landing of Plants Order (Northern Ireland) 1926
No. 70	The Peat Moss Litter (Prohibition) Order (Northern Ireland) 1926
No. 71	The General Cattle Diseases Fund Regulations (Northern Ireland) 1926
No. 72	The Contributory Pensions (Approved Societies Returns) Regulations (Northern Ireland) 1926
No. 73 & 74	
No. 75	The Intoxicating Liquor: Licences charge Order (Northern Ireland) 1926
No. 76	The Public Elementary School Teachers' Superannuation Scheme (Northern Ireland) 1926
No. 77	The Teachers (Secondary and Preparatory) Superannuation (Amendment) Scheme (Northern Ireland) 1926
No. 78 - 82	
No. 83	The Unemployment Insurance (Insurance Industry Special Scheme) (Variation and Amendment) Special Order (Northern Ireland) 1926
No. 84	The Education (Returns of Births) Regulations (Northern Ireland) 1926
No. 85 - 87	
No. 88	The Grinding of Metals (Miscellaneous Industries) Regulations (Northern Ireland) 1926
No. 89 - 94	
No. 95	The Swine Fever Order (Northern Ireland) 1926
No. 96	
No. 97	The Drainage (Appeals to County Court) Regulations (Northern Ireland) 1926
No. 98	The Contributory Pensions (Modification of Old Age Pensions) Regulations (Northern Ireland) 1926
No. 99	
No. 100	The Parliamentary Grant in aid of Expenses of Education Amendment Regulations (Northern Ireland) 1926
No. 101	The School Fees Compensation (Education Authorities) Regulations (Northern Ireland) 1926
No. 102	The Education, Pupil Teachers and Monitors Regulations (Northern Ireland) 1926
No. 103	The Regulations for Technical Teachers, Northern Ireland, 1926, Amendment Regulations No. 1 (Northern Ireland) 1926
No. 104	The Parliamentary Grant (Education Authorities) Regulations (Northern Ireland) 1926
No. 105	The Contributory Pensions (Claims and Payments) Amendment Regulations (Northern Ireland) 1926
No. 106	The Trade Boards District Trade Committee (Boot and Shoe Repairing) Regulations (Northern Ireland) 1926
No. 107	The Docks Regulations (Northern Ireland) 1926
No. 108	The Contributory Pensions (Service Dependants Pensions) Regulations (Northern Ireland) 1926
No. 109	
No. 110	The National Health Insurance (Deposit Contributors) Amendment Regulations (Northern Ireland) 1926
No. 111	The Audit and Examination of Accounts Regulations (Northern Ireland) 1926
No. 112 & 113	
No. 114	The National Health Insurance (Teachers) Order (Northern Ireland) 1926
No. 115	The Contributory Pensions (Mercantile Marine) Order (Northern Ireland) 1926
No. 116	The Building Regulations (Northern Ireland) 1926
No. 117 & 118	
No. 119	The Public Service Vehicles (Speed) Regulations (Northern Ireland) 1926
No. 120	
No. 121	The Horse Breeding Rule (Northern Ireland) 1926
No. 122	The Horse Breeding Rules (Northern Ireland) 1926
No. 123	The Pharmacy and Poisons Regulations (Northern Ireland) 1926

== See also ==
- List of statutory rules of Northern Ireland
