= List of statutory rules and orders of Northern Ireland, 1934 =

This is an incomplete list of statutory rules and orders of Northern Ireland during 1934. Statutory rules and orders were the predecessor of statutory rules and they formed the secondary legislation of Northern Ireland between 1922 and 1973.

Number	Title
No. 1 - 3	
No. 4	The Mental Treatment Regulations (Northern Ireland) 1934
No. 5	The Civil Authorities: Special Powers: Explosive Substances Regulations (Northern Ireland) 1934
No. 6 - 8	
No. 9	The Pigs Marketing Scheme (Amendment) Order (Northern Ireland) 1934
No. 10	
No. 11	The Land Law (Miscellaneous Provisions) Rules (Northern Ireland) 1934
No. 12	The Local Conferences (Boroughs) Order (Northern Ireland) 1934
No. 13	The Local Conferences (Urban Districts) Order (Northern Ireland) 1934
No. 14	
No. 15	The Marketing of Dairy Produce Rules (Northern Ireland) 1934
No. 16	The Marketing of Pigs (Registration of Dealers) Regulations (Northern Ireland) 1934
No. 17	The National Health Insurance and Contributory Pensions (Voluntary Conts) Amendment Regulations (Northern Ireland) 1934
No. 18	The Drainage (Appeals to County Court) Regulations (Northern Ireland) 1934
No. 19	The Marketing of Pigs (Form of Dealers' Returns) Order (Northern Ireland) 1934
No. 20	The Housing (Advances) Rules (Northern Ireland) 1934
No. 21 - 23	
No. 24	The Marketing of Eggs (Amendment) Rules (Northern Ireland) 1934
No. 25	The Drainage (Notices to Cleanse Watercourses) Order (Northern Ireland) 1934
No. 26	The Parliamentary Grant (Education Authorities) Regulations (Northern Ireland) 1934
No. 27	The Agricultural Marketing (Removal of Pigs) Regulations (Northern Ireland) 1934
No. 28 & 29	
No. 30	The Secondary School Examinations Regulations, Amendment Regulations No. 3 (Northern Ireland) 1934
No. 31	The King's Scholarship Examinations Regulations (Northern Ireland) 1934
No. 32 & 33	
No. 34	The Road Vehicles (Traffic) (Amendment) Regulations (Northern Ireland) 1934
No. 35	The County Court Service: Transfers and Promotions Regulations (Northern Ireland) 1934
No. 36	The Teachers' Appointments in Provided and Transferred Public Elementary Schools Regulations (Northern Ireland) 1934
No. 37	The Docks Regulations (Northern Ireland) 1934
No. 38	
No. 39	The Sea-Fishing Industry (Immature Sea-Fish) Order (Northern Ireland) 1934
No. 40	The Public Elementary Schools Regulations (Northern Ireland) 1934
No. 41	The Fisheries: Trawling off Londonderry and Antrim Coasts By-Law (Northern Ireland) 1934
No. 42	The Public Bodies Order (Northern Ireland) 1934
No. 43	
No. 44	The Technical Attendance Grants Regulations (Northern Ireland) 1934
No. 45	
No. 46	The Meeting of Parents Regulations (Northern Ireland) 1934
No. 47	The Technical Teachers, 1932, Amendment Regulations No. 1 (Northern Ireland) 1934
No. 48	The Sheep Dipping (Special Regulation) Order (Northern Ireland) 1934
No. 49	The Agricultural Produce (Meat Regulation) Rules (Northern Ireland) 1934
No. 50	The Sheep Dipping (Local Regulations) Order (Northern Ireland) 1934
No. 51	The Unemployment (Extension of Enactments) Order (Northern Ireland) 1934
No. 52	
No. 53	The Mines (Working Facilities, Support, etc.) Rules (Northern Ireland) 1934
No. 54	The Local Government: Rural Districts Invested with Urban Powers Order (Northern Ireland) 1934
No. 55	The Petroleum Spirit (Conveyance) Regulations (Northern Ireland) 1934
No. 56	The National Health Insurance (Approved Societies) Amendment Regulations (Northern Ireland) 1934
No. 57	The Unemployment Insurance (Collection of Contributions) (Amendment) Regulations (Northern Ireland) 1934
No. 58	The Unemployment Insurance (Benefit) (Amendment) Regulations (Northern Ireland) 1934
No. 59	The Royal Ulster Constabulary Pay (Amendment) Order (Northern Ireland) 1934
No. 60	The Public Bodies (Amendment) Order (Northern Ireland) 1934
No. 61	The Electricity (Allocation of Cost of Production) Regulations (Northern Ireland) 1934
No. 62	The Milk (Equalisation Payments) Regulations (Northern Ireland) 1934
No. 63	The Unemployment Insurance (Joint Maintenance of Dependants) Regulations (Northern Ireland) 1934
No. 64	The Unemployment Insurance (Courts of Referees) (Amendment) Regulations (Northern Ireland) 1934
No. 65	The Unemployment Insurance (Associations) (Amendment) Regulations (Northern Ireland) 1934
No. 66	The Intoxicating Liquor: Licences: Rates of Charges Order (Northern Ireland) 1934
No. 67	The Unemployment Insurance (Benefit Miscellaneous Provisions) Regulations (Northern Ireland) 1934
No. 68	The Road Vehicles (Warrenpoint) Regulations (Northern Ireland) 1934
No. 69	The Milk (Grade A) Regulations (Northern Ireland) 1934
No. 70	The Milk (Grade B) Regulations (Northern Ireland) 1934
No. 71	The Milk (Grade C) Regulations (Northern Ireland) 1934
No. 72	The Unemployment Insurance (Insurance Industry Special Scheme) (Variation and Amendment) Order (Northern Ireland) 1934
No. 73	The Representation of the People Order (Northern Ireland) 1934
No. 74	The Marketing of Potatoes Rules (Northern Ireland) 1934
No. 75	The Poor Law: Dispensary Districts: Medical Officers Order (Northern Ireland) 1934
No. 76 & 77	
No. 78	The Contributory Pensions and Unemployment Insurance (Collection of Contributions for Persons Over 65) Amendment Regulations (Northern Ireland) 1934
No. 79	The Unemployment Insurance (Inconsiderable Employments) (Persons under Sixteen) Order (Northern Ireland) 1934
No. 80	
No. 81	The Malone Training School (Contributions) Regulations (Northern Ireland) 1934
No. 82	The Butter and Margarine (Sales) Regulations (Northern Ireland) 1934
No. 83	The Goods Vehicles Regulations (Northern Ireland) 1934
No. 84	The Marketing of Fruit Rules (Northern Ireland) 1934
No. 85	The Importation of Plants (Northern Ireland) (Amendment) Order (Northern Ireland) 1934
No. 86	
No. 87	The Motor Cars (Use and Construction) Regulations (Northern Ireland) 1934
No. 88	
No. 89	The Pigs Marketing Scheme (Northern Ireland) (Amendment) (No. 2) Order (Northern Ireland) 1934
No. 90	The Motor Vehicles (Summary Proceedings) Regulations (Northern Ireland) 1934
No. 91	The Road Vehicles (Antrim Speed Limit) Regulations (Northern Ireland) 1934
No. 92	The Slaughtered Animals (Compensation) Act (Northern Ireland) 1928 (Suspension of Charges) Order (Northern Ireland) 1934
No. 93	The Pigs Marketing (Special Levy) (No. 1) Order (Northern Ireland) 1934
No. 94	The Agricultural Marketing (Northern Ireland) (Compensation) Order (Northern Ireland) 1934
No. 95	The Motor Vehicles and Road Traffic Act: Date of Operation Order (Northern Ireland) 1934
No. 96	The Weights and Measures (Verification and Stamping Fees) Order (Northern Ireland) 1934
No. 97	The Motor Cars (Silence Zones) (Bangor and Portrush) Regulations (Northern Ireland) 1934
No. 98	
No. 99	The Motor Vehicles and Road Traffic Act: Date of Operation Order (Northern Ireland) 1934
No. 100	The Prosecutors' and Witnesses' Expenses Regulations (Northern Ireland) 1934
No. 101	The Pigs Marketing (Grading) Order (Northern Ireland) 1934
No. 102	The Agricultural Produce (Meat Regulation) Rules (Northern Ireland) No. 2 (Northern Ireland) 1934
No. 103	The Milk and Milk Products Act: Date of Operation Order (Northern Ireland) 1934
No. 104	The National Health Insurance (Deposit Contributors) Amendment Regulations (Northern Ireland) 1934
No. 105	The Railways (Notice of Accidents) Order (Northern Ireland) 1934
No. 106	The County Officers and Courts (Northern Ireland) Rules (Northern Ireland) 1934
No. 107	
No. 108	The Motor Vehicles and Road Traffic Act: Date of Operation Order (Northern Ireland) 1934
No. 109	The Motor Cars (Third Party Risks) Regulations (Northern Ireland) 1934
No. 110	The Certificates of Births, Deaths and Marriages (Requisition) Regulations (Northern Ireland) 1934
No. 111	The Certificates of Births, Deaths and Marriages (Requisition) Order (Northern Ireland) 1934
No. 112	The Census of Production (1936) Order (Northern Ireland) 1934
No. 113	
No. 114	The Milk and Milk Products Act: Date of Operation Order (Northern Ireland) 1934
No. 115	The Statutory Rules: Unemployment Assistance Board Regulations (Northern Ireland) 1934
No. 116	The St. Mary's Training College, Belfast, Superannuation Scheme (Northern Ireland) 1934
No. 117	The Local Government: Acceptance of Tenders Regulations (Northern Ireland) 1934
No. 118	The Contributory Pensions (Exempt and Excepted Persons) Amendment Regulations (Northern Ireland) 1934
No. 119	
No. 120	The Rates of Interest (Housing) Order (Northern Ireland) 1934
No. 121	The Butter and Margarine (Sales) (Amendment) Regulations (Northern Ireland) 1934
No. 122	The Pigs Marketing (Grading Fee) Order (Northern Ireland) 1934
No. 123	The Milk (Equalisation Payments) (Amendment) Regulations (Northern Ireland) 1934
No. 124	The Pigs Marketing (Special Levy) (No. 2) Order (Northern Ireland) 1934
No. 125	The Unemployment Assistance (Determination of Need and Assessment of Needs) Regulations (Northern Ireland) 1934
No. 126	The Unemployment Act 1934 (Appointed Days) Order (Northern Ireland) 1934
No. 127	The Pigs Marketing: Pig Industry: Appointed Day Order (Northern Ireland) 1934
No. 128	
No. 129	The National Health Insurance and Contributory Pensions (Coll. of Contributions) Amendment Regulations (Northern Ireland) 1934
No. 130	The Moneylenders: County Court Rules Order (Northern Ireland) 1934
No. 131	The Unemployment Insurance (Removal of Difficulties) Order (Northern Ireland) 1934

== See also ==
- List of statutory rules of Northern Ireland
