= List of statutory rules and orders of Northern Ireland, 1922 =

This is an incomplete list of statutory rules and orders of Northern Ireland during 1922. Statutory rules and orders were the predecessor of statutory rules and they formed the secondary legislation of Northern Ireland between 1922 and 1973.

Number	Title
No. 1	The Aerated Waters Trade Board (Northern Ireland) 1922
No. 2	The Boot and Shoe Repairing Trade Board (Northern Ireland) 1922
No. 3	The Brush and Broom Trade Board (Northern Ireland) 1922
No. 4	The Dressmaking and Women's Light Clothing Trade Board (Northern Ireland) 1922
No. 5	The General Waste Materials Reclamation Trade Board (Northern Ireland) 1922
No. 6	The Hat, Cap and Millinery Trade Board (Northern Ireland) 1922
No. 7	The Laundry Trade Board (Northern Ireland) 1922
No. 8	The Linen and Cotton Handkerchief and Household Goods and Linen Goods Trade Board (Northern Ireland) 1922
No. 9	The Linen and Cotton Embroidery Trade Board (Northern Ireland) 1922
No. 10	The Milk Distributive Trade Board (Northern Ireland) 1922
No. 11	The Paper Box Trade Board (Northern Ireland) 1922
No. 12	The Readymade and Wholesale Bespoke Tailoring Trade Board (Northern Ireland) 1922
No. 13	The Rope, Twine and Net Trade Board (Northern Ireland) 1922
No. 14	The Shirtmaking Trade Board (Northern Ireland) 1922
No. 15	The Sugar Confectionery and Food Preserving Trade Board (Northern Ireland) 1922
No. 16	The Tobacco Trade Board (Northern Ireland) 1922
No. 17	The Wholesale Mantle and Costume Trade Board (Northern Ireland) 1922
No. 18	The Road Vehicles (Part Year Licensing) Order (Northern Ireland) 1922
No. 19	The Arms and Ammunition Rules (Northern Ireland) 1922
No. 20 - 23	
No. 24	The Retail Bespoke Tailoring Trade Board (Northern Ireland) 1922
No. 25 - 27	
No. 28	The Rates of Interest (Housing) Order (Northern Ireland) 1922
No. 29	
No. 30	The Unemployment Insurance (Mercantile Marine) Special Order (Northern Ireland) 1922
No. 31	The Curfew Order (Northern Ireland) 1922
No. 32	The Stopping Up of Roads Order (Northern Ireland) 1922
No. 33	The Use of Premises for Discharge of Firearms, &c. Regulations (Northern Ireland) 1922
No. 34	The Arrest and Detention of Suspected Persons Regulations (Northern Ireland) 1922
No. 35	The Unlawful Associations Regulation (Northern Ireland) 1922
No. 36	The Stopping Up of Roads Regulations (Northern Ireland) 1922
No. 37	The Unauthorised Use of Uniform Regulation (Northern Ireland) 1922
No. 38	
No. 39	The Photos and Finger-prints Regulations (Northern Ireland) 1922
No. 40	The Acquisition of Land (Assessment of Compensation) Fees Rules (Northern Ireland) 1922
No. 41	The Detention of Suspected Persons and Removal of Prisoners Regulations (Northern Ireland) 1922
No. 42	The Prison Visiting Committee Order (Northern Ireland) 1922
No. 43 - 46	
No. 47	The National Health Insurance and Unemployed Insurance (Inspectors' Certificates) Regulations (Northern Ireland) 1922
No. 48	The Superannuation (Form of Declaration) (Northern Ireland) 1922
No. 49	The Flax and Hemp Trade Board (Northern Ireland) 1922
No. 50	The Electricity Special Order (Northern Ireland) 1922
No. 51	
No. 52	The Ulster Savings Certificates Regulations (Northern Ireland) 1922
No. 53	The Teachers' Salaries Grant Rules (Northern Ireland) 1922
No. 54	
No. 55	The Seeds Regulations (Northern Ireland) 1922
No. 56	The Registration of Lodgers and Inmates of Dwelling Houses in Specified Areas (Northern Ireland) 1922
No. 57	
No. 58	The Unemployment Insurance (Insurance Industry Special Scheme) (Amendment) Order (Northern Ireland) 1922
No. 59	
No. 60	The Treasury Bills (Preparation, Issue and Cancellation) Regulations (Northern Ireland) 1922
No. 61	The Royal Ulster Constabulary Reward Fund Regulations (Northern Ireland) 1922
No. 62	The Special Constabulary Reward Fund Regulations (Northern Ireland) 1922
No. 63	The Land Values (Referee) Rules (Northern Ireland) 1922
No. 64	The Acquisition of Land (Assessment of Compensation) Rules (Northern Ireland) 1922
No. 65	
No. 66	The Chemical Works Regulations (Northern Ireland) 1922
No. 67	The Royal Ulster Constabulary Allowances Order (Northern Ireland) 1922
No. 68	The Royal Ulster Constabulary Pay Order (Northern Ireland) 1922
No. 69	The Land Acts Assistant Commissioners Rule (Northern Ireland) 1922
No. 70	The Unemployment Insurance (Directions to Committee) (Amendment) Regulations (Northern Ireland) 1922
No. 71	The Urban District Councillors and Town Commissioners Election Order (Northern Ireland) 1922
No. 72	Woodworking Machines Regulations (Northern Ireland) 1922
No. 73	The Civil Authorities (Special Powers) Compensation Rules (Northern Ireland) 1922
No. 74	The Allegiance Declaration Order (Northern Ireland) 1922
No. 75	The Destructive Insects and Pests Order (Northern Ireland) 1922
No. 76	The Black Scab in Potatoes No. 3 Order (Northern Ireland) 1922
No. 77	The Sale of Diseased Plants Order (Northern Ireland) 1922
No. 78	The Training of Teachers' Committee Order (Northern Ireland) 1922
No. 79	The Special Constabulary (Appointment and Position) Regulations (Northern Ireland) 1922
No. 80	The Celluloid and Cinematograph Film (Fees) Order (Northern Ireland) 1922
No. 81 - 84	
No. 85	The Civil Authorities (Special Powers) Prisoners detained in H.M. Prisons Regulations (Northern Ireland) 1922
No. 86	The Civil Authorities (Special Powers) Prisoners detained elsewhere than in H.M. Prisons Regulations (Northern Ireland) 1922
No. 87	The Persons Interned Regulations (Northern Ireland) 1922

== See also ==
- List of statutory rules of Northern Ireland
