= List of statutory rules and orders of Northern Ireland, 1929 =

This is an incomplete list of statutory rules and orders of Northern Ireland during 1929. Statutory rules and orders were the predecessor of statutory rules and they formed the secondary legislation of Northern Ireland between 1922 and 1973.

Number	Title
No. 1 & 2	
No. 3	The Importation of Elm Trees (Prohibition) Order (Northern Ireland) 1929
No. 4	
No. 5	The Gas: Rate of Payment Order (Northern Ireland) 1929
No. 6	The Elections: Registration Rules and Forms Order (Northern Ireland) 1929
No. 7	The Dangerous Drugs: Manufacture, Sale, Prescription, &c. Order (Northern Ireland) 1929
No. 8	The Housing Grant Rules (Northern Ireland) 1929
No. 9	The Diseases of Animals Order (Northern Ireland) 1929
No. 10	
No. 11	The Workmen's Compensation Rules (Northern Ireland) 1929
No. 12	The National Health Insurance (Approved Societies) Amendment Regulations (Northern Ireland) 1929
No. 13	
No. 14	The National Health Insurance (Deposit Contributors) Amendment Regulations (Northern Ireland) 1929
No. 15	The Deposit Contributors Insurance Section Regulations (Northern Ireland) 1929
No. 16	
No. 17	The Evening Elementary School Regulations 1928 Amendment Regulations No. 1 (Northern Ireland) 1929
No. 18	
No. 19	The Public Health: Sanitary Order relating to Urban Districts (Northern Ireland) 1929
No. 20	The Raw Opium, Coca Leaves and India Hemp Regulations (Northern Ireland) 1929
No. 21	The Dangerous Drugs Regulations (Northern Ireland) 1929
No. 22 & 23	
No. 24	The Marketing of Eggs Rules (Northern Ireland) 1929
No. 25	
No. 26	The Dangerous Occurrences Notification Order (Northern Ireland) 1929
No. 27	The National Health Insurance and Contributory Pensions (Voluntary Contributors) Amendment Regulations (Northern Ireland) 1929
No. 28	
No. 29	The Workmen's Compensation (Industrial Diseases) Consolidation Order (Northern Ireland) 1929
No. 30	The Contributory Pensions (Mercantile Marine) Amendment Order (Northern Ireland) 1929
No. 31	
No. 32	The Arms and Ammunition: Firearm Permits Rules (Northern Ireland) 1929
No. 33	
No. 34	The Unemployment Insurance (Review of Claims) Regulations (Northern Ireland) 1929
No. 35	The Slaughtered Animals (Compensation) Order (Northern Ireland) 1929
No. 36 - 39	
No. 40	The Parliamentary Elections: Returning Officers' Charges Regulations (Northern Ireland) 1929
No. 41 & 42	
No. 43	The County and Rural District Councillors Election Order (Northern Ireland) 1929
No. 44	The Guardians Election Order (Northern Ireland) 1929
No. 45	The Urban District Councillors and Town Commissioners Election Order (Northern Ireland) 1929
No. 46	The Aldermen and Councillors of Boroughs Election Order (Northern Ireland) 1929
No. 47 & 48	
No. 49	The University Elections (Single Transferable Vote) Amendment Order (Northern Ireland) 1929
No. 50	The Secondary Teachers Regulations (Northern Ireland) 1929
No. 51 - 53	
No. 54	The Teachers Superannuation (Reciprocal Arrangements) Scheme (Northern Ireland) 1929
No. 55	The Salaries and Capitation Grants (Public Elementary Schools) Regulations (Northern Ireland) 1929
No. 56	The Live Stock Breeding Amendment Rules (Northern Ireland) 1929
No. 57	The Recognition Management, Inspection, &c. of Public Elementary Schools Regulations (Northern Ireland) 1929
No. 58	The Fisheries, Eel Fishing By-laws (Northern Ireland) 1929
No. 59	The Education, Pupil Teachers Regulations (Northern Ireland) 1929
No. 60	The Unemployment Insurance (Insurance Industry Special Scheme) (Variation and Amendment) Order (Northern Ireland) 1929
No. 61	The Unemployment Insurance (Insurance Year) Regulations (Northern Ireland) 1929
No. 62 & 63	
No. 64	The Contributory Pensions (Exempt and Excepted Persons) Amendment Regulations (Northern Ireland) 1929
No. 65 - 67	
No. 68	The Noxious Weeds Order (Northern Ireland) 1929
No. 69	The Housing Grant (Amendment) Rules (Northern Ireland) 1929
No. 70	The Local Government: Application of Enactments Regulations (Northern Ireland) 1929
No. 71 - 74	
No. 75	The Midwives and Nursing Homes Regulations (Northern Ireland) 1929
No. 76	The Noxious Weeds: Royal Ulster Constabulary Powers Order (Northern Ireland) 1929
No. 77	
No. 78	The Intoxicating Liquor: Licences, Rates of Charges Order (Northern Ireland) 1929
No. 79 & 80	
No. 81	The Trade Boards: Constitution, Proceedings and Meetings Regulations (Northern Ireland) 1929
No. 82 - 88	
No. 89	The Midwives and Nursing Home Regulations (Northern Ireland) 1929
No. 90	The Royal Ulster Constabulary Pensions (Amendment) Order (Northern Ireland) 1929
No. 91	The Education (School Attendance) Amendment Regulations (Northern Ireland) 1929
No. 92	
No. 93	The Marketing of Potatoes Rules (Northern Ireland) 1929
No. 94	
No. 95	The Unemployment Insurance (Mercantile Marine) Special Order (Northern Ireland) 1929
No. 96	The Unemployment Insurance (Mercantile Marine) (No. 2) Special Order (Northern Ireland) 1929
No. 97	
No. 98	The Malone Training School Regulations (Northern Ireland) 1929
No. 99	The Public Health (Deratisation of Ships) Regulations (Northern Ireland) 1929
No. 100 & 101	
No. 102	The Street Trading Regulations (Northern Ireland) 1929
No. 103	The Public Health (Notification of Puerperal Pyrexia) Regulations (Northern Ireland) 1929
No. 104	The Public Health (Ophthalmia Neonatorum) Regulations (Northern Ireland) 1929
No. 105	The Probation Rules (Northern Ireland) 1929
No. 106	The Reserve Fund (Capital Liabilities) Regulations (Northern Ireland) 1929
No. 107	
No. 108	The Dangerous Drugs: Esters of Morphine Order (Northern Ireland) 1929
No. 109 - 111	
No. 112	The Royal Ulster Constabulary Reward Fund Regulations (Northern Ireland) 1929
No. 113	The Special Constabulary Reward Fund Regulations (Northern Ireland) 1929
No. 114 - 126	
No. 127	The Local Government (Finance) Regulations (Northern Ireland) 1929
No. 128	The Public Bodies Order (Northern Ireland) 1929
No. 129	
No. 130	The Unemployment Insurance (Commencement of periods) Regulations (Northern Ireland) 1929
No. 131	The Ulster Loans Stock Order (Northern Ireland) 1929
No. 133 & 134	
No. 135	The Aldermen and Councillors of County Boroughs Election (Consolidation) Order (Northern Ireland) 1929
No. 136 - 138	
No. 139	The Parliamentary Grant (Education Authorities) Regulations (Northern Ireland) 1929
No. 140	The Black Scab in Potatoes Order (Northern Ireland) 1929
No. 141 - 160	
No. 161	The Unemployment Insurance (Mercantile Marine) (Collection of Contributions) (Amendment) Regulations (Northern Ireland) 1929
No. 162	The Staffing Public Elementary Schools 1928 Amendment Regulations No. 1 (Northern Ireland) 1929
No. 163	The Education, Pupil Teachers Regulations 1929, Amendment Regulations No. 1 (Northern Ireland) 1929
No. 164 - 166	
No. 167	The Pharmacy and Poisons Regulations (Northern Ireland) 1929
No. 168 & 169	
No. 170	The Census of Production 1931 Order (Northern Ireland) 1929
No. 171	The Contributory Pensions (Calculation of Contributions) Amendment Regulations (Northern Ireland) 1929
No. 172	The National Health Insurance (Contractors for Manual Labour) (Exclusion) Order (Northern Ireland) 1929
No. 173	The Public Health (Preservatives, etc., in Food) Amendment No. 2 Regulations (Northern Ireland) 1929
No. 174	The Royal Ulster Constabulary Allowances Consolidation Order (Northern Ireland) 1929

== See also ==
- List of statutory rules of Northern Ireland
