= Statutory rules and orders =

Former legislation procedure in the United Kingdom

Rules Publication Act 1893 (Note: Section 5.)
- Act of Parliament
- Parliament of the United Kingdom
- Long title: An Act for the Publication of Statutory Rules.
- Citation: 56 & 57 Vict. c. 66
- Territorial extent: United Kingdom

Dates
- Royal assent: 21 December 1893
- Commencement: 21 December 1893 (Note: The Acts of Parliament (Commencement) Act 1793.)
- Repealed: England and Wales and Scotland: 1 January 1948 (Note: The Statutory Instruments Act 1946 (Commencement) Order 1947 (SI 1947/3).); Northern Ireland: 29 March 1955
Other legislation
Repealed by	England and Wales and Scotland:Statute Law Revision Act 1908 and Statutory Instruments Act 1946; Northern Ireland: Northern Ireland Act 1955

Status: Repealed

Text of statute as originally enacted

Statutory Rules and Orders (SROs), also called General Statutory Rules (GSRs) are the means by which delegated legislation is made in India, and formerly in the United Kingdom between 1893 and 1974 and the Irish Free State until 1947.

Statutory rules and orders began with the Rules Publication Act 1893 (56 & 57 Vict. c. 66). Prior to that act there had been no consistent way of publishing orders, regulations or other delegated legislation made by the government.

In Great Britain they were replaced by statutory instruments in 1948 following the passing of the Statutory Instruments Act 1946.

In India, general statutory rules were first introduced with the General Clauses Act 1897 (No. 10), where they have been used ever since.

In the independent state of Ireland statutory rules and orders were replaced by statutory instruments defined by Statutory Instruments Act 1947 more broadly than in the 1946 UK act.

In Northern Ireland statutory rules and orders were replaced by statutory rules under the Statutory Rules (Northern Ireland) Order 1979 (SI 1979/1573).

== See also ==
- List of statutory rules and orders of the United Kingdom between 1897 and 1947
- List of statutory rules and orders of Northern Ireland between 1922 and 1973
