= List of acts of the Northern Ireland Assembly =

This is a list of acts of the Northern Ireland Assembly from its establishment in 1999 up until the present.

- No acts of the Northern Ireland Assembly were passed in 1999.
- List of acts of the Northern Ireland Assembly from 2000
- List of acts of the Northern Ireland Assembly from 2001
- List of acts of the Northern Ireland Assembly from 2002
- No acts of the Northern Ireland Assembly were passed from 2003 to 2006.
- List of acts of the Northern Ireland Assembly from 2007
- List of acts of the Northern Ireland Assembly from 2008
- List of acts of the Northern Ireland Assembly from 2009
- List of acts of the Northern Ireland Assembly from 2010
- List of acts of the Northern Ireland Assembly from 2011
- List of acts of the Northern Ireland Assembly from 2012
- List of acts of the Northern Ireland Assembly from 2013
- List of acts of the Northern Ireland Assembly from 2014
- List of acts of the Northern Ireland Assembly from 2015
- List of acts of the Northern Ireland Assembly from 2016
- No acts of the Northern Ireland Assembly were passed from 2017 to 2019.
- List of acts of the Northern Ireland Assembly from 2020
- List of acts of the Northern Ireland Assembly from 2021
- List of acts of the Northern Ireland Assembly from 2022
- List of acts of the Northern Ireland Assembly from 2023
- List of acts of the Northern Ireland Assembly from 2024
- List of acts of the Northern Ireland Assembly from 2025
- List of acts of the Northern Ireland Assembly from 2026
