= List of statutory rules of Northern Ireland, 2025 =

This is a list of statutory rules made in the Northern Ireland in the year 2025.

== 1-100 ==
| Number | Title |
|---|---|
| 1 | The Housing Benefit and Universal Credit Housing Costs (Executive Determinations) (Modification) Regulations (Northern Ireland) 2025 |
| 2 | The Gaming (Variation of Monetary Limits) Order (Northern Ireland) 2025 |
| 3 | The Social Security (Miscellaneous Amendments) Regulations (Northern Ireland) 2025 |
| 4 | The Rules of the Court of Judicature (Northern Ireland) (Amendment) 2025 |
| 5 | The Sydenham By-Pass, Belfast (Stopping-Up) Order (Northern Ireland) 2025 |
| 6 | The Parking and Waiting Restrictions (Derry/Londonderry) (Amendment) Order (Northern Ireland) 2025 |
| 7 | The U8017 (unnamed road) off Redrock Road, Markethill (Abandonment) Order (Northern Ireland) 2025 |
| 8 | The Parking Places (Disabled Persons’ Vehicles) (Amendment) Order (Northern Ireland) 2025 |
| 9 | The Period Products (Department of Health Specified Public Service Bodies) Regulations (Northern Ireland) 2025 |
| 10 | Not Allocated |
| 11 | The Animals (Identification, Records, Movement and Enforcement) (Amendment) Regulations (Northern Ireland) 2025 |
| 12 | The Parking and Waiting Restrictions (Derry/Londonderry) (Amendment No. 2) Order (Northern Ireland) 2025 |
| 13 | The Public Interest Disclosure (Prescribed Persons) (Amendment) Order (Northern Ireland) 2025 |
| 14 | The Companies (Disqualification Orders) (Amendment) Regulations (Northern Ireland) 2025 |
| 15 | The Parking and Waiting Restrictions (Belfast) (Amendment) Order (Northern Ireland) 2025 |
| 16 | The Kinard Park, Garvagh (Abandonment) Order (Northern Ireland) 2025 |
| 17 | The Health and Social Care Pension Scheme (Amendment) Regulations (Northern Ireland) 2025 |
| 18 | The Waste (Materials Facilities) Regulations (Northern Ireland) 2025 |
| 19 | The Insolvency Practitioners (Recognised Professional Bodies) (Revocation of Recognition) Order (Northern Ireland) 2025 |
| 20 | The Further Education (Student Support) (Eligibility) (Amendment) Regulations (Northern Ireland) 2025 |
| 21 | The Rates (Small Business Hereditament Relief) (Amendment) Regulations (Northern Ireland) 2025 |
| 22 | The Gaming (Gaming Machines in Registered Clubs) Regulations (Northern Ireland) 2025 |
| 23 | The Emergency Fuel Payment Regulations (Northern Ireland) 2025 |
| 24 | The Social Security (Income and Capital Disregards) (Amendment) Regulations (Northern Ireland) 2025 |
| 25 | The Motor Vehicles (Authorised Weight) (Amendment) Regulations (Northern Ireland) 2025 |
| 26 | The Farm Sustainability Payments to Farmers (Amendment) Regulations (Northern Ireland) 2025 |
| 27 | The Rates (Regional Rates) Order (Northern Ireland) 2025 |
| 28 | The Rates (Exemption for Automatic Telling Machines in Rural Areas) Order (Northern Ireland) 2025 |
| 29 | The Rates (Temporary Rebate) (Amendment) Order (Northern Ireland) 2025 |
| 30 | The Waste (Fees and Charges) (Amendment) Regulations (Northern Ireland) 2025 |
| 31 | The Moore’s Lane, Lurgan (Abandonment) Order (Northern Ireland) 2025 |
| 32 | The Education (Student Support, etc.) (Amendment) Regulations (Northern Ireland) 2025 |
| 33 | The Farm Sustainability (Transitional Provisions) Regulations (Northern Ireland) 2025 |
| 34 | The Fair Employment (Specification of Public Authorities) (Amendment) Order (Northern Ireland) 2025 |
| 35 | The Police Trainee (Amendment) Regulations (Northern Ireland) 2025 |
| 36 | The Pneumoconiosis, etc., (Workers’ Compensation) (Payment of Claims) (Amendment) Regulations (Northern Ireland) 2025 |
| 37 | The Prohibition of Right-Hand Turn (Carrickfergus) Order (Northern Ireland) 2025 |
| 38 | The Pension Protection Fund and Occupational Pension Schemes (Levy Ceiling) Order (Northern Ireland) 2025 |
| 39 (C. 1) | The Private Tenancies (2022 Act) (Commencement No.2) Order (Northern Ireland) 2025 |
| 40 | The Farming for Sustainability Knowledge Transfer Payments Regulations (Northern Ireland) 2025 |
| 41 | The Suckler Cow Scheme Regulations (Northern Ireland) 2025 |
| 42 | The Teachers’ Pension Scheme (Amendment) Regulations (Northern Ireland) 2025 |
| 43 | The Rates (Social Sector Value) (Amendment) Regulations (Northern Ireland) 2025 |
| 44 | The Valuation (Telecommunications, Natural Gas and Water) (Amendment) Regulations (Northern Ireland) 2025 |
| 45 | The Emergency Fuel Payment (Amendment) Regulations (Northern Ireland) 2025 |
| 46 | The Optical Charges and Payments (Amendment) Regulations (Northern Ireland) 2025 |
| 47 | The Direct Payments to Farmers (Cross-Compliance) (Revocation) Regulations (Northern Ireland) 2025 |
| 48 | The Loading Bays on Roads (Amendment) Order (Northern Ireland) 2025 |
| 49 | The Planning (Fees) (Amendment) Regulations (Northern Ireland) 2025 |
| 50 | The Government Resources and Accounts Act (Northern Ireland) 2001 (Estimates and Accounts) (Designation of Bodies) Order 2025 |
| 51 | The Traffic Weight Restriction (Amendment) Order (Northern Ireland) 2025 |
| 52 | The Guaranteed Minimum Pensions Increase Order (Northern Ireland) 2025 |
| 53 | The Social Security Revaluation of Earnings Factors Order (Northern Ireland) 2025 |
| 54 | The Road Races (Tour of the Sperrins) Order (Northern Ireland) 2025 |
| 55 | The Public Service Pensions Revaluation Order (Northern Ireland) 2025 |
| 56 | The Road Races (Croft Hill Climb) Order (Northern Ireland) 2025 |
| 57 | The Roads (Speed Limit) Order (Northern Ireland) 2025 |
| 58 | The Welfare Supplementary Payment (Universal Credit) (Social Sector Size Criteria) Regulations (Northern Ireland) 2025 |
| 59 | The Welfare Supplementary Payment (Extension) Regulations (Northern Ireland) 2025 |
| 60 | The Welfare Supplementary Payment (Universal Credit) Regulations (Northern Ireland) 2025 |
| 61 | The Coronavirus Act 2020 (Extension of Provisions Relating to Live Links for Courts and Tribunals) Order (Northern Ireland) 2025 |
| 62 | The Coronavirus Act 2020 (Registration of Deaths and Still-Births) (Extension) Order (Northern Ireland) 2025 |
| 63 | The Employment Rights (Increase of Limits) Order (Northern Ireland) 2025 |
| 64 | The Social Security Benefits Up-rating Order (Northern Ireland) 2025 |
| 65 | The Road Races (Circuit of Ireland Rally) Order (Northern Ireland) 2025 |
| 66 | The Mesothelioma Lump Sum Payments (Conditions and Amounts) (Amendment) Regulations (Northern Ireland) 2025 |
| 67 | The Social Security Benefits Up-rating Regulations (Northern Ireland) 2025 |
| 68 | The Registered Rents (Increase) Order (Northern Ireland) 2025 |
| 69 | The Pensions Increase (Review) Order (Northern Ireland) 2025 |
| 70 | The Recognition of Professional Qualifications and Implementation of International Recognition Agreements (Amendment) (Extension to Switzerland etc.) Regulations (Northern Ireland) 2025 |
| 71 | The Road Races (Cookstown 100 Motor Cycle Road Race) Order (Northern Ireland) 2025 |
| 72 | The Road Races (Craigantlet Hill Climb) Order (Northern Ireland) 2025 |
| 73 | The Universal Credit, Personal Independence Payment, Jobseeker’s Allowance and Employment and Support Allowance (Claims and Payments) (Amendment and Modification) Regulations (Northern Ireland) 2025 |
| 74 | The Road Races (Spamount Hill Climb) Order (Northern Ireland) 2025 |
| 75 | The Road Races (North West 200) Order (Northern Ireland) 2025 |
| 76 | The Road Races (Maiden City Stages Rally) Order (Northern Ireland) 2025 |
| 77 | The Parking Places on Roads (Diplomatic Vehicles) Order (Northern Ireland) 2025 |
| 78 | The Northern Ireland Climate Commissioner Regulations (Northern Ireland) 2025 |
| 79 | The Parking Places (Disabled Persons’ Vehicles) (Amendment No. 2) Order (Northern Ireland) 2025 |
| 80 | The Electronic Monitoring Requirements (Responsible Officer) (Amendment) Order (Northern Ireland) 2025 |
| 81 | The Quality of Bathing Water (Amendment) Regulations (Northern Ireland) 2025 |
| 82 | Not Allocated |
| 83 | The Human Trafficking and Exploitation (Criminal Justice and Support for Victims) (Independent Guardian) (Amendment) Regulations (Northern Ireland) 2025 |
| 84 | The Period Products (Department for Communities Specified Public Service Bodies) Regulations (Northern Ireland) 2025 |
| 85 | The Kensington Avenue, Banbridge (Abandonment) Order (Northern Ireland) 2025 |
| 86 | The Rathenraw Industrial Estate, Antrim (Abandonment) Order (Northern Ireland) 2025 |
| 87 | The Roads (Speed Limit) (No. 2) Order (Northern Ireland) 2025 |
| 88 | The Loading Bays on Roads (Amendment No. 2) Order (Northern Ireland) 2025 |
| 89 | The Parking and Waiting Restrictions (Belfast) (Amendment No. 2) Order (Northern Ireland) 2025 |
| 90 | The Freight Containers (Safety Convention) Regulations (Northern Ireland) 2025 |
| 91 | The Rate Relief (Amendment) Regulations (Northern Ireland) 2025 |
| 92 | The Farming with Nature Regulations (Northern Ireland) 2025 |
| 93 | The Road Races (Drumhorc Hill Climb) Order (Northern Ireland) 2025 |
| 94 | The Parking Places on Roads (Coaches) (Amendment) Order (Northern Ireland) 2025 |
| 95 | The Road Races (Tandragee 100) Order (Northern Ireland) 2025 |
| 96 | The Road Races (Cairncastle Hill Climb) Order (Northern Ireland) 2025 |
| 97 | The Parking and Waiting Restrictions (Belfast) Order (Northern Ireland) 2025 |
| 98 | The Waiting Restrictions (Castlerock) Order (Northern Ireland) 2025 |
| 99 | The Parking Places (Disabled Persons’ Vehicles) (Amendment No. 3) Order (Northern Ireland) 2025 |
| 100 | The Health and Social Care Pension Schemes (Amendment No.2) Regulations (Northern Ireland) 2025 |

== 101-200 ==
| Number | Title |
|---|---|
| 101 | The Farming with Nature Scheme Regulations (Northern Ireland) 2025 |
| 102 | The Scallop Enhancement Sites (Prohibited Methods of Fishing) (Amendment) Regulations (Northern Ireland) 2025 |
| 103 | The Horticulture Pilot Scheme Regulations (Northern Ireland) 2025 |
| 104 | The Whole of Government Accounts (Designation of Bodies) Order (Northern Ireland) 2025 |
| 105 | The Road Races (Down Rally) Order (Northern Ireland) 2025 |
| 106 | The Road Races (Armoy Motorcycle Road Race) Order (Northern Ireland) 2025 |
| 107 | The Belsize Gardens and Belsize Way, Lisburn (Abandonment) Order (Northern Ireland) 2025 |
| 108 | The Loading Bays on Roads (Amendment No. 3) Order (Northern Ireland) 2025 |
| 109 | The Public Service (Civil Servants and Others) Pensions (Amendment) Regulations (Northern Ireland) 2025 |
| 110 | The Industrial Training Levy (Construction Industry) Order (Northern Ireland) 2025 |
| 111 | The Environmental Protection (Disposal of Polychlorinated Biphenyls and other Dangerous Substances) (Amendment) Regulations (Northern Ireland) 2025 |
| 112 | The Agriculture (Student Fees) (Amendment) Regulations (Northern Ireland) 2025 |
| 113 | The Compensation Orders (Disqualified Directors) Proceedings Rules (Northern Ireland) 2025 (revoked) |
| 114 | The Road Races (Garron Point Hill Climb) Order (Northern Ireland) 2025 |
| 115 | The Parking and Waiting Restrictions (Lisburn) (Amendment) Order (Northern Ireland) 2025 |
| 116 | The Loading Bays on Roads Order (Northern Ireland) 2025 |
| 117 | The Pharmaceutical Society of Northern Ireland (General) (Amendment) Regulations (Northern Ireland) 2025 |
| 118 | The Legal Complaints and Regulation (Penalty) Order (Northern Ireland) 2025 |
| 119 | The Legal Complaints and Regulation Act (Northern Ireland) 2016 (Appeals) Regulations 2025 |
| 120 | The Legal Complaints and Regulation Act (Northern Ireland) 2016 (Levy) Regulations 2025 |
| 121 | The Compensation Orders (Disqualified Directors) Proceedings (No. 2) Rules (Northern Ireland) 2025 |
| 122 | The Social Security (Income and Capital Disregards) (Amendment No. 2) Regulations (Northern Ireland) 2025 |
| 123 | The Road Races (Ulster Rally) Order (Northern Ireland) 2025 |
| 124 | The Houses in Multiple Occupation (Fees) (Amendment) Regulations (Northern Ireland) 2025 |
| 125 | Not Allocated |
| 126 | The Environmental Protection (Single-use Vapes) (Amendment) Regulations (Northern Ireland) 2025 |
| 127 | The Social Security (Claims and Payments) (Amendment) Regulations (Northern Ireland) 2025 |
| 128 | The Planning (Miscellaneous Amendments) Regulations (Northern Ireland) 2025 |
| 129 | The Social Security (Electronic Communications) (Amendment) Order (Northern Ireland) 2025 |
| 130 | The Control of Traffic (Belfast City Centre) Order (Northern Ireland) 2025 |
| 131 | The Control of Traffic (Glengall Street, Belfast) Order (Northern Ireland) 2025 |
| 132 | The Waiting Restrictions (Boyne Bridge Place, Belfast – Pick-up and Drop-off Point) Order (Northern Ireland) 2025 |
| 133 | The Parking Places on Roads (Coaches) (Glengall Street, Belfast) Order (Northern Ireland) 2025 |
| 134 | The Motorways Traffic (Amendment) Regulations (Northern Ireland) 2025 |
| 135 | The Allocation of Housing and Homelessness (Eligibility) (Amendment) Regulations (Northern Ireland) 2025 |

== See also ==
- List of acts of the Northern Ireland Assembly from 2025
- List of acts of the Parliament of the United Kingdom from 2025
