= List of acts of the Northern Ireland Assembly from 2026 =

This is a list of acts of the Northern Ireland Assembly passed in 2026. Acts of the Northern Ireland Assembly are enacted by the Northern Ireland Assembly, which has legislative authority over devolved matters in relation to Northern Ireland under the authority of the Northern Ireland Act 1998.

Acts are cited by calendar year, in the same fashion as acts of Parliament of the United Kingdom. Each act passed in a respective year is given a chapter number (abbreviated "c.") denoted by Arabic numerals, and citations are usually followed by the suffix "(N.I.)" so as to prevent confusion with acts of Parliament of the United Kingdom.

5 acts of the Northern Ireland Assembly have so far been passed in 2026.

indicates that an act has been transcribed on Wikisource, indicates that an act is available to view at legislation.gov.uk, and indicates the location of the original act in the Parliamentary Archives.

== Acts of the Northern Ireland Assembly ==
Short title	Citation	Royal assent
Long title
School Uniforms (Guidelines and Allowances) Act (Northern Ireland) 2026	2026 c. 1 (N.I.)	19 February 2026
An Act to make provision for binding guidelines on school uniform policies to be issued by the Department of Education and to extend eligibility for school clothing allowances payable by the Education Authority.
Deaths, Still-Births and Baby Loss Act (Northern Ireland) 2026	2026 c. 2 (N.I.)	25 February 2026
An Act to amend the law relating to the manner of notification of deaths, still-births and births and the manner of giving particulars relating to them; and to make provision for the issue of certificates recognising the loss of a baby.
Budget Act (Northern Ireland) 2026	2026 c. 3 (N.I.)	20 March 2026
An Act to authorise the use for the public service of certain resources for the years ending 31 March 2026 and 2027 (including, for the year ending 31 March 2026, income); to authorise the issue out of the Consolidated Fund of certain sums for the service of those years; to authorise the use of those sums for specified purposes; and to authorise the Department of Finance to borrow on the credit of those sums.
Hospital Parking Charges Act (Northern Ireland) 2026	2026 c. 4 (N.I.)	6 May 2026
An Act to further postpone the ban under the Hospital Parking Charges Act (Northern Ireland) 2022 on charging money for parking vehicles in hospital car parks.
RHI (Closure of Non-Domestic Scheme) Act (Northern Ireland) 2026	2026 c. 5 (N.I.)	17 June 2026
An Act to enable the Department for the Economy to make regulations to close the Non-Domestic RHI Scheme.

== See also ==
- List of acts of the Northern Ireland Assembly
