= List of statutory rules of Northern Ireland, 2021 =

This is a list of statutory rules made in the Northern Ireland in the year 2021.

== 1-100 ==
Number	Title
1	The COVID-19 Heating Payment Scheme Regulations (Northern Ireland) 2021
2	The Universal Credit (Transitional Provisions) (Claimants previously entitled to a severe disability premium) (Amendment) Regulations (Northern Ireland) 2021
3	The Health Protection (Coronavirus, Restrictions) (No. 2) (Amendment) Regulations (Northern Ireland) 2021
4	The Health Protection (Coronavirus, International Travel) (Amendment) Regulations (Northern Ireland) 2021
5	The Health Protection (Coronavirus, International Travel) (Amendment No. 2) Regulations (Northern Ireland) 2021
6	The Health Protection (Coronavirus, International Travel) (Amendment No. 3) Regulations (Northern Ireland) 2021
7	The Coronavirus Act 2020 (Revival) Order (Northern Ireland) 2021
8	The Mental Health (1986 Order) (Amendment) Order (Northern Ireland) 2021
9	The Health Protection (Coronavirus, International Travel) (Amendment No. 4) Regulations (Northern Ireland) 2021
10	The Health Protection (Coronavirus, International Travel, Pre-Departure Testing and Operator Liability) (Amendment) Regulations (Northern Ireland) 2021
11	The Alexandra Square, Lurgan (Abandonment) Order (Northern Ireland) 2021
12	The Prohibition of Waiting (Schools) Order (Northern Ireland) 2021
13	The Health Protection (Coronavirus, International Travel) (Amendment No. 5) Regulations (Northern Ireland) 2021
14	The Housing Benefit and Universal Credit Housing Costs (Executive Determinations) (Modification) Regulations (Northern Ireland) 2021
15	The Social Fund Funeral Expenses Payment (Amendment) Regulations (Northern Ireland) 2021
16	The Crown Court (Amendment) Rules (Northern Ireland) 2021
17	The Health Protection (Coronavirus, International Travel, Operator Liability and Public Health Advice) (Amendment) Regulations (Northern Ireland) 2021
18	The Health Protection (Coronavirus, Restrictions) (No. 2) (Amendment No. 2) Regulations (Northern Ireland) 2021
19	The Parking Places (Disabled Persons’ Vehicles) (Amendment) Order (Northern Ireland) 2021
20	The Loading Bays on Roads (Amendment) Order (Northern Ireland) 2021
21	The Rates (Coronavirus: Making of District Rates) Regulations (Northern Ireland) 2021
22	The Parking Places (Disabled Persons’ Vehicles) (Amendment No. 2) Order (Northern Ireland) 2021
23	The Parking Places (Disabled Persons’ Vehicles) (Amendment No. 3) Order (Northern Ireland) 2021
24	The Rates (Coronavirus) (Emergency Relief) (No. 2) (Amendment) Regulations (Northern Ireland) 2021
25	The Superannuation (Commissioner for Survivors of Institutional Childhood Abuse) Order (Northern Ireland) 2021
26	The Healthy Start Scheme and Day Care Food Scheme (Amendment) Regulations (Northern Ireland) 2021
27	The Health Protection (Coronavirus, Restrictions) (No. 2) (Amendment No. 3) Regulations (Northern Ireland) 2021
28	The Loans for Mortgage Interest (Amendment) Regulations (Northern Ireland) 2021
29	The Health Protection (Coronavirus, Restrictions) (No. 2) (Amendment No. 4) Regulations (Northern Ireland) 2021
30	The Rates (Making and Levying of Different Rates) Regulations (Northern Ireland) 2021
31	The Local Government (Capital Finance and Accounting) (Coronavirus) (Amendment) Regulations (Northern Ireland) 2021
32	The Health Protection (Coronavirus, International Travel) (Amendment No. 6) Regulations (Northern Ireland) 2021
33	The Taxi Driver (Coronavirus, Financial Assistance) Regulations (Northern Ireland) 2021
34	The Schools (Part-Time 20 mph Speed Limit) (Amendment) Order (Northern Ireland) 2021
35	The Waiting Restrictions (Bryansford) Order (Northern Ireland) 2021
36	The Parking and Waiting Restrictions (Belfast) (Amendment) Order (Northern Ireland) 2021
37	The Explosives (Appointment of Authorities and Enforcement) (Amendment) (EU Exit) Regulations (Northern Ireland) 2021
38	The Pension Protection Fund and Occupational Pension Schemes (Levy Ceiling) Order (Northern Ireland) 2021
39	The Health Protection (Coronavirus, International Travel) (Amendment No. 7) Regulations (Northern Ireland) 2021
40	The Direct Payments to Farmers (Amendment) Regulations (Northern Ireland) 2021
41	The Private Tenancies (Coronavirus Modifications) Regulations (Northern Ireland) 2021
42	The Direct Payments to Farmers (Simplifications) Regulations (Northern Ireland) 2021
43	The Police Service of Northern Ireland and Police Service of Northern Ireland Reserve (Injury Benefit) (Amendment) Regulations 2021
44	The Zoonoses (Amendment) Order (Northern Ireland) 2021
45	The Covid-19 Heating Payment Scheme (Amendment) Regulations (Northern Ireland) 2021
46	The Health Protection (Coronavirus, Restrictions) (No. 2) (Amendment No.5) Regulations (Northern Ireland) 2021
47	The Recovery of Health Services Charges (Amounts) (Amendment) Regulations (Northern Ireland) 2021
48	The Guaranteed Minimum Pensions Increase Order (Northern Ireland) 2021
49	The Ballyboley Road, Larne (Abandonment) Order (Northern Ireland) 2021
50	The Education (Student Support, etc.) (Amendment) Regulations (Northern Ireland) 2021
51	The Magistrates’ Courts (Amendment) Rules (Northern Ireland) 2021
52	The Covid-19 Study Disruption Payment Scheme Regulations (Northern Ireland) 2021
53	The Employment Rights (Northern Ireland) Order 1996 (Coronavirus, Calculation of a Week’s Pay) (Amendment) Regulations (Northern Ireland) 2021
54	The Health Protection (Coronavirus, International Travel) (Amendment No. 8) Regulations (Northern Ireland) 2021
55	The Pneumoconiosis, etc., (Workers’ Compensation) (Payment of Claims) (Amendment) Regulations (Northern Ireland) 2021
56	The Public Service Pensions Revaluation Order (Northern Ireland) 2021
57	The Planning (Development Management) (Temporary Modifications) (Coronavirus) (Amendment) Regulations (Northern Ireland) 2021
58	The Social Security Revaluation of Earnings Factors Order (Northern Ireland) 2021
59	The Mesothelioma Lump Sum Payments (Conditions and Amounts) (Amendment) Regulations (Northern Ireland) 2021
60	The Occupational and Personal Pension Schemes (General Levy) (Amendment) Regulations (Northern Ireland) 2021
61	The Corporate Insolvency and Governance Act 2020 (Coronavirus) (Amendment of Relevant Period in Schedule 8) Regulations (Northern Ireland) 2021
62	The Bus Operator (Coronavirus, Financial Assistance) Regulations (Northern Ireland) 2021
63	The Agricultural Commodities (Coronavirus)(Income Support) Scheme (Northern Ireland) 2021
64	The Social Security (Claims and Payments, Employment and Support Allowance, Personal Independence Payment and Universal Credit) (Telephone and Video Assessment) (Amendment) Regulations (Northern Ireland) 2021
65	The Sea Fish Industry (Coronavirus) (Fixed Costs) Scheme (Northern Ireland) 2021
66	The Automatic Enrolment (Earnings Trigger and Qualifying Earnings Band) Order (Northern Ireland) 2021
67	The Universal Credit (Extension of Coronavirus Measures) Regulations (Northern Ireland) 2021
68	The Travel Agents (Coronavirus, Financial Assistance) Regulations (Northern Ireland) 2021
69	The Health Protection (Coronavirus, International Travel) (Amendment No. 9) Regulations (Northern Ireland) 2021
70	The Housing Benefit (Persons who have attained the qualifying age for state pension credit) (Amendment) Regulations (Northern Ireland) 2021
71	The Health Protection (Coronavirus, Restrictions) (No. 2) (Amendment No. 6) Regulations (Northern Ireland) 2021
72	The Energy Performance of Buildings (Certificates and Inspections) (Amendment) Regulations (Northern Ireland) 2021
73	The Employment Rights (Increase of Limits) Order (Northern Ireland) 2021 (revoked)
74	The Business Tenancies (Coronavirus) (Restriction on Forfeiture: Relevant Period) (Northern Ireland) Regulations 2021 (revoked)
75	The Corporate Insolvency and Governance Act 2020 (Coronavirus) (Amendment of Certain Relevant Periods) Regulations (Northern Ireland) 2021
76	Not Allocated
77	The Parking and Waiting Restrictions (Londonderry) (Amendment) Order (Northern Ireland) 2021
78	The Parking and Waiting Restrictions (Carrickfergus) (Amendment) Order (Northern Ireland) 2021
79	The Parking Places, Loading Bays and Waiting Restrictions (Coleraine) (Amendment) Order (Northern Ireland) 2021
80	The Road Races (Knockagh Hill Climb) Order (Northern Ireland) 2021
81	The Licensing (Designation of Outdoor Stadia) Regulations (Northern Ireland) 2021
82	The Social Security Benefits Up-rating Order (Northern Ireland) 2021
83	The Social Security Benefits Up-rating Regulations (Northern Ireland) 2021
84	The Health Protection (Coronavirus, International Travel) (Amendment No. 10) Regulations (Northern Ireland) 2021
85	The Education (Student Fees and Support) (Amendment) (No.2) Regulations (Northern Ireland) 2021
86	The Financial Assistance (Coronavirus) (Industrial Business) Regulations (Northern Ireland) 2021
87	The Financial Assistance (Coronavirus) (Business Support) Regulations (Northern Ireland) 2021
88	The Financial Assistance (Coronavirus) (Large Business) Regulations (Northern Ireland) 2021
89	The Financial Assistance (Coronavirus) (Soft Play Businesses) Regulations (Northern Ireland) 2021
90	The Financial Assistance (Coronavirus) (Airports) (Amendment) Regulations (Northern Ireland) 2021
91	The Health Protection (Coronavirus, Restrictions) (No. 2) (Amendment No. 7) Regulations (Northern Ireland) 2021
92	The Pensions Increase (Review) Order (Northern Ireland) 2021
93	The Health Protection (Coronavirus, Restrictions) Regulations (Northern Ireland) 2021
94	The Financial Assistance (Coronavirus) (No. 2) (Amendment) Regulations (Northern Ireland) 2021
95	The Health Protection (Coronavirus, International Travel) (Amendment No. 11) Regulations (Northern Ireland) 2021
96	The Health Protection (Coronavirus, Wearing of Face Coverings) (Amendment) Regulations (Northern Ireland) 2021
97	The Health Protection (Coronavirus, Restrictions) Regulations (Northern Ireland) 2021 (Amendment) Regulations (Northern Ireland) 2021
98	The Coronavirus Act 2020 (Suspension) Order (Northern Ireland) 2021
99	The Health Protection (Coronavirus, International Travel) Regulations (Northern Ireland) 2021
100	Not Allocated

== 101-200 ==
Number	Title
101	The Mental Health (1986 Order) (Amendment No. 2) Order (Northern Ireland) 2021
102	The Health Protection (Coronavirus, International Travel, Operator Liability and Information to Passengers) Regulations (Northern Ireland) 2021
103	The Employment Rights (Northern Ireland) Order 1996 (Protection from Detriment in Health and Safety Cases) (Amendment) Order (Northern Ireland) 2021
104	The Corporate Insolvency and Governance Act 2020 (Coronavirus) (Change of Expiry Date in section 32(1)) Regulations (Northern Ireland) 2021
105	The Social Security (Coronavirus) (Miscellaneous Amendments) Regulations (Northern Ireland) 2021
106	The Corporate Insolvency and Governance Act 2020 (Coronavirus) (Suspension of Liability for Wrongful Trading) Regulations (Northern Ireland) 2021
107 (C. 1)	The Addressing Bullying in Schools (2016 Act) (Commencement) Order (Northern Ireland) 2021
108	The Health Protection (Coronavirus, International Travel) (Amendment) Regulations (Northern Ireland) 2021
109	The Health Protection (Coronavirus, Restrictions) Regulations (Northern Ireland) 2021 (Amendment No. 2) Regulations (Northern Ireland) 2021
110	The Rates (Regional Rates) Order (Northern Ireland) 2021
111	The Rates (Small Business Hereditament Relief) (Amendment) Regulations (Northern Ireland) 2021
112	The Employment Rights (Northern Ireland) Order 1996 (Coronavirus, Calculation of a Week’s Pay) (Amendment) (No. 2) Regulations (Northern Ireland) 2021
113 (C. 2)	The Public Services Ombudsman Act (Northern Ireland) 2016 (Commencement) Order (Northern Ireland) 2021
114	The Departments (Transfer of Functions) Order (Northern Ireland) 2021
115	The Damages (Personal Injury) Order (Northern Ireland) 2021
116	The Rates (Coronavirus) (Emergency Relief) Regulations (Northern Ireland) 2021
117	The Health Protection (Coronavirus, Restrictions) Regulations (Northern Ireland) 2021 (Amendment No. 3) Regulations (Northern Ireland) 2021
118	The Housing Benefit and Universal Credit (Care Leavers and Homeless) Regulations (Northern Ireland) 2021
119	The Rates (Exemption for Automatic Telling Machines in Rural Areas) Order (Northern Ireland) 2021
120	The Whole of Government Accounts (Designation of Bodies) Order (Northern Ireland) 2021
121	The Health Protection (Coronavirus, International Travel) (Amendment No. 2) Regulations (Northern Ireland) 2021
122	The On-Street Parking (Residents Parking Zone – Rugby Road / College Park Avenue Area, Belfast) (Amendment) Order (Northern Ireland) 2021
123	The Road Races (Croft Hill Climb) Order (Northern Ireland) 2021
124	The Lake Street, Lurgan (Abandonment) Order (Northern Ireland) 2021
125	The Common, Markethill Road, Newtownhamilton (Abandonment) Order (Northern Ireland) 2021
126	The Dunbar Link and Great Patrick Street, Belfast (Abandonment) Order (Northern Ireland) 2021
127	The Official Statistics (Amendment) Order (Northern Ireland) 2021
128	The Parking and Waiting Restrictions (Crumlin) Order (Northern Ireland) 2021
129	The Rules of the Court of Judicature (Northern Ireland) (Amendment) 2021
130	The Health Protection (Coronavirus, Restrictions) Regulations (Northern Ireland) 2021 (Amendment No. 4) Regulations (Northern Ireland) 2021
131	The Health Protection (Coronavirus, Wearing of Face Coverings) (Amendment No. 2) Regulations (Northern Ireland) 2021
132	The Health Protection (Coronavirus, International Travel) (Amendment No. 3) Regulations (Northern Ireland) 2021
133	The Agriculture (Student fees) (Amendment) Regulations (Northern Ireland) 2021
134	The Rates (Social Sector Value) (Amendment) Regulations (Northern Ireland) 2021
135 (C. 3)	The Crime and Security Act 2010 (Commencement No.1) (Northern Ireland) Order 2021
136	The Motor Vehicles (Driving Instruction) (Trainee Licence) (Amendment) (Coronavirus) Regulations (Northern Ireland) 2021
137	The Motor Vehicles (Driving Instruction) (Amendment) (Coronavirus) Regulations (Northern Ireland) 2021
138	The Parole Commissioners’ (Amendment) Rules (Northern Ireland) 2021
139	The Renewables Obligation (Amendment) Order (Northern Ireland) 2021
140	The Insolvency (Amendment) (2016 Act) (Consequential Amendments and Revocation) Order (Northern Ireland) 2021
141	The Health Protection (Coronavirus, Restrictions) Regulations (Northern Ireland) 2021 (Amendment No. 5) Regulations (Northern Ireland) 2021
142	The Parking and Waiting Restrictions (Newtownabbey) (Amendment) Order (Northern Ireland) 2021
143	The Private Accesses on the Trunk Road T4 (“the A1 Junctions Phase 2 – Loughbrickland to Hillsborough”) (Stopping-Up) Order (Northern Ireland) 2021
144	The Waiting Restrictions (Maghera) Order (Northern Ireland) 2021
145	The Road Races (Cairncastle Hill Climb) Order (Northern Ireland) 2021
146 (C. 4)	The Road Traffic (Amendment) (2016 Act) (Commencement No. 3) Order (Northern Ireland) 2021
147	The Domestic Energy Efficiency Grants (Amendment) Regulations (Northern Ireland) 2021
148	The Low Road, Newry (Abandonment) Order (Northern Ireland) 2021
149	The Parking Place (Greencastle Street, Kilkeel) Order (Northern Ireland) 2021
150	The One-Way Traffic (Belfast) (Amendment) Order (Northern Ireland) 2021
151	The Health Protection (Coronavirus, Restrictions) Regulations (Northern Ireland) 2021 (Amendment No. 6) Regulations (Northern Ireland) 2021
152	The Trunk Road T4 (Loughbrickland to Hillsborough) Order (Northern Ireland) 2021
153	The Trunk Road T2 (Ballynahinch Bypass) Order (Northern Ireland) 2021
154	The Health Protection (Coronavirus, International Travel) (Amendment No. 4) Regulations (Northern Ireland) 2021
155	The Proceeds of Crime Act 2002 (Application of Police and Criminal Evidence (Northern Ireland) Order 1989) (Amendment) Order (Northern Ireland) 2021
156	The Police Act 1997 (Criminal Record Certificates: Relevant Matters) (Amendment) Order (Northern Ireland) 2021
157	The Parking and Waiting Restrictions (Ballymena) Order (Northern Ireland) 2021
158	The Control of Traffic (Londonderry) Order (Northern Ireland) 2021
159	The Parking Places (Disabled Persons’ Vehicles) (Amendment No. 4) Order (Northern Ireland) 2021
160	The Public Health Notifiable Diseases Order (Northern Ireland) 2021
161	The Sea Fish Industry (Coronavirus) (Fixed Costs) Regulations (Northern Ireland) 2021
162	The Waiting Restrictions (Draperstown) Order (Northern Ireland) 2021
163	The Loading Bays on Roads (Amendment No. 2) Order (Northern Ireland) 2021
164	The Parking Places (Disabled Persons’ Vehicles) (Amendment No. 5) Order (Northern Ireland) 2021
165	The Corporate Insolvency and Governance Act 2020 (Coronavirus) (Amendment of Certain Relevant Periods) (No. 2) Regulations (Northern Ireland) 2021
166	The Registered Rents (Increase) Order (Northern Ireland) 2021
167 (C. 5)	The Criminal Finances (2017 Act) (Commencement) Regulations (Northern Ireland) 2021
168	The Proceeds of Crime Act 2002 (Search, Seizure and Detention of Property: Code of Practice) Order (Northern Ireland) 2021
169	The Proceeds of Crime Act 2002 (Cash Searches: Code of Practice) Order (Northern Ireland) 2021
170	The Proceeds of Crime Act 2002 (Investigations: Code of Practice) Order (Northern Ireland) 2021
171	The Proceeds of Crime Act 2002 (Recovery of Listed Assets: Code of Practice) Order (Northern Ireland) 2021
172	The Health Protection (Coronavirus, Restrictions) Regulations (Northern Ireland) 2021 (Amendment No. 7) Regulations (Northern Ireland) 2021
173	The Disclosure of Victims’ and Witnesses’ Information (Prescribed Bodies) (Amendment) Regulations (Northern Ireland) 2021
174	The Administration (Restrictions on Disposal etc. to Connected Persons) Regulations (Northern Ireland) 2021
175	The Road Races (Garron Point Hill Climb) Order (Northern Ireland) 2021
176	The Waiting Restrictions (Newtownhamilton) Order (Northern Ireland) 2021
177	The Parking Places on Roads and Waiting Restrictions (Cookstown) (Amendment) Order (Northern Ireland) 2021
178	The Parking Places (Disabled Persons’ Vehicles) (Amendment No. 6) Order (Northern Ireland) 2021
179	The Parking and Waiting Restrictions (Ballynahinch) (Amendment) Order (Northern Ireland) 2021
180	The One-Way Traffic (Belfast) (Amendment No. 2) Order (Northern Ireland) 2021
181	The Direct Payments to Farmers (Controls and Checks) (Coronavirus) Regulations (Northern Ireland) 2021
182	The Waste (Fees and Charges) (Amendment) Regulations (Northern Ireland) 2021
183	The Criminal Justice (Sentencing) (Licence Conditions) (Northern Ireland) (Amendment) Rules 2021
184	The Water and Sewerage Services (Electronic Communications) Order (Northern Ireland) 2021
185	The Business Tenancies (Coronavirus) (Restriction on Forfeiture: Relevant Period) (Northern Ireland) (No. 2) Regulations 2021 (revoked)
186	Sort ascending byTitle Years and Numbers Legislation type The Agricultural Commodities (Coronavirus)(Income Support) Scheme No. 2 (Northern Ireland) 2021
187	The Agricultural (2017 North West Area Flooding) (Income Support) Scheme (Northern Ireland) 2021
188	The Child Support Maintenance Calculation (Amendment) Regulations (Northern Ireland) 2021
189	The Health Protection (Coronavirus, International Travel and Operator Liability and Information to Passengers) (Amendment) Regulations (Northern Ireland) 2021
190	The Housing (Notification of Disposals and Mortgages) Regulations (Northern Ireland) 2021
191	The Road Races (Armoy Motorcycle Road Race) Order (Northern Ireland) 2021
192	The Parking and Waiting Restrictions (Ballyclare) (Amendment) Order (Northern Ireland) 2021
193	The Waiting Restrictions and Urban Clearways (John Street and Kevlin Road, Omagh) Order (Northern Ireland) 2021
194	The Waiting Restrictions (Whitehead) (Amendment) Order (Northern Ireland) 2021
195	The Roads (Speed Limit) Order (Northern Ireland) 2021
196	The Agriculture (Student fees) (Amendment) (No. 2) Regulations (Northern Ireland) 2021
197	The Health Protection (Coronavirus, Restrictions) Regulations (Northern Ireland) 2021 (Amendment No. 8) Regulations (Northern Ireland) 2021
198	The Establishment and Agencies (Fitness of Workers) (Revocation) Regulations (Northern Ireland) 2021
199	The Health Protection (Coronavirus, Restrictions) Regulations (Northern Ireland) 2021 (Amendment No. 9) Regulations (Northern Ireland) 2021
200	The Parking and Waiting Restrictions (Belfast) (Amendment No. 2) Order (Northern Ireland) 2021

== 201-348 ==
Number	Title
201	The Health Protection (Coronavirus, Restrictions) Regulations (Northern Ireland) 2021 (Amendment No. 10) Regulations (Northern Ireland) 2021
202	The Further Education (Student Support) (Eligibility) (Amendment etc.) (EU Exit) Regulations (Northern Ireland) 2021
203	The Justice Act (Northern Ireland) 2016 (Relevant Benefits) Order (Northern Ireland) 2021
204	The Trunk Road T6 (A4 Enniskillen Southern Bypass) Order (Northern Ireland) 2021
205	The River Sillees Bridge Order (Northern Ireland) 2021
206	The River Erne Bridge Order (Northern Ireland) 2021
207	The Social Security (Reciprocal Agreements) (Miscellaneous Amendments) Regulations (Northern Ireland) 2021
208	The River Erne (Diversion of Navigable Watercourse and Extinguishment of Public Rights of Navigation) Order (Northern Ireland) 2021
209	The Universal Credit (Coronavirus) (Restoration of the Minimum Income Floor) Regulations (Northern Ireland) 2021
210	The Industrial Training Levy (Construction Industry) Order (Northern Ireland) 2021
211	The Northern Ireland Police Fund (Amendment) Regulations 2021
212	The Police Rehabilitation and Retraining Trust (Amendment) Regulations (Northern Ireland) 2021
213	The Health Protection (Coronavirus, International Travel, Operator Liability and Information to Passengers) (Amendment No. 2) Regulations (Northern Ireland) 2021
214	The Health Protection (Coronavirus, International Travel, Operator Liability and Information to Passengers) (Amendment No. 3) Regulations (Northern Ireland) 2021
215	The Social Security (Fines) (Deduction from Benefits) Regulations (Northern Ireland) 2021
216	The Health Protection (Coronavirus, Wearing of Face Coverings) (Amendment No. 3) Regulations (Northern Ireland) 2021
217	The Health Protection (Coronavirus, Restrictions) Regulations (Northern Ireland) 2021 (Amendment No. 11) Regulations (Northern Ireland) 2021
218	The Health Protection (Coronavirus, International Travel) (2021 Consolidation) (Amendment No. 5) Regulations (Northern Ireland) 2021
219	The Health Protection (Coronavirus, Wearing of Face Coverings) (Amendment No. 4) Regulations (Northern Ireland) 2021
220	The Health Protection (Coronavirus, Restrictions) Regulations (Northern Ireland) 2021 (Amendment No. 12) Regulations (Northern Ireland) 2021
221	The Misuse of Drugs (Amendment) Regulations (Northern Ireland) 2021
222	The Misuse of Drugs (Designation) (Amendment) Regulations (Northern Ireland) 2021
223	Not Allocated
224	The Health Protection (Coronavirus, Restrictions) Regulations (Northern Ireland) 2021 (Amendment No. 13) Regulations (Northern Ireland) 2021
225	The Health Protection (Coronavirus, International Travel, Operator Liability and Information to Passengers) (Amendment No. 4) Regulations (Northern Ireland) 2021
226	The Urban Clearways (Amendment) Order (Northern Ireland) 2021
227	The Prohibition of Waiting (Schools) (Amendment) Order (Northern Ireland) 2021
228	The Parking Places and Waiting Restrictions (Ballymoney) (Amendment) Order (Northern Ireland) 2021
229	The Road Races (Eagles Rock Hill Climb) Order (Northern Ireland) 2021
230	The Health Protection (Coronavirus, International Travel, Operator Liability and Information to Passengers) (Amendment No. 5) Regulations (Northern Ireland) 2021
231	The Misuse of Drugs (Designation) (Amendment) Order (Northern Ireland) 2021
232	The Lotteries (Amendment) Regulations (Northern Ireland) 2021
233	The Health Protection (Coronavirus, Restrictions) Regulations (Northern Ireland) 2021 (Amendment No. 14) Regulations (Northern Ireland) 2021
234 (C. 6)	The Pension Schemes (2021 Act) (Commencement No. 1 and Transitional Provisions) Order (Northern Ireland) 2021
235	The Prohibition of Right-Hand Turn (Dungiven) Order (Northern Ireland) 2021
236	The Road Races (Bushwhacker Rally) Order (Northern Ireland) 2021
237	The Road Races (Craigantlet Hill Climb) Order (Northern Ireland) 2021
238	The Road Races (Cookstown 100 Motor Cycle Road Race) Order (Northern Ireland) 2021
239 (C. 7)	The Welfare Reform (Northern Ireland) Order 2015 (Commencement No 15) Order 2021
240 (C. 8)	The Pension Schemes Act 2021 (Commencement No. 1) Order (Northern Ireland) 2021
241	The Health Protection (Coronavirus, International Travel) (2021 Consolidation) (Amendment No. 6) Regulations (Northern Ireland) 2021
242	The Private Tenancies (Coronavirus Modifications) (No.2) Regulations (Northern Ireland) 2021
243	The Pensions Regulator (Information Gathering Powers and Modification) Regulations (Northern Ireland) 2021
244	The Occupational Pension Schemes (Climate Change Governance and Reporting) Regulations (Northern Ireland) 2021
245	The New NAV List (Time of Valuation) Order (Northern Ireland) 2021
246	The Occupational Pension Schemes (Climate Change Governance and Reporting) (Miscellaneous Provisions and Amendments) Regulations (Northern Ireland) 2021
247 (C. 9)	The Licensing and Registration of Clubs (Amendment) (2021 Act) (Commencement No.1) Order (Northern Ireland) 2021
248	The Housing Benefit and Universal Credit (Sanctuary Schemes) (Amendment) Regulations (Northern Ireland) 2021
249	The Universal Credit (Childcare Costs) (Amendment) Regulations (Northern Ireland) 2021
250	The Health Protection (Coronavirus, Wearing of Face Coverings) (Amendment No. 5) Regulations (Northern Ireland) 2021
251	The Health Protection (Coronavirus, Restrictions) Regulations (Northern Ireland) 2021 (Amendment No. 15) Regulations (Northern Ireland) 2021
252	The Financial Assistance (Aluminium Composite Material (ACM) Remediation Fund) (Private Residential Properties over 18m) Regulations (Northern Ireland) 2021
253 (C. 10)	The Employment Act (Northern Ireland) 2016 (Commencement No. 4) Order (Northern Ireland) 2021
254	The Allocation of Housing and Homelessness (Eligibility) (Amendment) Regulations (Northern Ireland) 2021
255	The Business Tenancies (Coronavirus) (Restriction on Forfeiture: Relevant Period) (Northern Ireland) (No. 3) Regulations 2021
256	The Road Races (Tour of the Sperrins Rally) Order (Northern Ireland) 2021
257	The Postal Administration Rules (Northern Ireland) 2021
	The Corporate Insolvency and Governance Act 2020 (Coronavirus) (Amendment of Relevant Period in Schedule 8) (No. 2) Regulations (Northern Ireland) 2021
259	The Corporate Insolvency and Governance Act 2020 (Coronavirus) (Amendment of Schedule 11) Regulations (Northern Ireland) 2021
260	The Education (Student Fees (Amounts), Loan Repayment and Support etc.)(Amendment) Regulations (Northern Ireland) 2021
261	The Pensions Regulator (Employer Resources Test) Regulations (Northern Ireland) 2021
262	The Health Protection (Coronavirus, International Travel, Operator Liability and Information to Passengers) (Amendment No. 6) Regulations (Northern Ireland) 2021
263	The Parking and Waiting Restrictions (Antrim) (Amendment) Order (Northern Ireland) 2021
264	The Prohibition of Waiting (Schools) (Amendment No. 2) Order (Northern Ireland) 2021
265	The Urban Clearways (Amendment No. 2) Order (Northern Ireland) 2021
266	The Parking Places, Loading Bay and Waiting Restrictions (Downpatrick) (Amendment) Order (Northern Ireland) 2021
267	The Social Security Benefits (Claims and Payments) (Amendment) Regulations (Northern Ireland) 2021
268	The High Street (Coronavirus, Financial Assistance) Scheme Regulations (Northern Ireland) 2021
269	The Social Security (Habitual Residence and Past Presence) (Amendment) Regulations (Northern Ireland) 2021
270	The Planning (Development Management) (Temporary Modifications) (Coronavirus) (Amendment No.2) Regulations (Northern Ireland) 2021
271 (C. 11)	The Pension Schemes Act 2021 (Commencement No. 2 and Transitional and Saving Provisions) Order (Northern Ireland) 2021
272	The Occupational Pension Schemes (Administration, Investment and Charges and Governance) (Amendment) Regulations (Northern Ireland) 2021
273	The Parking Places (Disabled Persons’ Vehicles) (Amendment No. 7) Order (Northern Ireland) 2021
274	The Health Protection (Coronavirus, Wearing of Face Coverings) (Amendment) (No.6) Regulations (Northern Ireland) 2021
275	The Prohibition of U-Turns (Belfast) Order (Northern Ireland) 2021
276	The Health Protection (Coronavirus, Restrictions) Regulations (Northern Ireland) 2021 (Amendment No. 16) Regulations (Northern Ireland) 2021
277	The Social Security (Switzerland) Order (Northern Ireland) 2021
278	The Health Protection (Coronavirus, International Travel, Operator Liability and Information to Passengers) (Amendment No. 7) Regulations (Northern Ireland) 2021
279	The One-Way Traffic (Ballynure) Order (Northern Ireland) 2021
280	The Parking Places on Roads and Waiting Restrictions (Dungannon) (Amendment) Order (Northern Ireland) 2021
281	The Social Security (Amendment) (EU Exit) Regulations (Northern Ireland) 2021
282	The Health Protection (Coronavirus, International Travel, Operator Liability and Information to Passengers) (Amendment No. 8) Regulations (Northern Ireland) 2021
283	The Health Protection (Coronavirus, Restrictions) Regulations (Northern Ireland) 2021 (Amendment No. 17) Regulations (Northern Ireland) 2021
284	The Health Protection (Coronavirus, International Travel) (2021 Consolidation) (Amendment No. 7) Regulations (Northern Ireland) 2021
285	The Employment and Support Allowance and Universal Credit (Coronavirus) (Amendment) Regulations (Northern Ireland) 2021
286	The Provision of Health Services to Persons Not Ordinarily Resident (Amendment) Regulations (Northern Ireland) 2021
287	The Social Security (Amendment) Regulations (Northern Ireland) 2021
288	The Jobseeker’s Allowance and Employment and Support Allowance (Amendment) Regulations (Northern Ireland) 2021
289	The Social Security (Information-sharing in relation to Welfare Services etc.) (Amendment) Regulations (Northern Ireland) 2021
290	The Road Races (Ulster Rally) Order (Northern Ireland) 2021
291	The Health Protection (Coronavirus, Wearing of Face Coverings) (Amendment) (No.7) Regulations (Northern Ireland) 2021
292	The Health Protection (Coronavirus, Restrictions) Regulations (Northern Ireland) 2021 (Amendment No. 18) Regulations (Northern Ireland) 2021
293	The Health Protection (Coronavirus, International Travel) (2021 Consolidation) (Amendment No. 8) Regulations (Northern Ireland) 2021
294	The Parking Places, Loading Bay and Waiting Restrictions (Randalstown) (Amendment) Order (Northern Ireland) 2021
295	The Prohibition of Waiting (Schools) (Amendment No. 3) Order (Northern Ireland) 2021
296	The Traffic Weight Restriction (Clady) Order (Northern Ireland) 2021
297	The Female Genital Mutilation Protection Order (Relevant Third Party) Order (Northern Ireland) 2021
298	The Occupational and Personal Pension Schemes (Conditions for Transfers) Regulations (Northern Ireland) 2021
299	The General Register Office (Fees) Amendment Order (Northern Ireland) 2021
300 (C. 12)	The Pension Schemes Act 2021 (Commencement No. 3) Order (Northern Ireland) 2021
301	The Health Protection (Coronavirus, International Travel, Operator Liability and Information to Passengers) (Amendment No. 9) Regulations (Northern Ireland) 2021
302	The Universal Credit (Work Allowance and Taper) (Amendment) Regulations (Northern Ireland) 2021
303	The Universal Credit (Exceptions to the Requirement not to be receiving Education) (Amendment) Regulations (Northern Ireland) 2021
304	The Insolvency Practitioners (Recognised Professional Bodies) (Revocation of Recognition) Order (Northern Ireland) 2021
305	The Taxis (Taximeters, Devices and Maximum Fares) (Amendment) Regulations (Northern Ireland) 2021
306	The Parking Places (Disabled Persons’ Vehicles) (Amendment No. 8) Order (Northern Ireland) 2021
307	The Roads (Speed Limit) (No. 2) Order (Northern Ireland) 2021
308	The Roads (Speed Limit) (No. 3) Order (Northern Ireland) 2021
309	The Road Races (Targa Rally) Order (Northern Ireland) 2021
310	The Rockfield Park, Portaferry (Abandonment) Order (Northern Ireland) 2021
311	The Magistrates’ Courts and County Court Appeals (Criminal Legal Aid) (Costs) (Amendment) Rules (Northern Ireland) 2021
312	The Health Protection (Coronavirus, International Travel) (2021 Consolidation) (Amendment No. 9) Regulations (Northern Ireland) 2021
313	The Health Protection (Coronavirus, International Travel) (2021 Consolidation) (Amendment No. 10) Regulations (Northern Ireland) 2021
314	The Occupational Pensions (Revaluation) Order (Northern Ireland) 2021
315	The Health Protection (Coronavirus, Restrictions) Regulations (Northern Ireland) 2021 (Amendment No. 19) Regulations (Northern Ireland) 2021
316	The Health Protection (Coronavirus, International Travel, Operator Liability and Information to Passengers) (Amendment No. 10) Regulations (Northern Ireland) 2021
317	The State Pension Revaluation for Transitional Pensions Order (Northern Ireland) 2021
318	The State Pension Debits and Credits (Revaluation) Order (Northern Ireland) 2021
319	The High Street (Coronavirus, Financial Assistance) Scheme (Amendment) Regulations (Northern Ireland) 2021
320	The Pensions (2005 Order) (Code of Practice) (Contribution Notices: Circumstances in Relation to the Material Detriment Test, the Employer Insolvency Test and the Employer Resources Test) (Appointed Day) Order (Northern Ireland) 2021
321	The Spring Traps Approval (Amendment) Order (Northern Ireland) 2021
322	The Health Protection (Coronavirus, International Travel) (2021 Consolidation) (Amendment No. 11) Regulations (Northern Ireland) 2021
323	The Health Protection (Coronavirus, International Travel, Operator Liability and Information to Passengers) (Amendment No. 11) Regulations (Northern Ireland) 2021
324	The Parking and Waiting Restrictions (Lisburn) Order (Northern Ireland) 2021
325	Not Allocated
326	The Tobacco Retailer (Fixed Penalty) (General) (Amendment) Regulations (Northern Ireland) 2021
327	The Traffic Weight Restriction (Amendment) Order (Northern Ireland) 2021
328	The Smoke-Free (Private Vehicles) Regulations (Northern Ireland) 2021
329 (C. 13)	The Health (Miscellaneous Provisions) (2016 Act) (Commencement No. 2) Order (Northern Ireland) 2021
330	The Nicotine Inhaling Products (Age of Sale and Proxy Purchasing) Regulations (Northern Ireland) 2021
331	The Tobacco Retailer (Fixed Penalty) (Amount) (Amendment) Regulations (Northern Ireland) 2021
332	The Smoke-free (Premises, Vehicle Operators and Penalty Notices) (Amendment) Regulations (Northern Ireland) 2021
333	The Parking and Waiting Restrictions (Rathfriland) (Amendment) Order (Northern Ireland) 2021
334	The Health Protection (Coronavirus, Restrictions) Regulations (Northern Ireland) 2021 (Amendment No. 20) Regulations (Northern Ireland) 2021
335	The Edible Crabs (Undersized) (Amendment) Order (Northern Ireland) 2021
336	The Edible Crabs (Conservation) (Amendment) Regulations (Northern Ireland) 2021
337	The Regulation (EC) No 1370/2007 (Public Service Obligations in Transport) (Amendment) (EU Exit) (Northern Ireland) Regulations 2021
338	The Single Use Carrier Bags Charge (Amendment) Regulations (Northern Ireland) 2021
339	The Magistrates’ Courts (Licensing) (Amendment) Rules (Northern Ireland) 2021
340	The Health Protection (Coronavirus, International Travel) (2021 Consolidation) (Amendment No. 12) Regulations (Northern Ireland) 2021
341	Not Allocated
342	The Misuse of Drugs (Amendment No. 2) Regulations (Northern Ireland) 2021
343	The Health Protection (Coronavirus, International Travel) (2021 Consolidation) (Amendment No. 13) Regulations (Northern Ireland) 2021
344 (C. 14)	The Taxis (2008 Act) (Commencement No. 6) Order (Northern Ireland) 2021
345	The Social Security (Income and Capital Disregards) (Amendment) Regulations (Northern Ireland) 2021
346	The Direct Payments to Farmers (Review of Decisions) Regulations (Northern Ireland) 2021
347	The Statutory Sick Pay (Medical Evidence) (Modification) Regulations (Northern Ireland) 2021
348	The Health Protection (Coronavirus, Wearing of Face Coverings) (Amendment) (No.8) Regulations (Northern Ireland) 2021
349	The Health Protection (Coronavirus, Restrictions) Regulations (Northern Ireland) 2021 (Amendment No. 21) Regulations (Northern Ireland) 2021

== See also ==
- List of acts of the Northern Ireland Assembly from 2021
- List of acts of the Parliament of the United Kingdom from 2021
