= List of statutory rules of Northern Ireland, 2020 =

This is a list of statutory rules made in the Northern Ireland in the year 2020.

== 1-100 ==
Number	Title
1	The Employment Act (Northern Ireland) 2016 (Commencement No. 3) Order (Northern Ireland) 2020
2	The Industrial Tribunals and Fair Employment Tribunal (Early Conciliation: Exemptions and Rules of Procedure) Regulations (Northern Ireland) 2020
3	The Industrial Tribunals and Fair Employment Tribunal (Constitution and Rules of Procedure) Regulations (Northern Ireland) 2020
4	The Industrial Tribunals (1996 Order) (Application of Conciliation Provisions) Order (Northern Ireland) 2020
5	The Rates (Making and Levying of Different Rates) Regulations (Northern Ireland) 2020
6	The State Pension Debits and Credits (Revaluation) Order (Northern Ireland) 2020
7	The State Pension Revaluation for Transitional Pensions Order (Northern Ireland) 2020
8	The Agriculture (Student fees) (Amendment) Regulations (Northern Ireland) 2020
9	The Police Pensions (Additional Voluntary Contributions) (Amendment) Regulations (Northern Ireland) 2020
10	The Judicial Pensions (Amendment) Regulations (Northern Ireland) 2020
11	The County Court (Amendment) Rules (Northern Ireland) 2020
12	The Seafarers (Collective Redundancies, Information and Consultation and Insolvency Miscellaneous Amendments) Regulations (Northern Ireland) 2020
13	The Police Service of Northern Ireland (Amendment) Regulations 2020
14	The Housing Benefit and Universal Credit Housing Costs (Executive Determinations) (Amendment) Regulations (Northern Ireland) 2020
15	The Transfer of Undertakings and Service Provision Change (Protection of Employment) (Amendment) Regulations (Northern Ireland) 2020
16	The Food Safety (Information and Compositional Requirements) (Amendment) Regulations (Northern Ireland) 2020
17	The Mental Capacity (Research) (Amendment) Regulations (Northern Ireland) 2020
18	Not Allocated
19	The Provision of Health Services to Persons Not Ordinarily Resident (Amendment) (Revocation) Regulations (Northern Ireland) 2020
20	The Sea Fish Licensing (Revocation) Order (Northern Ireland) 2020
21	The Sea Fishing (Licences and Notices) (Revocation) Regulations (Northern Ireland) 2020
22	The Common Agricultural Policy (Direct Payments to Farmers) (Miscellaneous Amendments) Regulations (Northern Ireland) 2020
23	The Public Health Notifiable Diseases Order (Northern Ireland) 2020
24	The Food Information (Amendment) Regulations (Northern Ireland) 2020
25	The Provision of Health Services to Persons Not Ordinarily Resident (Amendment) Regulations (Northern Ireland) 2020
26	The Pneumoconiosis, etc., (Workers’ Compensation) (Payment of Claims) (Amendment) Regulations (Northern Ireland) 2020
27	The Social Security Revaluation of Earnings Factors Order (Northern Ireland) 2020
28	The Pension Protection Fund and Occupational Pension Schemes (Levy Ceiling and Compensation Cap) Order (Northern Ireland) 2020
29	The Public Service Pensions Revaluation Order (Northern Ireland) 2020
30	The Occupational and Personal Pension Schemes (General Levy) (Amendment) Regulations (Northern Ireland) 2020
31	The Electrically Assisted Pedal Cycles (Construction and Use) Regulations (Northern Ireland) 2020
32	The Statutory Sick Pay (General) (Coronavirus Amendment) Regulations (Northern Ireland) 2020
33	The Employment and Support Allowance and Universal Credit (Coronavirus) Regulations (Northern Ireland) 2020
34	The Recovery of Health Services Charges (Amounts) (Amendment) Regulations (Northern Ireland) 2020
35	The Guaranteed Minimum Pensions Increase Order (Northern Ireland) 2020
36	The Mesothelioma Lump Sum Payments (Conditions and Amounts) (Amendment) Regulations (Northern Ireland) 2020
37	The Statutory Sick Pay (General) (Coronavirus Amendment) (No. 2) Regulations (Northern Ireland) 2020
38	The Parking Places (Disabled Persons’ Vehicles) (Amendment) Order (Northern Ireland) 2020
39	The Motorways Traffic (Amendment) Regulations (Northern Ireland) 2020
40	The Social Security Benefits Up-rating Order (Northern Ireland) 2020
41	The Social Security Benefits Up-rating Regulations (Northern Ireland) 2020
42	The Employment Rights (Increase of Limits) Order (Northern Ireland) 2020
43	The Whole of Government Accounts (Designation of Bodies) Order (Northern Ireland) 2020
44	The Discretionary Support (Amendment) (COVID-19) Regulations (Northern Ireland) 2020
45	The Employment and Support Allowance and the Housing Benefit (Transitional Provisions) (Amendment) Regulations (Northern Ireland) 2020
46	The Mental Health (Northern Ireland) (Amendment) Order 2020
47	The Pensions Increase (Review) Order (Northern Ireland) 2020
48	The Historical Institutional Abuse (Northern Ireland) Act 2019 (Commencement No. 1) Order (Northern Ireland) 2020
49	The Occupational and Personal Pension Schemes (General Levy) (Revocation) Regulations (Northern Ireland) 2020
50	The Historical Institutional Abuse Redress Board (Applications and Appeals) Rules (Northern Ireland) 2020
51	The Automatic Enrolment (Earnings Trigger and Qualifying Earnings Band) Order (Northern Ireland) 2020
52	Not Allocated
53	The Social Security (Coronavirus) (Further Measures) Regulations (Northern Ireland) 2020
54	The Statutory Sick Pay (Coronavirus) (Suspension of Waiting Days and General Amendment) Regulations (Northern Ireland) 2020
55	The Health Protection (Coronavirus, Restrictions) Regulations (Northern Ireland) 2020
56	The Single Use Carrier Bags Charge (Coronavirus Amendment) Regulations (Northern Ireland) 2020
57	The Mental Capacity (Deprivation of Liberty) (Amendment) Regulations (Northern Ireland) 2020
58	The Coronavirus Act 2020 (Commencement No.1) Order (Northern Ireland) 2020
59	The Rates (Regional Rates) Order (Northern Ireland) 2020
60	The Establishment and Agencies (Fitness of Workers) Regulations (Northern Ireland) 2020
61	The Social Security (Coronavirus) (Further Measures) Amendment Regulations (Northern Ireland) 2020
62	The Social Fund Funeral Expenses Payment (Coronavirus) (Amendment) Regulations (Northern Ireland) 2020
63	The Social Security (Coronavirus) (Prisoners) Regulations (Northern Ireland) 2020
64	The Taxi license (Amendment) (Coronavirus) Regulations (Northern Ireland) 2020
65	The Police Trainee (Amendment) (Coronavirus) Regulations (Northern Ireland) 2020
66	The Statutory Sick Pay (General) (Coronavirus Amendment) (No. 3) Regulations (Northern Ireland) 2020
67	The Discretionary Support (Amendment No. 2) (COVID-19) Regulations (Northern Ireland) 2020
68	The Working Time (Coronavirus) (Amendment) Regulations (Northern Ireland) 2020
69	The Maternity Allowance and Statutory Maternity Pay (Normal Weekly Earnings etc.) (Coronavirus) (Amendment) Regulations (Northern Ireland) 2020
70	The Statutory Paternity Pay, Statutory Adoption Pay and Statutory Shared Parental Pay (Normal Weekly Earnings etc.) (Coronavirus) (Amendment) Regulations (Northern Ireland) 2020
71	The Health Protection (Coronavirus, Restrictions) (Amendment) Regulations (Northern Ireland) 2020 (revoked)
72	The Planning (Development Management) (Temporary Modifications) (Coronavirus) Regulations (Northern Ireland) 2020
73	The Misuse of Drugs (Amendment) Regulations (Northern Ireland) 2020
74	The Local Government (Coronavirus) (Flexibility of District Council Meetings) Regulations (Northern Ireland) 2020
75	The Direct Payments to Farmers (Crop Diversification Derogation) Regulations (Northern Ireland) 2020
76	The Sea Fish Industry (Coronavirus) (Fixed Costs) Scheme (Northern Ireland) 2020
77	The Local Government Pension Scheme (Amendment) Regulations (Northern Ireland) 2020
78	The Children’s Social Care (Coronavirus) (Temporary Modification of Children’s Social Care) Regulations (Northern Ireland) 2020
79	The Education (Student Support) (Amendment) Regulations (Northern Ireland) 2020
80	The Food Information (Amendment No. 2) Regulations (Northern Ireland) 2020
81	The Direct Payments to Farmers Single Application Amendment Date (Amendment) (Coronavirus) Regulations (Northern Ireland) 2020
82	The Health Protection (Coronavirus, Restrictions) (Amendment No. 2) Regulations (Northern Ireland) 2020(revoked)
83	The Census Order (Northern Ireland) 2020
84	The Health Protection (Coronavirus, Restrictions) (Amendment No. 3) Regulations (Northern Ireland) 2020 (revoked)
85	The Universal Credit (Coronavirus) (Self-employed Claimants and Reclaims) (Amendment) Regulations (Northern Ireland) 2020
86	The Health Protection (Coronavirus, Restrictions) (Amendment No. 4) Regulations (Northern Ireland) 2020 (revoked)
87	The Social Security (Coronavirus) (Electronic Communications) (Amendment) Order (Northern Ireland) 2020
88	The Motor Vehicles (Wearing of Seat Belts) (Amendment) Regulations (Northern Ireland) 2020
89	The Statutory Sick Pay (General) (Coronavirus Amendment) (No. 4) Regulations (Northern Ireland) 2020
90	The Health Protection (Coronavirus, International Travel) Regulations (Northern Ireland) 2020
91	The Rates (Small Business Hereditament Relief) (Amendment) Regulations (Northern Ireland) 2020
92	The Rates (Coronavirus) (Emergency Relief) Regulations (Northern Ireland) 2020
93	The Sexual Offences Act 2003 (Prescribed Police Stations) Regulations (Northern Ireland) 2020
94	The Direct Payments to Farmers (Penalty Simplification) Regulations (Northern Ireland) 2020
95	The Sea Fish Industry (Coronavirus) (Fixed Costs) (Amendment) Scheme (Northern Ireland) 2020
96	The Health Protection (Coronavirus, Restrictions) (Amendment No. 5) Regulations (Northern Ireland) 2020 (revoked)
97	The Health Protection (Coronavirus, Public Health Advice for Persons Travelling to Northern Ireland) Regulations (Northern Ireland) 2020
98	The Student Fees (Amounts) (Amendment) Regulations (Northern Ireland) 2020
99	The Drumnagoon Road and Kernan Hill Road, Portadown (Abandonment) Order (Northern Ireland) 2020
100	The Footpath at Mowhan Road and Bunker Hill, Markethill (Abandonment) Order (Northern Ireland) 2020

== 101-200 ==
Number	Title
101	The Kernan Road, Portadown (Footpath) (Abandonment) Order (Northern Ireland) 2020
102	The Craigs Road, Carrickfergus (Abandonment) Order (Northern Ireland) 2020
103	The Health Protection (Coronavirus, Restrictions) (Amendment No. 6) Regulations (Northern Ireland) 2020 (revoked)
104	The Misuse of Drugs (Amendment No. 2) Regulations (Northern Ireland) 2020
105	The Direct Payments to Farmers (Controls and Checks) (Amendment) (Coronavirus) Regulations (Northern Ireland) 2020
106	The Mental Capacity (Deprivation of Liberty) (Amendment) (Revocation) Regulations (Northern Ireland) 2020
107	The Universal Credit (Miscellaneous Amendments) Regulations (Northern Ireland) 2020
108	The Social Security (Income and Capital) (Miscellaneous Amendments) Regulations (Northern Ireland) 2020
109	The Health Protection (Coronavirus, Restrictions) (Amendment No. 7) Regulations (Northern Ireland) 2020 (revoked)
110	The Rates (Exemption for Automatic Telling Machines in Rural Areas) Order (Northern Ireland) 2020
111	The Business Tenancies (Coronavirus) (Restriction on Forfeiture: Relevant Period) (Northern Ireland) Regulations 2020
112	The Waste (Fees and Charges) (Amendment) Regulations (Northern Ireland) 2020
113	The Attorney General’s Human Rights Guidance (The Application of Section 5 of the Criminal Law Act (Northern Ireland) 1967 to Victims of Serious Sexual Offences and those to whom they make Disclosures) Order (Northern Ireland) 2020
114	The Taxis (Portstewart) Order (Northern Ireland) 2020
115	The Taxis (Carrickfergus) Order (Northern Ireland) 2020
116	The Census Regulations (Northern Ireland) 2020
117	The Northern Ireland Screen Commission (Funding) Order (Northern Ireland) 2020
118	The Health Protection (Coronavirus, Restrictions) (Amendment No. 8) Regulations (Northern Ireland) 2020 (revoked)
119	The Universal Credit (Persons who have attained state pension credit qualifying age) (Amendment) Regulations (Northern Ireland) 2020
120	The Local Government (Accounts and Audit) (Coronavirus) (Amendment) Regulations (Northern Ireland) 2020
121	The Health Protection (Coronavirus, Restrictions) (Amendment No. 9) Regulations (Northern Ireland) 2020 (revoked)
122 - 124	Not Allocated
125	The Loans for Mortgage Interest (Transaction Fee) (Amendment) Regulations (Northern Ireland) 2020
126 & 127	Not Allocated
128	The Health Protection (Coronavirus, Restrictions) (Amendment No. 10) Regulations (Northern Ireland) 2020 (revoked)
129	The Universal Credit (Great Britain Reciprocal Arrangements) Regulations (Northern Ireland) 2020
130	The Universal Credit (Persons of Northern Ireland - Family Members) (Amendment) Regulations (Northern Ireland) 2020
131	The Drought (Altnahinch Impounding Reservoir) Order (Northern Ireland) 2020
132	The Drought (Blacksprings Emergency Abstraction) Order (Northern Ireland) 2020
133	The Drought (Spelga Impounding Reservoir) Order (Northern Ireland) 2020
134	The Statutory Sick Pay (Coronavirus) (Suspension of Waiting Days and General Amendment) (No.2) Regulations (Northern Ireland) 2020
135	The Salaries (Public Services Ombudsman) Order (Northern Ireland) 2020
136	The Industrial Training Levy (Construction Industry) Order (Northern Ireland) 2020
137	The Road Races (Garron Point Hill Climb) Order (Northern Ireland) 2020
138	The Health Protection (Coronavirus, International Travel) (Amendment) Regulations (Northern Ireland) 2020
139	The Health Protection (Coronavirus, Restrictions) (Amendment No. 11) Regulations (Northern Ireland) 2020 (revoked)
140	The Health Protection (Coronavirus, International Travel) (Amendment No. 2) Regulations (Northern Ireland) 2020
141	The Coronavirus Act 2020 (Suspension) Order (Northern Ireland) 2020
142	The Mental Health (1986 Order) (Amendment No. 2) Order (Northern Ireland) 2020
143	No Allocated
144	The Rates (Coronavirus) (Emergency Relief) (No. 2) Regulations (Northern Ireland) 2020
145	The Education (Student Support) (Amendment) (No.2) Regulations (Northern Ireland) 2020
146	The Mental Health (Nurses, Guardianship, Consent to Treatment and Prescribed Forms) (Amendment) Regulations (Northern Ireland) 2020
147	The Social Security (Electronic Communications) (Amendment) Order (Northern Ireland) 2020
148	The Social Fund and Social Security (Claims and Payments) (Amendment) Regulations (Northern Ireland) 2020
149	The Social Security (Income-related Benefits) (Persons of Northern Ireland – Family Members) (Amendment) Regulations (Northern Ireland) 2020
150	The Health Protection (Coronavirus, Restrictions) (No. 2) Regulations (Northern Ireland) 2020
151	The Health Protection (Coronavirus, Wearing of Face Coverings) Regulations (Northern Ireland) 2020
152	The Edible Crabs (Conservation) Regulations (Northern Ireland) 2020
153	The Edible Crabs (Undersized) Order (Northern Ireland) 2020
154	The Health Protection (Coronavirus, International Travel) (Amendment No. 3) Regulations (Northern Ireland) 2020
155	The Health Protection (Coronavirus, International Travel) (Amendment No. 4) Regulations (Northern Ireland) 2020
156	The Parking and Waiting Restrictions (Ballyclare) (Amendment) Order (Northern Ireland) 2020
157	The Parking and Waiting Restrictions (Kilkeel) Order (Northern Ireland) 2020
158	The Taxis (Magherafelt) Order (Northern Ireland) 2020
159	The Parking Places on Roads and Waiting Restrictions (Magherafelt) (Amendment) Order (Northern Ireland) 2020
160	The Rates (Automatic Telling Machines) (Designation of Rural Areas) Order (Northern Ireland) 2020
161	The Valuation (Telecommunications, Natural Gas and Water) (Amendment) Regulations (Northern Ireland) 2020
162	The Pension Protection Fund (Moratorium and Arrangements for Companies in Financial Difficulty) Regulations (Northern Ireland) 2020
163	The Health Protection (Coronavirus, International Travel) (Amendment No. 5) Regulations (Northern Ireland) 2020
164	The Health Protection (Coronavirus, Wearing of Face Coverings) (Amendment) Regulations (Northern Ireland) 2020
165	The Universal Credit (Managed Migration and Miscellaneous Amendments) (Amendment) Regulations (Northern Ireland) 2020
166	The Universal Credit (Exceptions to the Requirement not to be receiving Education) (Amendment) Regulations (Northern Ireland) 2020
167	The Statutory Sick Pay (General) (Coronavirus Amendment) (No. 5) Regulations (Northern Ireland) 2020
168	The Health Protection (Coronavirus, International Travel) (Amendment No. 6) Regulations (Northern Ireland) 2020
169 (C. 4)	The Health Protection (Coronavirus, Wearing of Face Coverings) (Amendment) Regulations (Northern Ireland) 2020 (Commencement) Order (Northern Ireland) 2020
170	The Health Protection (Coronavirus, Restrictions) (No. 2) (Amendment) Regulations (Northern Ireland) 2020
171	The Parking and Waiting Restrictions (Newtownards) (Amendment) Order (Northern Ireland) 2020
172	The Parking Places, Loading Bay and Waiting Restrictions (Portstewart) (Amendment) Order (Northern Ireland) 2020
173	The Roads (Speed Limit) Order (Northern Ireland) 2020
174	The Parking and Waiting Restrictions (Newtownabbey) Order (Northern Ireland) 2020
175	The Parking Places on Roads and Waiting Restrictions (Newry) (Amendment) Order (Northern Ireland) 2020
176	The Road Races (Cookstown 100) Order (Northern Ireland) 2020
177	The Ormeau Road, Belfast (Footway) (Abandonment) Order (Northern Ireland) 2020
178	The Employment Rights (Northern Ireland) Order 1996 (Coronavirus, Calculation of a Week’s Pay) Regulations (Northern Ireland) 2020
179	The Health Protection (Coronavirus, International Travel and Public Health Advice for Persons Travelling to Northern Ireland) (Amendment) Regulations (Northern Ireland) 2020
180	The A29 New Road and B30 Newry Road, Silverbridge (Abandonment) Order (Northern Ireland) 2020
181	The Whitla Street, Belfast (Abandonment) Order (Northern Ireland) 2020
182	The Railway Avenue, Newry (Abandonment) Order (Northern Ireland) 2020
183	The Back Street at Duncairn Gardens, Belfast (Abandonment) Order (Northern Ireland) 2020
184	The Footpath to the rear of Albert Street, Quadrant Place and Cullingtree Road, Belfast (Abandonment) Order (Northern Ireland) 2020
185	The Health Protection (Coronavirus, International Travel) (Amendment No. 7) Regulations (Northern Ireland) 2020
186	The Statutory Sick Pay (General) (Coronavirus Amendment) (No. 6) Regulations (Northern Ireland) 2020
187	The Health Protection (Coronavirus, Restrictions) (No. 2) (Amendment No. 2) Regulations (Northern Ireland) 2020
188	The Motor Vehicles (Driving Licences) (Amendment) (Coronavirus) Regulations (Northern Ireland) 2020
189	The Health Protection (Coronavirus, International Travel) (Amendment No. 8) Regulations (Northern Ireland) 2020
190	The Taxi Licensing (Amendment No. 2) (Coronavirus) Regulations (Northern Ireland) 2020
191	The Agricultural Commodities (Coronavirus)(Income Support) Scheme (Northern Ireland) 2020
192	The Private Tenancies (Coronavirus Modifications) Regulations (Northern Ireland) 2020
193	The Health Protection (Coronavirus, International Travel) (Amendment No. 9) Regulations (Northern Ireland) 2020
194	The Health Protection (Coronavirus, International Travel) (Amendment No. 10) Regulations (Northern Ireland) 2020
195	The Health Protection (Coronavirus, Restrictions) (No. 2) (Amendment No. 3) Regulations (Northern Ireland) 2020
196	The Goods Vehicles (Testing) (Amendment) Regulations (Northern Ireland) 2020
197	The Motor Vehicle Testing (Amendment) Regulations (Northern Ireland) 2020
198	The Health Protection (Coronavirus, Restrictions) (No. 2) (Amendment No. 4) Regulations (Northern Ireland) 2020
199	The Corporate Insolvency and Governance Act 2020 (Amendment of Certain Relevant Periods) Regulations (Northern Ireland) 2020
200	The Health Protection (Coronavirus, International Travel) (Amendment No. 11) Regulations (Northern Ireland) 2020

== 201-360 ==
Number	Title
201	The Rates (Coronavirus) (Electronic Communications) Order (Northern Ireland) 2020
202	The Health Protection (Coronavirus, Restrictions) (No. 2) (Amendment No. 5) Regulations (Northern Ireland) 2020
203	The Health Protection (Coronavirus, International Travel) (Amendment No. 12) Regulations (Northern Ireland) 2020
204	The Health Protection (Coronavirus, Restrictions) (No. 2) (Amendment No. 6) Regulations (Northern Ireland) 2020
205	The Motorways Traffic (Amendment No. 2) Regulations (Northern Ireland) 2020
206	The Coolshinney Park, Magherafelt (Abandonment) Order (Northern Ireland) 2020
207	The Llewellyn Drive, Lisburn (Abandonment) Order (Northern Ireland) 2020
208	The Planning (Development Management) (Temporary Modifications) (Coronavirus) (Amendment) Regulations (Northern Ireland) 2020
209	The Business Tenancies (Coronavirus) (Restriction on Forfeiture: Relevant Period) (Northern Ireland) (No 2) Regulations 2020
210	The Health Protection (Coronavirus, Restrictions) (No. 2) (Amendment No. 7) Regulations (Northern Ireland) 2020
211	The Corporate Insolvency and Governance Act 2020 (Coronavirus) (Amendment of Relevant Period for Meetings of Registered Societies and Credit Unions) Regulations (Northern Ireland) 2020
212	The Health Protection (Coronavirus, International Travel) (Amendment No. 13) Regulations (Northern Ireland) 2020
213	The Health Protection (Coronavirus, Restrictions) (No. 2) (Amendment No. 8) Regulations (Northern Ireland) 2020
214	The Corporate Insolvency and Governance Act 2020 (Coronavirus) (Schedule 8) (Early Termination of Certain Temporary Provisions) Regulations (Northern Ireland) 2020
215	The Health Protection (Coronavirus, Public Health Advice for Persons Travelling to Northern Ireland) (No. 2) Regulations (Northern Ireland) 2020
216	The Health Protection (Coronavirus, International Travel) (Amendment No. 14) Regulations (Northern Ireland) 2020
217	The Employment and Support Allowance and Universal Credit (Coronavirus) (Amendment) Regulations (Northern Ireland) 2020
218	The Planning Act 2011 (Review) Regulations (Northern Ireland) 2020
219	The Ornamental Horticulture Industry (Coronavirus, Financial Assistance) Scheme Regulations (Northern Ireland) 2020
220	The Health Protection (Coronavirus, Wearing of Face Coverings) (Amendment No. 2) Regulations (Northern Ireland) 2020
221	The Financial Assistance (Coronavirus) Regulations (Northern Ireland) 2020
222	The Carriage of Dangerous Goods and Use of Transportable Pressure Equipment (Amendment) Regulations (Northern Ireland) 2020
223	The Health Protection (Coronavirus, International Travel) (Amendment No. 15) Regulations (Northern Ireland) 2020
224	The Health Protection (Coronavirus, Restrictions) (No. 2) (Amendment No. 9) Regulations (Northern Ireland) 2020
225	The Health Protection (Coronavirus, Restrictions) (No. 2) (Amendment No. 10) Regulations (Northern Ireland) 2020
226	The Universal Credit (Earned Income) (Amendment) Regulations (Northern Ireland) 2020
227	The Social Security (Coronavirus) (Prisoners) (Amendment) Regulations (Northern Ireland) 2020
228	The Health Protection (Coronavirus, International Travel) (Amendment No. 16) Regulations (Northern Ireland) 2020
229 (C. 5)	The Historical Institutional Abuse (Northern Ireland) Act 2019 (Commencement No. 2) Order (Northern Ireland) 2020
230	The Financial Assistance (Coronavirus) (No. 2) Regulations (Northern Ireland) 2020
231	The Licensing (Designation of Outdoor Stadia) Regulations (Northern Ireland) 2020
232	The Health Protection (Coronavirus, Restrictions) (No. 2) (Amendment No. 11) Regulations (Northern Ireland) 2020
233	The Health Protection (Coronavirus, Wearing of Face Coverings) (Amendment No. 3) Regulations (Northern Ireland) 2020
234	The Health Protection (Coronavirus, International Travel) (Amendment No. 17) Regulations (Northern Ireland) 2020
235	The Children’s Social Care (Coronavirus) (Temporary Modification of Children’s Social Care) (Amendment) Regulations (Northern Ireland) 2020
236 (C. 6)	The Insolvency (Amendment) (2016 Act) (Commencement No. 2 and Saving Provision) Order (Northern Ireland) 2020
237 & 238	Not Allocated
239	The Health Protection (Coronavirus, Restrictions) (No. 2) (Amendment No. 12) Regulations (Northern Ireland) 2020
240 (C. 7)	The Road Traffic (Amendment) (2016 Act) (Commencement No. 2) Order (Northern Ireland) 2020
241	The Health Protection (Coronavirus, International Travel) (Amendment No. 18) Regulations (Northern Ireland) 2020
242	The Social Security (Coronavirus) (Further Measures) (Amendment) and Miscellaneous Amendment Regulations (Northern Ireland) 2020
243	The Health Protection (Coronavirus, International Travel) (Amendment No. 19) Regulations (Northern Ireland) 2020 (revoked)
244	The Health Protection (Coronavirus, International Travel) (Amendment No. 20) Regulations (Northern Ireland) 2020 (revoked)
245	The Personal Independence Payment (Amendment) Regulations (Northern Ireland) 2020
246 (C. 8)	The Mental Capacity (2016 Act) (Commencement No.1) (Amendment) Order (Northern Ireland) 2020
247	The Health Protection (Coronavirus, Travel from Denmark) Regulations (Northern Ireland) 2020 (revoked)
248	The Maximum Number of Judges Order (Northern Ireland) 2020
249	The Taxi Driver (Coronavirus, Financial Assistance) Regulations (Northern Ireland) 2020
250	The Health Protection (Coronavirus, Restrictions) (No. 2) (Amendment No. 13) Regulations (Northern Ireland) 2020
251	The Posted Workers (Agency Workers) Order (Northern Ireland) 2020
252	The Regulation (EC) No 1370/2007 (Public Service Obligations in Transport) (Amendment) (EU Exit) (Northern Ireland) Regulations 2020
253	The Health Protection (Coronavirus, Wearing of Face Coverings) (Amendment No. 4) Regulations (Northern Ireland) 2020
254	The Health Protection (Coronavirus, International Travel) (Amendment No. 21) Regulations (Northern Ireland) 2020
255	The Health Protection (Coronavirus, Restrictions) (No. 2) (Amendment No. 14) Regulations (Northern Ireland) 2020
256	The Health Protection (Coronavirus, Restrictions) (No. 2) (Amendment No. 15) Regulations (Northern Ireland) 2020
257	The Parking Places (Disabled Persons’ Vehicles) (Amendment No. 2) Order (Northern Ireland) 2020
258	The Killyvally Road, Garvagh (Abandonment) Order (Northern Ireland) 2020
259	The Roads (Speed Limit) (No. 2) Order (Northern Ireland) 2020
260	The Roads (Speed Limit) (No. 3) Order (Northern Ireland) 2020
261	The Health Protection (Coronavirus, Travel from Denmark) (Amendment) Regulations (Northern Ireland) 2020 (revoked)
262	The Financial Assistance (Coronavirus) (No. 2) (Amendment) Regulations (Northern Ireland) 2020
263	The Parking Places (Disabled Persons’ Vehicles) (Amendment No. 3) Order (Northern Ireland) 2020
264	The Parking and Waiting Restrictions (Dromore) Order (Northern Ireland) 2020
265	The Seagoe Industrial Estate, Craigavon (Abandonment) Order (Northern Ireland) 2020
266	The Roads (Speed Limit) (No. 4) Order (Northern Ireland) 2020
267	The Food Hygiene Rating Act (Amendment) Regulations (Northern Ireland) 2020
268	The Pesticides and Invasive Alien Species (Enforcement and Permitting)(Amendment)(EU Exit) Regulations (Northern Ireland) 2020
269	The Genetically Modified Organisms (Amendment)(EU Exit) Regulations (Northern Ireland) 2020
270	The Parking Places (Disabled Persons’ Vehicles) (Amendment No. 4) Order (Northern Ireland) 2020
271	The Mount Pleasant, Townhill Road, Portglenone (Stopping-Up) Order (Northern Ireland) 2020
272	The Organic Products Regulations (Northern Ireland) 2020
273	The A26 Crankill Road Central Reservation, Ballymena (Stopping-Up) Order (Northern Ireland) 2020
274	The Health Protection (Coronavirus, Restrictions) (No. 2) (Amendment No. 16) Regulations (Northern Ireland) 2020
275	The Health Protection (Coronavirus, International Travel) (Amendment No. 22) Regulations (Northern Ireland) 2020
276	The Port Services (Amendment) (EU Exit) Regulations (Northern Ireland) 2020
277	The Railways (Amendment) (EU Exit) Regulations (Northern Ireland) 2020
278	The Health Protection (Coronavirus, International Travel) (Amendment No. 23) Regulations (Northern Ireland) 2020
279	The Gas (Internal Markets) Regulations (Northern Ireland) 2020
280	The Administration of Estates (Small Payments) (Increase of Limit) Order (Northern Ireland) 2020
281	The Employment Rights (Northern Ireland) Order 1996 (Coronavirus, Calculation of a Week’s Pay) (Amendment) Regulations (Northern Ireland) 2020
282	The Bus Operator (Coronavirus, Financial Assistance) Regulations (Northern Ireland) 2020
283	The Occupational Pensions (Revaluation) Order (Northern Ireland) 2020
284	The Waste (Amendment) (EU Exit) Regulations (Northern Ireland) 2020
285	The Waste (Circular Economy) (Amendment) Regulations (Northern Ireland) 2020
286	The Food (Miscellaneous Amendments etc.) (EU Exit) Regulations (Northern Ireland) 2020
287	The Health Protection (Coronavirus, Restrictions) (No. 2) (Amendment No. 17) Regulations (Northern Ireland) 2020
288	The Health Protection (Coronavirus, Travel from Denmark) (Revocation) Regulations (Northern Ireland) 2020
289	The Health Protection (Coronavirus, International Travel) (Amendment No. 24) Regulations (Northern Ireland) 2020
290	The Health Protection (Coronavirus, Restrictions) (No. 2) (Amendment No. 18) Regulations (Northern Ireland) 2020
291	The Food and Feed Hygiene and Safety (Miscellaneous Amendments) Regulations (Northern Ireland) 2020
292	The Planning (General Permitted Development) (Amendment) Order (Northern Ireland) 2020
293	The Plant Health (Official Controls and Miscellaneous Provisions) Regulations (Northern Ireland) 2020
294	The Marketing of Fruit Plant and Propagating Material (Amendment) Regulations (Northern Ireland) 2020
295	The Education (Student Fees and Support) (Amendment etc.) (EU Exit) Regulations (Northern Ireland) 2020
296	The Further Education (Student Support) (Eligibility) (Amendment etc.) (EU Exit) Regulations (Northern Ireland) 2020
297	The State Pension Debits and Credits (Revaluation) (No.2) Order (Northern Ireland) 2020
298	The State Pension Revaluation for Transitional Pensions (No.2) Order (Northern Ireland) 2020
299	The Motor Vehicles (Driving Licences) (Amendment No. 2) (Coronavirus) Regulations (Northern Ireland) 2020
300	The Planning (Environmental Assessments and Technical Miscellaneous Amendments) (EU Exit) Regulations (Northern Ireland) 2020
301	The Seed Marketing (Amendment) Regulations (Northern Ireland) 2020
302	The Seeds (Variety Lists) Regulations (Northern Ireland) 2020
303	The EU Fertilising Products Regulations (Northern Ireland) 2020
304	The Fluorinated Greenhouse Gases and Ozone-Depleting Substances (Amendment) (EU Exit) Regulations (Northern Ireland) 2020
305	The Gas (Amendment) (EU Exit) Regulations (Northern Ireland) 2020
306	The Electricity (Priority Dispatch) Regulations (Northern Ireland) 2020
307	The Electricity (Internal Markets) Regulations (Northern Ireland) 2020
308	The Rate Relief (Coronavirus) (Amendment) Regulations (Northern Ireland) 2020
309	The Special Educational Needs and Disability (2016 Act) (Commencement No. 2) Order (Northern Ireland) 2020
310	The Addition of Vitamins, Minerals and Other Substances (Amendment) Regulations (Northern Ireland) 2020
311	The Parking and Waiting Restrictions (Donaghmore) Order (Northern Ireland) 2020
312	The Parking Places on Roads and Waiting Restrictions (Cookstown) (Amendment) Order (Northern Ireland) 2020
313	The Parking Places on Roads and Waiting Restrictions (Newry) (Amendment No. 2) Order (Northern Ireland) 2020
314	The Waiting Restrictions (Lisburn) (Amendment) Order (Northern Ireland) 2020
315	The Parking Places on Roads (Coaches) (Amendment) Order (Northern Ireland) 2020
316	The Parking and Waiting Restrictions (Londonderry) (Amendment) Order (Northern Ireland) 2020
317	Not Allocated
318	The Pension Protection Fund (State Aid) (Amendment) (EU Exit) Regulations (Northern Ireland) 2020
319	The Seed Marketing and Fertilisers (Amendment) (EU Exit) Regulations (Northern Ireland) 2020
320	The Corporate Insolvency and Governance Act 2020 (Coronavirus) (Suspension of Liability for Wrongful Trading) Regulations (Northern Ireland) 2020
321	The Corporate Insolvency and Governance Act 2020 (Amendment of Certain Relevant Periods) (No. 2) Regulations (Northern Ireland) 2020
322	The Seed Marketing (Amendment) (No. 2) Regulations (Northern Ireland) 2020
323	The Health Protection (Coronavirus, Restrictions) (No. 2) (Amendment No. 19) Regulations (Northern Ireland) 2020
324	The Agriculture, Animals and Aquaculture (Health, Identification, Welfare, Trade etc.) (Amendment) (EU Exit) Regulations (Northern Ireland) 2020
325	The Health Protection (Coronavirus, Public Health Advice for Persons Travelling to Northern Ireland) (No. 2) (Amendment) Regulations (Northern Ireland) 2020
326	The Health Protection (Coronavirus, International Travel) (Amendment No. 25) Regulations (Northern Ireland) 2020
327	The Plant Health and Diseases of Animals (Amendment) (EU Exit) Regulations (Northern Ireland) 2020
328	The Horses (Free Access to Competitions) (Amendment) Regulations (Northern Ireland) 2020
329	The Horses (Free Access to Competitions) (Amendment) Regulations (Northern Ireland) 2020
330	The Health and Safety (Amendments and Revocation) (EU Exit) Regulations (Northern Ireland) 2020
331	The Corporate Insolvency and Governance Act 2020 (Coronavirus) (Amendment of Relevant Period for Meetings of Registered Societies and Credit Unions No. 2) Regulations (Northern Ireland) 2020
332	The Business Tenancies (Coronavirus) (Restriction on Forfeiture: Relevant Period) (Northern Ireland) (No. 3) Regulations 2020
333	The Alien and Locally Absent Species (Aquaculture) (Amendment) (EU Exit) Regulations (Northern Ireland) 2020
334	The Road Traffic Offenders (Northern Ireland) (Amendment) Order 2020
335	The Health Protection (Coronavirus, Restrictions) (No. 2) (Amendment No. 20) Regulations (Northern Ireland) 2020
336	The Road Traffic (Fixed Penalty) (Amendment) Order (Northern Ireland) 2020
337	Not Allocated
338	The Regulation (EC) No 1370/2007 (Public Service Obligations in Transport) (Amendment) (EU Exit) (Northern Ireland) (Revocation) Regulations 2020
339	The Marketing of Plant and Propagating Material (Legislative Functions) (Amendment) (EU Exit) Regulations (Northern Ireland) 2020
340	The Carriage of Explosives (Amendment) (EU Exit) Regulations (Northern Ireland) 2020
341	The Addition of Vitamins, Minerals and Other Substances (Amendment) (Revocation) Regulations (Northern Ireland) 2020
342	The Financial Assistance (Coronavirus) (Airports) Regulations (Northern Ireland) 2020
343	The Health Protection (Coronavirus, Restrictions) (No. 2) (Amendment No. 21) Regulations (Northern Ireland) 2020
344	The Health Protection (Coronavirus, International Travel) (Amendment No. 26) Regulations (Northern Ireland) 2020
345	The Producer Responsibility Obligations (Packaging Waste) (Amendment) Regulations (Northern Ireland) 2020
346	The Health Protection (Coronavirus, Restrictions) (No. 2) (Amendment No. 22) Regulations (Northern Ireland) 2020
347	The Social Security (Iceland, Liechtenstein and Norway) (Citizens’ Rights Agreement) (Revocation) Order (Northern Ireland) 2020
348	The Social Security (Switzerland) (Citizens’ Rights Agreement) (Revocation) Order (Northern Ireland) 2020
349	The Human Medicines (Coronavirus and Influenza) (Amendment) Regulations 2020
350	The Human Medicines (Coronavirus) (Further Amendments) Regulations 2020
351	The Statutory Sick Pay (General) (Coronavirus Amendment) (No. 7) Regulations (Northern Ireland) 2020
352	The Health Protection (Coronavirus, Restrictions) (No. 2) (Amendment No. 23) Regulations (Northern Ireland) 2020
353	The Animals (Health, Identification, Trade and Veterinary Medicines) (Amendment) (EU Exit) Regulations (Northern Ireland) 2020
354	The Financial Assistance (Coronavirus) (No. 2) (Amendment No. 2) Regulations (Northern Ireland) 2020
355	The Health Protection (Coronavirus, International Travel) (Amendment No. 27) Regulations (Northern Ireland) 2020
356	The Health Protection (Coronavirus, Restrictions) (No. 2) (Amendment No. 24) Regulations (Northern Ireland) 2020
357	The Social Security (Norway) Order (Northern Ireland) 2020
358	The Health Protection (Coronavirus, Restrictions) (No. 2) (Amendment No. 25) Regulations (Northern Ireland) 2020
359	The Marketing of Seed Potatoes, Plant and Propagating Material Regulations (Northern Ireland) 2020
360	The Official Controls (Plant Protection Products) Regulations (Northern Ireland) 2020.

== See also ==
- List of acts of the Northern Ireland Assembly from 2020
- List of acts of the Parliament of the United Kingdom from 2020
