= List of acts of the Northern Ireland Assembly from 2025 =

This is a list of acts of the Northern Ireland Assembly passed in 2025. Acts of the Northern Ireland Assembly are enacted by the Northern Ireland Assembly, which has legislative authority over devolved matters in relation to Northern Ireland under the authority of the Northern Ireland Act 1998. Acts are cited by calendar year, in the same fashion as acts of Parliament of the United Kingdom. Each act passed in a respective year is given a chapter number (abbreviated "c.") denoted by Arabic numerals, and citations are usually followed by the suffix "(N.I.)" so as to prevent confusion with acts of Parliament of the United Kingdom.

6 acts of the Northern Ireland Assembly were passed in 2025.

indicates that an act has been transcribed on Wikisource, indicates that an act is available to view at legislation.gov.uk, and indicates the location of the original act in the Parliamentary Archives.

== Acts of the Northern Ireland Assembly ==
Short title	Citation	Royal assent
Long title
Budget Act (Northern Ireland) 2025	2025 c. 1 (N.I.)	6 March 2025
An Act to authorise the use for the public service of certain resources for the years ending 31 March 2025 and 2026 (including, for the year ending 31 March 2025, income); to authorise the issue out of the Consolidated Fund of certain sums for the service of those years; to authorise the use of those sums for specified purposes; to authorise the Department of Finance to borrow on the credit of those sums; to authorise the use for the public service of excess resources for the year ending 31 March 2024; to authorise the issue out of the Consolidated Fund of a sum for the service of the year ending 31 March 2024; and to authorise the use of that sum for specified purposes.
Pensions (Extension of Automatic Enrolment) Act (Northern Ireland) 2025	2025 c. 2 (N.I.)	18 June 2025
An Act to make provision about the extension of pensions automatic enrolment to jobholders under the age of 22; to make provision about the lower qualifying earnings threshold for automatic enrolment; and for connected purposes.
Child Support Enforcement Act (Northern Ireland) 2025	2025 c. 3 (N.I.)	19 June 2025
An Act to make provision as to the enforcement of payments of particular amounts due by virtue of certain child support and maintenance legislation.
Budget (No. 2) Act (Northern Ireland) 2025	2025 c. 4 (N.I.)	28 July 2025
An Act to authorise the use for the public service of certain resources for the year ending 31 March 2026 (including income); to authorise the issue out of the Consolidated Fund of certain sums for the service of that year; to authorise the use of those sums for specified purposes; and to authorise the Department of Finance to borrow on the credit of those sums.
Assembly Members (Independent Remuneration Board) Act (Northern Ireland) 2025	2025 c. 5 (N.I.)	16 September 2025
An Act to amend the Assembly Members (Independent Financial Review and Standards) Act (Northern Ireland) 2011 (Note: Assembly Members (Independent Financial Review and Standards) Act (Northern Ireland) 2011 (c. 17 (N.I.))) to make provision about the name, functions and membership of the Independent Financial Review Panel; and for connected purposes.
Agriculture Act (Northern Ireland) 2025	2025 c. 6 (N.I.)	16 September 2025
An Act to make provision for the modification of assimilated direct legislation in relation to aid in the fruit and vegetables sector and information and promotion schemes for agricultural products; and for connected purposes.

== See also ==
- List of acts of the Northern Ireland Assembly
