= List of acts of the Northern Ireland Assembly from 2001 =

This is a list of acts of the Northern Ireland Assembly passed in 2001. Acts of the Northern Ireland Assembly are enacted by the Northern Ireland Assembly, which has legislative authority over devolved matters in relation to Northern Ireland under the authority of the Northern Ireland Act 1998. Acts are cited by calendar year, in the same fashion as acts of Parliament of the United Kingdom. Each act passed in a respective year is given a chapter number (abbreviated "c.") denoted by Arabic numerals, and citations are usually followed by the suffix "(N.I.)" so as to prevent confusion with acts of Parliament of the United Kingdom.

17 acts of the Northern Ireland Assembly were passed in 2001.

indicates that an act has been transcribed on Wikisource, indicates that an act is available to view at legislation.gov.uk, and indicates the location of the original act in the Parliamentary Archives.

== Acts of the Northern Ireland Assembly ==
Short title	Citation	Royal assent
Long title
Dogs (Amendment) Act (Northern Ireland) 2001	2001 c. 1 (N.I.)	29 January 2001
An Act to make provision regarding the destruction of dogs under the Dogs (Northern Ireland) Order 1983. (Note: Dogs (Northern Ireland) Order 1983 (SI 1983/764))
Planning (Compensation, etc.) Act (Northern Ireland) 2001	2001 c. 2 (N.I.)	20 March 2001
An Act to abolish the right to compensation in respect of certain planning decisions; and to amend Article 121(1)(c)(iv) of the Planning (Northern Ireland) Order 1991. (Note: Planning (Northern Ireland) Order 1991 (SI 1991/1220))
Health and Personal Social Services Act (Northern Ireland) 2001	2001 c. 3 (N.I.)	20 March 2001
An Act to establish a Northern Ireland Social Care Council and make provision for the registration, regulation and training of social care workers; to make provision about the recovery of charges in connection with the treatment of road traffic casualties in health services hospitals; to amend the law about the health and personal social services; to confer power to regulate the profession of pharmaceutical chemist; and for connected purposes.
Fisheries (Amendment) Act (Northern Ireland) 2001	2001 c. 4 (N.I.)	20 March 2001
An Act to amend the Fisheries Act (Northern Ireland) 1966. (Note: Fisheries Act (Northern Ireland) 1966 (c. 17 (N.I.))
Ground Rents Act (Northern Ireland) 2001	2001 c. 5 (N.I.)	20 March 2001
An Act to make provision for the redemption of certain ground rents and other periodic payments.
Government Resources and Accounts Act (Northern Ireland) 2001	2001 c. 6 (N.I.)	22 March 2001
An Act to make provision about government resources and accounts; and for connected purposes.
Budget Act (Northern Ireland) 2001	2001 c. 7 (N.I.)	22 March 2001
An Act to authorise the issue out of the Consolidated Fund of certain sums for the service of the years ending 31st March 2001 and 2002; to appropriate those sums for specified purposes and amend certain appropriations in aid for the year ending 31st March 2001; to authorise the Department of Finance and Personnel to borrow on the credit of the appropriated sums; and to authorise the use for the public service of certain resources for the year ending 31st March 2002.
Street Trading Act (Northern Ireland) 2001	2001 c. 8 (N.I.)	5 April 2001
An Act to make provision for the regulation by district councils of street trading in their districts.
Electronic Communications Act (Northern Ireland) 2001	2001 c. 9 (N.I.)	5 April 2001
An Act to make provision to facilitate the use of electronic communications and electronic data storage.
Defective Premises (Landlord's Liability) Act (Northern Ireland) 2001	2001 c. 10 (N.I.)	2 July 2001
An Act to amend the law as to the liability of landlords for injury or damage caused to persons through defects in the state of premises let under certain tenancies.
Adoption (Intercountry Aspects) Act (Northern Ireland) 2001	2001 c. 11 (N.I.)	2 July 2001
An Act to make provision for giving effect to the Convention on Protection of Children and Co-operation in respect of Intercountry Adoption (Note: Hague Adoption Convention) concluded at the Hague on 29th May 1993; to make further provision in relation to adoptions with an international element; and for connected purposes.
Family Law Act (Northern Ireland) 2001	2001 c. 12 (N.I.)	17 July 2001
An Act to make further provision for the acquisition of parental responsibility under Article 7 of the Children (Northern Ireland) Order 1995; (Note: Children (Northern Ireland) Order 1995 (SI 1995/755)) and to provide for certain presumptions of parentage and for tests to determine parentage.
Product Liability (Amendment) Act (Northern Ireland) 2001	2001 c. 13 (N.I.)	20 July 2001
An Act to amend Part II of the Consumer Protection (Northern Ireland) Order 1987. (Note: Consumer Protection (Northern Ireland) Order 1987 (SI 1987/2049))
Trustee Act (Northern Ireland) 2001	2001 c. 14 (N.I.)	20 July 2001
An Act to amend the law relating to trustees and persons having the investment powers of trustees; and for connected purposes.
Department for Employment and Learning Act (Northern Ireland) 2001 (repealed)	2001 c. 15 (N.I.)	20 July 2001
An Act to rename the Department of Higher and Further Education, Training and Employment as the Department for Employment and Learning. (Repealed by Departments Act (Northern Ireland) 2016 (c. 5 (N.I.)))
Budget (No. 2) Act (Northern Ireland) 2001	2001 c. 16 (N.I.)	20 July 2001
An Act to authorise the issue out of the Consolidated Fund of certain sums for the service of the year ending 31st March 2002; to appropriate those sums for specified purposes; to authorise the Department of Finance and Personnel to borrow on the credit of the appropriated sums; to authorise the use for the public service of certain resources (including accruing resources) for the year ending 31st March 2002; and to repeal certain spent enactments.
Social Security Fraud Act (Northern Ireland) 2001	2001 c. 17 (N.I.)	15 November 2001
An Act to make provision, for the purposes of the law relating to social security, about the obtaining and disclosure of information; and to make provision for restricting the payment of social security benefits in the case of persons convicted of offences relating to such benefits and about the institution of proceedings for such offences; and for connected purposes.
