= List of acts of the Northern Ireland Assembly from 2008 =

This is a list of acts of the Northern Ireland Assembly passed in 2008. Acts of the Northern Ireland Assembly are enacted by the Northern Ireland Assembly, which has legislative authority over devolved matters in relation to Northern Ireland under the authority of the Northern Ireland Act 1998. Acts are cited by calendar year, in the same fashion as acts of Parliament of the United Kingdom. Each act passed in a respective year is given a chapter number (abbreviated "c.") denoted by Arabic numerals, and citations are usually followed by the suffix "(N.I.)" so as to prevent confusion with acts of Parliament of the United Kingdom.

13 acts of the Northern Ireland Assembly were passed in 2008.

indicates that an act has been transcribed on Wikisource, indicates that an act is available to view at legislation.gov.uk, and indicates the location of the original act in the Parliamentary Archives.

== Acts of the Northern Ireland Assembly ==
Short title	Citation	Royal assent
Long title
Pensions Act (Northern Ireland) 2008	2008 c. 1 (N.I.)	11 February 2008
An Act to make provision about pensions and other benefits payable to persons in connection with bereavement or by reference to pensionable age; to make provision about the functions of the Personal Accounts Delivery Authority; and for connected purposes.
Health (Miscellaneous Provisions) Act (Northern Ireland) 2008	2008 c. 2 (N.I.)	25 February 2008
An Act to amend the Health and Personal Social Services (Northern Ireland) Order 1972 (Note: Health and Personal Social Services (Northern Ireland) Order 1972 (SI 1972/1265)) in relation to the provision of health care; and for connected purposes.
Budget Act (Northern Ireland) 2008 (repealed)	2008 c. 3 (N.I.)	12 March 2008
An Act to authorise the issue out of the Consolidated Fund of certain sums for the service of the years ending 31st March 2008 and 2009; to appropriate those sums for specified purposes; to authorise the Department of Finance and Personnel to borrow on the credit of the appropriated sums; to authorise the use for the public service of certain resources for the years ending 31st March 2008 and 2009; and to revise the limits on the use of certain accruing resources in the year ending 31st March 2008. (Repealed by Budget (No. 2) Act (Northern Ireland) 2011 (c. 29 (N.I.)))
Taxis Act (Northern Ireland) 2008	2008 c. 4 (N.I.)	21 April 2008
An Act to make provision regulating taxi operators, taxis and taxi drivers; and for related purposes.
Public Health (Amendment) Act (Northern Ireland) 2008	2008 c. 5 (N.I.)	6 May 2008
An Act to amend section 2A of the Public Health Act (Northern Ireland) 1967. (Note: Public Health Act (Northern Ireland) 1967 (c. 36 (N.I.)))
Commission for Victims and Survivors Act (Northern Ireland) 2008	2008 c. 6 (N.I.)	23 May 2008
An Act to replace the Commissioner for Victims and Survivors for Northern Ireland established by the Victims and Survivors (Northern Ireland) Order 2006 (Note: Victims and Survivors (Northern Ireland) Order 2006 (SI 2006/2953)) with a Commission for Victims and Survivors for Northern Ireland.
Local Government (Boundaries) Act (Northern Ireland) 2008	2008 c. 7 (N.I.)	23 May 2008
An Act to provide for 11 local government districts in Northern Ireland, for the division of those districts into wards, for the appointment of a Local Government Boundaries Commissioner to recommend the boundaries and names of those districts and wards and the number of wards in each district; and for connected purposes.
Libraries Act (Northern Ireland) 2008	2008 c. 8 (N.I.)	17 June 2008
An Act to provide for the establishment and functions of the Northern Ireland Library Authority; to enable the Department of Culture, Arts and Leisure to make grants in connection with the provision of library services; and for connected purposes.
Mesothelioma, etc., Act (Northern Ireland) 2008	2008 c. 9 (N.I.)	2 July 2008
An Act to make provision about lump sum payments to or in respect of persons with diffuse mesothelioma; and for connected purposes.
Child Maintenance Act (Northern Ireland) 2008	2008 c. 10 (N.I.)	2 July 2008
An Act to amend the law relating to child support; and for connected purposes.
Budget (No. 2) Act (Northern Ireland) 2008 (repealed)	2008 c. 11 (N.I.)	2 July 2008
An Act to authorise the issue out of the Consolidated Fund of certain sums for the service of the year ending 31st March 2009; to appropriate those sums for specified purposes; to authorise the Department of Finance and Personnel to borrow on the credit of the appropriated sums; to authorise the use for the public service of certain resources (including accruing resources) for the year ending 31st March 2009; to authorise the issue out of the Consolidated Fund of an excess cash sum for the service of the year ending 31st March 2007; and to repeal certain spent provisions. (Repealed by Budget (No. 2) Act (Northern Ireland) 2011 (c. 29 (N.I.)))
Charities Act (Northern Ireland) 2008	2008 c. 12 (N.I.)	9 September 2008
An Act to provide for the establishment and functions of the Charity Commission for Northern Ireland and the Charity Tribunal for Northern Ireland; to make provision about the law of charities, including provision about charitable incorporated organisations; to make further provision about public charitable collections and other fund-raising carried on in connection with charities and other institutions; and for connected purposes.
Pensions (No. 2) Act (Northern Ireland) 2008	2008 c. 13 (N.I.)	15 December 2008
An Act to make provision relating to pensions; and for connected purposes.
