= List of acts of the Northern Ireland Assembly from 2007 =

This is a list of acts of the Northern Ireland Assembly passed in 2007. Acts of the Northern Ireland Assembly are enacted by the Northern Ireland Assembly, which has legislative authority over devolved matters in relation to Northern Ireland under the authority of the Northern Ireland Act 1998. Acts are cited by calendar year, in the same fashion as acts of Parliament of the United Kingdom. Each act passed in a respective year is given a chapter number (abbreviated "c.") denoted by Arabic numerals, and citations are usually followed by the suffix "(N.I.)" so as to prevent confusion with acts of Parliament of the United Kingdom.

3 acts of the Northern Ireland Assembly were passed in 2007.

indicates that an act has been transcribed on Wikisource, indicates that an act is available to view at legislation.gov.uk, and indicates the location of the original act in the Parliamentary Archives.

== Acts of the Northern Ireland Assembly ==
Short title	Citation	Royal assent
Long title
Budget Act (Northern Ireland) 2007 (repealed)	2007 c. 1 (N.I.)	29 June 2007
An Act to authorise the issue out of the Consolidated Fund of certain sums for the service of the year ending 31st March 2008; to appropriate those sums for specified purposes; to authorise the Department of Finance and Personnel to borrow on the credit of the appropriated sums; to authorise the use for the public service of certain resources (including accruing resources) for the year ending 31st March 2008; and to repeal certain spent provisions. (Repealed by Budget (No. 3) Act (Northern Ireland) 2010 (c. 11 (N.I.)))
Welfare Reform Act (Northern Ireland) 2007	2007 c. 2 (N.I.)	29 June 2007
An Act to make provision about social security and for connected purposes.
Children (Emergency Protection Orders) Act (Northern Ireland) 2007	2007 c. 3 (N.I.)	14 December 2007
An Act to repeal Article 64(8) of the Children (Northern Ireland) Order 1995. (Note: Children (Northern Ireland) Order 1995 (SI 1995/755))
