= List of committees of the Northern Ireland Assembly =

List of committees of the Northern Ireland Assembly is a list of departmental, standing and ad hoc committees of the Northern Ireland Assembly.

== Departmental committees ==
- Executive Office
- Agriculture, Environment and Rural Affairs
- Communities
- Economy
- Education
- Finance
- Health
- Infrastructure
- Justice

== Standing committees ==
- Windsor Framework Democratic Scrutiny Committee
- Assembly and Executive Review Committee
- Committee on Procedures
- Business Committee
- Public Accounts Committee
- Committee on Standards and Privileges
- Audit Committee

== See also ==
- List of government departments, their agencies and their ministers in Northern Ireland
