= List of acts of the Northern Ireland Assembly from 2020 =

This is a list of acts of the Northern Ireland Assembly passed in 2020. Acts of the Northern Ireland Assembly are enacted by the Northern Ireland Assembly, which has legislative authority over devolved matters in relation to Northern Ireland under the authority of the Northern Ireland Act 1998. Acts are cited by calendar year, in the same fashion as acts of Parliament of the United Kingdom. Each act passed in a respective year is given a chapter number (abbreviated "c.") denoted by Arabic numerals, and citations are usually followed by the suffix "(N.I.)" so as to prevent confusion with acts of Parliament of the United Kingdom.

6 acts of the Northern Ireland Assembly were passed in 2020.

indicates that an act has been transcribed on Wikisource, indicates that an act is available to view at legislation.gov.uk, and indicates the location of the original act in the Parliamentary Archives.

== Acts of the Northern Ireland Assembly ==
Short title	Citation	Royal assent
Long title
Budget Act (Northern Ireland) 2020	2020 c. 1 (N.I.)	26 March 2020
An Act to authorise the issue out of the Consolidated Fund of certain sums for the service of the years ending 31 March 2020 and 2021; to appropriate those sums for specified purposes; to authorise the use for the public service of certain resources for those years; to revise the limits on the use of certain accruing resources in the year ending 31 March 2020; and to authorise the Department of Finance to borrow on the credit of the sum appropriated for the year ending 31 March 2021.
Private Tenancies (Coronavirus Modifications) Act (Northern Ireland) 2020	2020 c. 2 (N.I.)	4 May 2020
An Act to Make emergency modifications in connection with coronavirus in relation to notices to quit to be given by landlords of private tenancies.
Budget (No. 2) Act (Northern Ireland) 2020	2020 c. 3 (N.I.)	17 June 2020
An Act to authorise the issue out of the Consolidated Fund of a certain sum for the service of the year ending 31 March 2021; to appropriate that sum for specified purposes; to authorise the Department of Finance to borrow on the credit of that sum; and to authorise the use for the public service of certain resources for that year.
Executive Committee (Functions) Act (Northern Ireland) 2020	2020 c. 4 (N.I.)	25 August 2020
An Act to make provision concerning the decisions which may be made by Ministers without recourse to the Executive Committee.
Housing (Amendment) Act (Northern Ireland) 2020	2020 c. 5 (N.I.)	28 August 2020
An Act to amend the law relating to housing associations; and for connected purposes.
Budget (No. 3) Act (Northern Ireland) 2020	2020 c. 6 (N.I.)	25 November 2020
An Act to authorise the issue out of the Consolidated Fund of a certain sum for the service of the year ending 31 March 2021; to appropriate that sum for specified purposes; to authorise the Department of Finance to borrow on the credit of that sum; to authorise the use for the public service of certain resources (including accruing resources) for the year ending 31 March 2021; to authorise the issue out of the Consolidated Fund of an excess cash sum for the service of the year ending 31 March 2017; to authorise the use for the public service of excess resources for that year; and to repeal certain spent provisions.
