= List of acts of the Northern Ireland Assembly from 2021 =

This is a list of acts of the Northern Ireland Assembly passed in 2021. Acts of the Northern Ireland Assembly are enacted by the Northern Ireland Assembly, which has legislative authority over devolved matters in relation to Northern Ireland under the authority of the Northern Ireland Act 1998. Acts are cited by calendar year, in the same fashion as acts of Parliament of the United Kingdom. Each act passed in a respective year is given a chapter number (abbreviated "c.") denoted by Arabic numerals, and citations are usually followed by the suffix "(N.I.)" so as to prevent confusion with acts of Parliament of the United Kingdom.

8 acts of the Northern Ireland Assembly were passed in 2021.

indicates that an act has been transcribed on Wikisource, indicates that an act is available to view at legislation.gov.uk, and indicates the location of the original act in the Parliamentary Archives.

== Acts of the Northern Ireland Assembly ==
Short title	Citation	Royal assent
Long title
Harbours (Grants and Loans Limit) Act (Northern Ireland) 2021	2021 c. 1 (N.I.)	1 March 2021
An Act to amend the Harbours Act (Northern Ireland) 1970 (Note: Harbours Act (Northern Ireland) 1970 (c. 1 (N.I.))) to increase the statutory limit on certain grants and loans for harbour works etc.
Domestic Abuse and Civil Proceedings Act (Northern Ireland) 2021	2021 c. 2 (N.I.)	1 March 2021
An Act to create a course of conduct offence and a sentencing aggravation concerning domestic abuse and make rules as to procedure and giving evidence in criminal cases involving domestic abuse; regulate the conduct of civil proceedings in particular circumstances; and make provision for connected purposes.
Functioning of Government (Miscellaneous Provisions) Act (Northern Ireland) 2021	2021 c. 3 (N.I.)	22 March 2021
An Act to amend sections 7 and 8 of the Civil Service (Special Advisers) Act (Northern Ireland) 2013, (Note: Civil Service (Special Advisers) Act (Northern Ireland) 2013 (c. 8 (N.I.))) repeal the Civil Service Commissioners (Amendment) (Northern Ireland) Order in Council 2007, (Note: Civil Service Commissioners (Amendment) (Northern Ireland) Order in Council 2007) repeal the Civil Service Commissioners (Amendment) Order (Northern Ireland) 2016, (Note: Civil Service Commissioners (Amendment) Order (Northern Ireland) 2016) amend sections 17 and 27 of the Assembly Members (Independent Financial Review and Standards) Act (Northern Ireland) 2011 (Note: Assembly Members (Independent Financial Review and Standards) Act (Northern Ireland) 2011 (c. 17 (N.I.))) and to make additional provision for the functioning of government in Northern Ireland and connected purposes.
Budget Act (Northern Ireland) 2021	2021 c. 4 (N.I.)	23 March 2021
An Act to authorise the issue out of the Consolidated Fund of certain sums for the service of the years ending 31 March 2021 and 2022; to appropriate those sums for specified purposes; to authorise the use for the public service of certain resources for those years; to revise the limits on the use of certain accruing resources in the year ending 31 March 2021; and to authorise the Department of Finance to borrow on the credit of the sum appropriated for the year ending 31 March 2022.
Budget (No. 2) Act (Northern Ireland) 2021	2021 c. 5 (N.I.)	4 August 2021
An Act to authorise the issue out of the Consolidated Fund of a certain sum for the service of the year ending 31 March 2022; to appropriate that sum for specified purposes; to authorise the Department of Finance to borrow on the credit of that sum; to authorise the use for the public service of certain resources (including accruing resources) for that year; and to repeal certain spent provisions.
Pension Schemes Act (Northern Ireland) 2021	2021 c. 6 (N.I.)	9 August 2021
An Act to make provision about pension schemes.
Licensing and Registration of Clubs (Amendment) Act (Northern Ireland) 2021	2021 c. 7 (N.I.)	26 August 2021
An Act to make provision about liquor licensing and the registration of clubs.
Local Government (Meetings and Performance) Act (Northern Ireland) 2021	2021 c. 8 (N.I.)	26 August 2021
An Act to make provision relating to requirements as to meetings and performance of district councils.
