= Act of the Northern Ireland Assembly =

Acts passed by the devolved Northern Ireland Assembly

An act of the Northern Ireland Assembly is primary legislation made by the Northern Ireland Assembly. The power to create acts was conferred to the Parliament by section 5 of the Northern Ireland Act 1998 following the successful 1998 referendum on the Good Friday Agreement.

Prior to the establishment of the Parliament under the 1998 act, all post-union laws specific to Northern Ireland were passed at the Westminster Parliament. Although the Westminster Parliament has retained the ability to legislate for Northern Ireland, by convention it does not do so without the consent of the Northern Ireland Assembly.

A draft act is known as a bill. Once it is passed by the Northern Ireland and receives royal assent, the bill becomes an act and is then a part of Northern Ireland Law.

== Classification of legislation ==
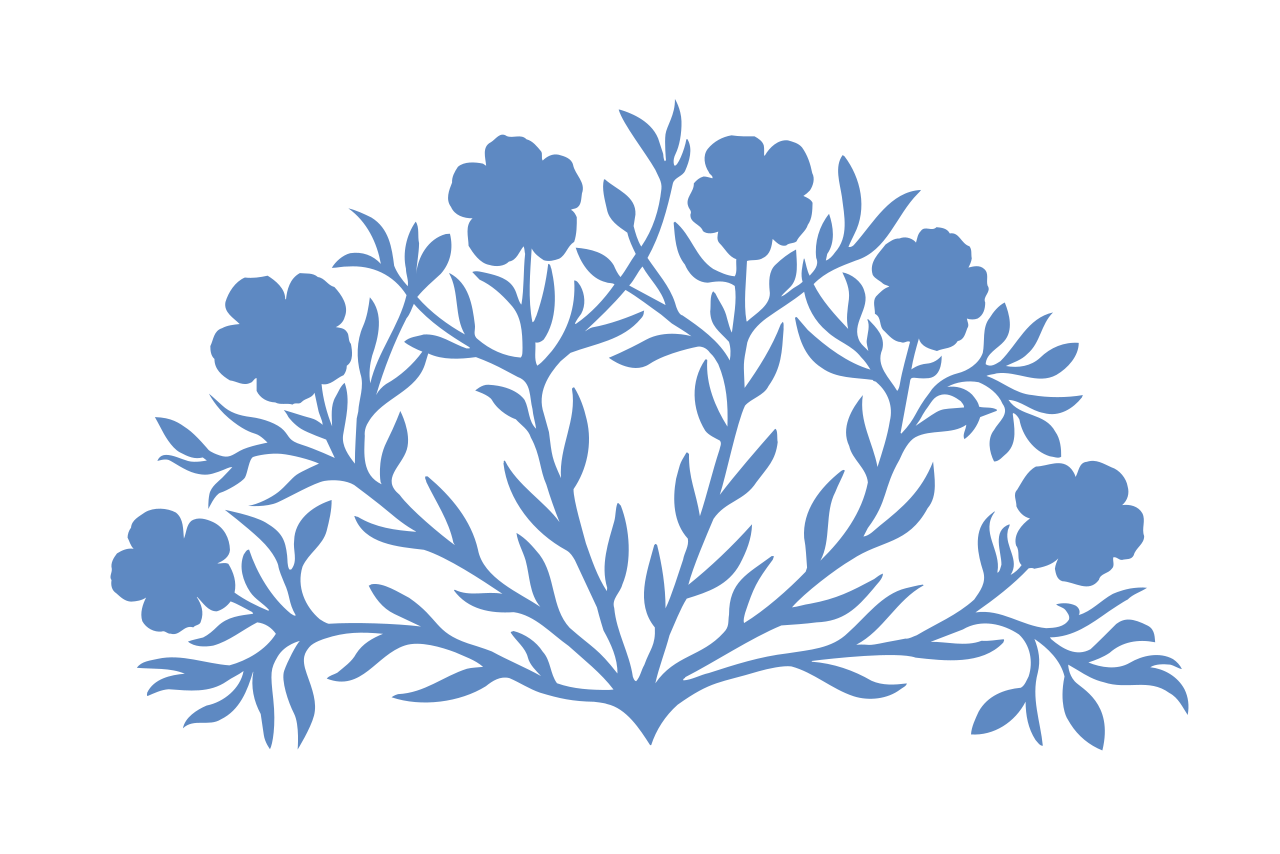
The logo of the Northern Ireland Assembly.

=== Public bills ===
A public bill is a bill which is introduced by a Member of the Legislative Assembly (Northern Ireland) (MLA), and which will deal with the general laws of Northern Ireland, rather than the law as it applies to a single person or organisation. Public bills are further divided into categories based on the MSP who proposed them: executive bills for a member of the Northern Ireland Executive; committee bills for the chair of one of the committee of the Northern Ireland Assembly; or private members' bills for any MLA who is not a member of the Northern Ireland Executive.

=== Private bills ===
A 'private bill means a bill "introduced for the purpose of obtaining for the Promoter particular powers or benefits in excess of or in conflict with the general law, and includes a Bill relating to the estate, property, status or style, or otherwise relating to the personal affairs, of the Promoter".

The Northern Ireland Assembly has considered other implementations of private legislation procedures.

== Stages of bills ==
There are a number of stages a bill must pass through before it becomes an act, but to pass through these stages it must first be introduced to the Assembly.

=== Internal to Parliament ===
Following a bill's introduction to Parliament, the first three stages a bill passes through are broadly defined by section 13 of the Northern Ireland Act 1998. The precise process is set out by the Parliament's standing orders, and varies slightly depending on how the bill is classified.

==== General debate ====
The first stage after introduction is a debate of the bill's intentions and its general principles, referred to in the standing orders as Stage 1 and required by section 36(1)(a) of the 1998 act. The bill is referred to the relevant parliamentary committee or committees, plus the Delegated Powers and Law Reform committee (DPLR) if the bill allows the creation of secondary legislation known as Statutory rules of Northern Ireland. One of the relevant committees is designated the lead committee, and that committee prepares a report on the bill's general principles. The DPLR, if it is involved, will also prepare a report on the necessity of conferring the power to create secondary legislation.

Once prepared, the reports are presented to Parliament for consideration. The Assembly may move to have a further report produced by the lead committee (either on the bill as a whole or on a specific part), or proceed to debate. A debate considers the committee reports, and is concluded by the MLA in charge of the bill moving "that the Assembly agrees to the general principles of the bill." If that motion receives the support of the Parliament, the bill proceeds to Stage 2. If the motion fails, the bill fails and does not proceed.

==== Committee consideration ====
Once the Parliament agrees to the general principles of a bill, the bill progresses to Stage 2. In this stage, the bill may be referred back to the lead committee designated in Stage 1, or may be transferred to one or more other committees. Occasionally, a bill is transferred to a committee of the entire Northern Ireland Assembly. The committees the bill is referred to then cover the bill in detail, and must agree on each individual portion (in contrast to Stage 1, where only the general idea of the bill must be agreed on). Specifically, the committees must agree on individual sections of the bill, schedules to the bill, and the bill's long title, and must do so in that order unless the committees or Parliament decide otherwise.

In this stage, a bill can be amended, and any submitted amendments to a portion of the bill must be considered before a committee can agree on that portion. MSPs not on any Stage 2 committees can participate in discussion and submit amendments, but can't vote on whether amendments are accepted or rejected. Depending on the amendments submitted, it may be required to update the bill's supporting documents. The Stage 2 committees, unlike the Stage 1 committees, do not produce a report on the bill.

Stage 2 partially fulfils the requirements of section 13(1)(b) of the 1998 act, along with Stage 3.

==== Parliament consideration ====
Following committee consideration, the bill is presented "as amended" to a meeting of the entire Northern Ireland Assembly, where it is again debated and can again be amended. This is Stage 3, and fulfils the requirements of sections 13(1)(b) and 13(1)(c) of the 1998 act. Unlike in Stage 2, the Parliament will only debate those amendments selected by the Speaker of the Northern Ireland Assembly. Amendments are considered in order of the portions of the bill they amend, unless Parliament agrees to consider them in a different order.

Following the debate and consideration of the bill and any Stage 3 amendments, the Parliament may opt to send the bill back to Stage 2 for further consideration. However, if it is felt that adequate consideration has already been had, the Parliament will vote on whether to pass the bill. If the bill does not receive a majority in-favour votes, or if the vote is invalid, the bill fails and does not proceed. The vote is considered invalid when an electronic vote is taken and fewer than a quarter of (129 total) MSPs vote.

If Crown Consent is required and was not gained before Stage 3, it will usually be gained before the start of the vote on whether to pass the bill.

=== External to Parliament ===
Once passed by Parliament, the stages a bill passes through before becoming an act are set out by sections 5, 6, 7 of the Northern Ireland Act 1998. These stages generally do not involve the Assembly.

==== Statutory challenge ====
A passed bill may be challenged by the Advocate General for Northern Ireland, the Attorney General for Northern Ireland, or the Attorney General, who can refer it under section 33 of the 1998 act to the Supreme Court of the United Kingdom for review. The Supreme Court will then determine whether the bill is within the Assembly's legislative competence; before the UK left the European Union in 2020, it could also decide whether the bill was to be referred to the European Court of Justice (ECJ) for review. Such a challenge may be lodged within the four weeks following the passing or approval of the bill. If a bill was referred to the ECJ, the Parliament could move to reconsider the bill and have the reference withdrawn. If the reference is only to the Supreme Court, the Parliament must wait for the Court's decision. This type of statutory challenge is termed a Section 12 reference.

The Secretary of State may also challenge by order under section 35 of the 1998 act. Section 35 provides that such challenges must be on the grounds that the bill: is incompatible with international obligations; is incompatible with the interests of defence or national security; or deals with reserved matters and will have "an adverse effect on the operation of the law." These orders can be created within the four weeks following the passing or approval of the bill, or within four weeks following the lodging of a section 33 reference against the bill. The orders can remain active indefinitely, and are referred to as Section 14 orders.

==== Royal assent ====
The final stage before a bill can be classed as an act is the receiving of royal assent – the approval of the monarch. Although the actual process of royal assent is a formality – royal assent has not been refused for 318 years – sections 5, 14 and 15 of the 1998 act mean that a bill cannot become an act without royal assent. A bill is submitted for royal assent by the Speaker, who may only do so after either waiting for the four-week statutory challenge period to expire or after receiving confirmation that no statutory challenge will be lodged as per section 11 of the Northern Ireland Act 1998.

A bill receives royal assent through Letters patent under the Great Seal of Northern Ireland, through section 49 of the Northern Ireland Act 1998. The Letters Patent are of the form:

Letters patent

CHARLES THE THIRD by the Grace of God of the United Kingdom of Great Britain and Northern Ireland and of Our other Realms and Territories King Head of the Commonwealth Defender of the Faith To the Members of the Northern Ireland Assembly.

AND WHERAS pursuant to the Northern Ireland Act 1998 the said Bill has been submitted to Us by '[insert name of Secretary of State]' one of our Principal Secretaries for our Royal Assent

We have therefore caused these Our Letters Patent to be made and have signed them and by them We give Our Royal Asset to the said Bill COMMANDING '[insert name of Clerk of the Crown for Northern Ireland]' the Clerk of the Northern Ireland to seal these Our Letters with the Great Seal of Northern Ireland AND ALSO COMMANDING that these Our Letters be notified the Presiding Officer of the Northern Ireland Assembly;

AND FINALLY WE declare that in accordance with the Northern Ireland Act 1998, at the beginning of the day on which Our Royal Assent on which Our Royal Assent has been notified as aforesaid the said Bill shall become an Act of the Northern Ireland Assembly

In Witness whereof We have caused these Our Letters to be made Patent

WITNESS Ourself at [...] the [...] day of [...] in the [...] year of Our Reign.

By The King Himself Signed with His Own Hand.

Once the Letters Patent are received and sealed, the bill becomes an act of the Northern Ireland Assembly. However, parts of or even the entire act may not immediately have effect. An extreme example of this is the Easter Act 1928, an act of the United Kingdom Parliament which has never been put into effect.

==== Coming into force ====
A bill, after becoming an act, does not necessarily have legal force immediately. Most acts wholly or partially come into force the day after royal assent; many include provisions that must be brought into force by a commencement order (a statutory instrument). One example is the Period Products (Free Provision) Act (Northern Ireland) 2022, which includes provisions for both:

Commencement

10.—(1) The following provisions of this Act come into operation on the day after Royal Assent—

(a)section 2(1), (2) and (7) to (16);

(b)section 8;

(c)section 9;

(d)this section; and

(e)section 11.

(2) The other provisions of this Act come into operation—

(a)at the end of the period of two years beginning with the day of Royal Assent, or

(b)on such earlier day or days as the Executive Office may by order appoint instead.

(3) An order under this section may include such transitional, transitory or saving provision as the Executive Office considers appropriate.

As of July 2016, two commencement orders have brought sections 84 and 112 of that act, respectively, into force. Section 84 was brought into force on 10 March 2016, and section 112 on 1 July 2016.

== Style of an act ==
=== Numbering ===
The numbering of acts of the Northern Ireland closely resembles that of acts of other devolved legislatures in the UK, and of acts of the UK Parliament. An act's number consists of the calendar year in which the act received royal assent, followed by the abbreviation "c." (chapter), followed by a number which increases consecutively from one with each act in the calendar year. Thus, the first act of 2016 is numbered 2002 c. 1, the second is 2002 c. , and so on. The first act of 2003 is 2003 c. 1 because the final number resets each calendar year.

If multiple acts receive royal assent on the same day, they are numbered based on the order in which their Letters Patent are received. If multiple acts are specified in a single Letters Patent, the acts are numbered by the order in which they are mentioned in the Letters.

=== Citation ===
An act can be cited in a number of ways: by reference to its short title ("Defamation Act (Northern Ireland) 2022"); by reference to its full number ("2022 c. 30"); or both ("Defamation Act (Northern Ireland) 2022 (2022 c. 30)"), although the exact appearance of this type of citation generally depends on the style guide in use.

=== Enactment formula ===
The enactment formula for acts of the Northern Ireland Assembly is typical – it does begin with a variation of the phrase "be it enacted..." and refers to the monarch:

BE IT ENACTED by being passed by the Northern Ireland Assembly and assented to by Her Majesty as follows:

— Period Products (Free Provision) Act (Northern Ireland) 2022

The enactment formula is then immediately followed by the act's long title, and then the contents of the act.

=== Divisions ===
A division of a bill or act is a component, generally numbered, dealing with increasingly discrete topics, equivalent to the chapters of a book. For example, the highest-level division might be "trees," with two subdivisions for evergreen and deciduous trees, with each of those having subdivisions for particular species of trees. Different divisions are used depending on the role of that division (e.g. parts versus schedules).

A table of divisions is shown. In this table "Continuous?" indicates whether the numbering of those divisions continues across divisions, or whether the numbering resets to the first value in the sequence at the start of the next-highest-level division. The "Optional?" column indicates whether, within that portion of the act, that division can be omitted. While addenda are themselves optional, an addendum to an act must use the paragraph division.

==== Body of the act ====
The main body matter of an act is divided into parts, then chapters, then sections, then subsections, then paragraphs, then sub- and sub-sub-paragraphs (or "heads"). The only division that must be used is the section; all others are optional, although chapters cannot be used without parts. These divisions are almost always numbered, although paragraphs may occasionally not be numbered, such as when being used for a list of definitions.

==== Addenda to the act ====
Some acts have schedules, a type of addendum, which give additional information. Schedules are commonly used to provide lists of amendments to other acts, but may be used anywhere it may not be appropriate to include the information in the act's main text. For example, section 6 of the Charities Act (Northern Ireland) 2008 gives a general definition of the Charity Commission for Northern Ireland, while schedule 1 to that act gives more detail; and schedule 1 to the Budget Act (Northern Ireland) 2024 sets out the purposes for which money will be allocated to the Northern Ireland Executive, and how much money will be allocated to those purposes.

If there are multiple schedules, each is individually numbered; otherwise a schedule is not numbered. Schedules are then divided into parts, then chapters, then paragraphs, and then sub-paragraphs in the same way as the sections of the main body of the act. As with the main body, parts and chapters are optional, and chapters cannot be used without parts. Although schedules still have the full force of law like sections, they are counted as additions rather than main components of the act, and so a schedule is said to be "to an act" rather than "of an act."

==== Other ====
Both the main body of the act and its addenda may have cross-headings. These are non-numbered divisions that don't affect the numbering of other divisions, and serve to make reading the document easier. For example, Part 2 Chapter 6 ("The Charity Commission for Northern Ireland") of the Charities Act mentioned above has cross-headings dividing it into portions related to the register itself, applying for entry to the register, acceptable names for charities on the register, and so on. Cross-headings are shown in italic type.

== See also ==
- Act of Parliament
- Statutory rules of Northern Ireland
- Northern Ireland Assembly
- List of acts of the Northern Ireland Assembly
