= List of statutory rules and orders of Northern Ireland, 1944 =

This is an incomplete list of statutory rules and orders of Northern Ireland during 1944. Statutory rules and orders were the predecessor of statutory rules and they formed the secondary legislation of Northern Ireland between 1922 and 1973.

Number	Title
No. 1	
No. 2	The Rate of Payment to Ministry of Commerce Order (Northern Ireland) 1944
No. 3	The Scutch Mills and Flax (Fire Insurance) (Amendment) Regulations (Northern Ireland) 1944
No. 4	The Railways (Annual Accounts and Returns) Order (Northern Ireland) 1944
No. 5	
No. 6	The Technical Teachers Amending No. 4 Regulations (Northern Ireland) 1944
No. 7 & 8	
No. 9	The Secondary Teachers Amending No. 6 Regulations (Northern Ireland) 1944
No. 10	The Technical Teachers Amending No. 5 Regulations (Northern Ireland) 1944
No. 11	The Poisons Order (Northern Ireland) 1944
No. 12	The Public Elementary Schools Amending No. 17 Regulations (Northern Ireland) 1944
No. 13 - 15	
No. 16	The Food (Feeding Stuffs) (Oat By-Products) Order (Northern Ireland) 1944
No. 17	The Coal Supply (Temporary Provisions) Order (Northern Ireland) 1944
No. 18	
No. 19	The Royal Ulster Constabulary (Women Members) Pay Order (Northern Ireland) 1944
No. 20	The County Court Costs - Direction amending the Scales (Northern Ireland) 1944
No. 21	
No. 22	The Motor Car (Speed) Regulations (Northern Ireland) 1944
No. 23	The Binder Twine Control Order (Northern Ireland) 1944
No. 24 & 25	
No. 26	The Pig Industry Council (Term and Condition of Office of Members) (Amendment) Rules (Northern Ireland) 1944
No. 27	The Pig Industry Council (Election of Members) Regulations (Northern Ireland) 1944
No. 28 - 30	
No. 31	The Royal Ulster Constabulary Pay (Amending) Order (Northern Ireland) 1944
No. 32	The Lifting of Potatoes (Prohibition) Order (Northern Ireland) 1944
No. 33	The National Fire Service (General) Regulations (Northern Ireland) 1944
No. 34	The Explosive Substance (Conveyance) Order (Northern Ireland) 1944
No. 35	The National Health Insurance (Dental Benefit) Amendment Regulations (Northern Ireland) 1944
No. 36	
No. 37	The Marketing of Fruit (Amendment) Rules (Northern Ireland) 1944
No. 38	The Waste of Fuel (Amendment) Order (Northern Ireland) 1944
No. 39	The Factories (Notification of Diseases) Regulations (Northern Ireland) 1944
No. 40 & 41	
No. 42	The Ministries (Appointed Day) Order in Council (Northern Ireland) 1944
No. 43	The Ministries (Transfer of Functions) (No. 1) Order (Northern Ireland) 1944
No. 44	The Lifting of Potatoes (Prohibition) (No. 2) Order (Northern Ireland) 1944
No. 45	The Coal Supply (Temporary Provisions) Amendment (No. 3) Order (Northern Ireland) 1944
No. 46	The Teachers' (Public Elementary) Superannuation (Amendment) Scheme (Northern Ireland) 1944
No. 47	The Housing (Requisitioning of Premises) (General) Regulations (Northern Ireland) 1944
No. 48	The Secondary Teachers Amending No. 7 Regulations (Northern Ireland) 1944
No. 49	The Contributory Pensions (Exempt and Excepted Persons) Amendment Regulations (Northern Ireland) 1944
No. 50	The Variation of Orders, Byelaws, etc. Order (Northern Ireland) 1944
No. 51	The Ryegrass (Control of Harvesting) Order (Northern Ireland) 1944
No. 52 - 54	
No. 55	The Control of Fertilisers Order (Northern Ireland) 1944
No. 56	The Exercise of Powers: Appropriate Department Order (Northern Ireland) 1944
No. 57	The Intoxicating Liquor (Compensation Charges) Order (Northern Ireland) 1944
No. 58	The Planning (General Interim Development) Order (Northern Ireland) 1944
No. 59	The Motor Vehicle Licences: Harvesting Operations Concession Order (Northern Ireland) 1944
No. 60	
No. 61	The Ministries (Transfer of Functions) (No. 2) Order (Northern Ireland) 1944
No. 62	The Teachers' (Secondary and Preparatory) Superannuation (Amendment) Scheme (Northern Ireland) 1944
No. 63	The Teachers' (Agricultural and Technical) Superannuation (Amendment) Scheme (Northern Ireland) 1944
No. 64	The Trade Boards (Notices) Regulations (Northern Ireland) 1944
No. 65	
No. 66	The Solicitors - Increase in Remuneration Order (Northern Ireland) 1944
No. 67	The Parliamentary Grant (Education Authorities) Regulations (Northern Ireland) 1944
No. 68	The Coal Supply (Temporary Provisions) No. 2 Order (Northern Ireland) 1944
No. 69	The Tillage General Order (Northern Ireland) 1944
No. 70	The Marketing of Fruit (Consolidation) Rules (Northern Ireland) 1944
No. 71	
No. 72	The Increase of Pensions (Calculation of Income) Regulations (Northern Ireland) 1944
No. 73	The Increase of Pensions (General) Regulations (Northern Ireland) 1944
No. 74	The Housing Schemes Regulations (Northern Ireland) 1944
No. 75	The Sheep Dipping (Special Regulation) Order (Northern Ireland) 1944
No. 76	The Prisons (Particular Localities) Order (Northern Ireland) 1944
No. 77	The Fire Watchers (Revocation) Order (Northern Ireland) 1944
No. 78	The Scutch Mills and Flax (Fire Insurance) (Amendment) (No. 2) Regulations (Northern Ireland) 1944
No. 79	
No. 80	The Grass Seeds and Fertilisers General Order (Northern Ireland) 1944
No. 81	The Reinstatement in Civil Employment (Exemption from Restriction) Order (Northern Ireland) 1944
No. 82	The Public Security (Securing of Horses) (Revocation) Order (Northern Ireland) 1944
No. 83	The Unemployment Insurance (Emergency Powers) (Mercantile Marine Exclusion) Regulations (Northern Ireland) 1944
No. 84	The National Fire Service (General) (No. 2) Regulations (Northern Ireland) 1944
No. 85	The Malone Training School Regulations (Northern Ireland) 1944
No. 86	The Non-Contributory Old Age Pensions (Residence in the Isle of Man) Order (Northern Ireland) 1944
No. 87	The Secondary School Examinations (Amending) No. 5 Regulations (Northern Ireland) 1944
No. 88	The Technical Teachers Amending No. 6 Regulations (Northern Ireland) 1944
No. 89	The Secondary Teachers Amending No. 8 Regulations (Northern Ireland) 1944
No. 90	The Public Elementary Schools Amending No. 18 Regulations (Northern Ireland) 1944
No. 91	The Teachers' (Public Elementary) Superannuation (Amendment) (No. 2) Scheme (Northern Ireland) 1944
No. 92	The Teachers' (Secondary and Preparatory) Superannuation (Amendment) (No. 2) Scheme (Northern Ireland) 1944
No. 93	The Teachers' (Agricultural and Technical) Superannuation (Amendment) No. 2 Scheme (Northern Ireland) 1944
No. 94	The Bacon Industry (Pig Nutrition Research Grant) Order (Northern Ireland) 1944
No. 95	The Furniture (Control of Manufacture and Supply) Order (Northern Ireland) 1944
No. 96	The Utility Furniture (Supply and Acquisition) Order (Northern Ireland) 1944
No. 97	The Domestic Furniture (Utility Mark) Directions (Northern Ireland) 1944
No. 98	The National Health Insurance (Subsidiary Employments) Amendment Order (Northern Ireland) 1944
No. 99	The Unemployment Insurance (Subsidiary Employments) Amendment Regulations (Northern Ireland) 1944
No. 100	The Corn, Feeding Stuff, Oat Products and Ryegrass Seed (Records and Returns) Order (Northern Ireland) 1944
No. 101	The Local Government (Finance) Regulations (Northern Ireland) 1944
No. 102	The Exported Animals (Compensation) (Suspension of Charges) Order (Northern Ireland) 1944
No. 103	The Unemployment Insurance (Appointed Day) Order (Northern Ireland) 1944
No. 104	
No. 105	The Civil Defence (Reference to Official Arbitrator) Rules (Northern Ireland) 1944
No. 106	The Civil Defence (Reference to Official Arbitrator) Fees Rules (Northern Ireland) 1944
No. 107	
No. 108	The Public Elementary Schools Amending No. 19 Regulations (Northern Ireland) 1944
No. 109	The Public Elementary Schools (Teachers' War Service) Amending No. 4 Regulations (Northern Ireland) 1944
No. 110	The Coke Supply Order (Northern Ireland) 1944
No. 111	The Ministries (Transfer of Functions) (No. 3) Order (Northern Ireland) 1944
No. 112 & 113	
No. 114	The Motor Car (Use and Construction) (Amendment) Regulations (Northern Ireland) 1944

== See also ==
- List of statutory rules of Northern Ireland
