= List of UK political slogans =

In the United Kingdom, political slogans and memorable phrases are used during election campaigns to put across messages and rally support. Slogans used by political parties often centre around current issues of the day or policies they wish to address.

== Referendums relating to the EEC and EU ==
=== 1975 EEC membership referendum ===
In the 1975 European Communities membership referendum, campaigners rallied behind "Yes" and "No" messages, with the official yes campaign Britain in Europe using slogans such as Vote YES, Keep Britain in Europe, Vote Yes to Keep the Peace (in reference to the Second World War), Support Your Local Continent and We Believe in Britain – in Britain in Europe. The National Referendum Campaign, which was the official no campaign, used slogans such as Let's Get Britain Out of the Common Market, For Our Right To Rule Ourselves Vote No and To Keep Food Prices Down Vote No. A third campaign calling for a "Don't Know" option on the ballot, the Don't Know Campaign, used the slogan Pass the Buck Back to Westminster – Where it Belongs.

Political parties also rallied behind their own slogans. The Labour Party under Harold Wilson officially adopted a neutral line on EEC membership, declaring that the referendum would decide Britain's New Deal in Europe. The pro-EEC Labour Campaign for Britain in Europe adopted Europe YES as their slogan. The Conservatives under Margaret Thatcher officially supported membership, using the slogan YES to Europe. The cross-party Anti-Common Market League led by Conservative and Labour politicians used slogans such as Out of Europe and Into the World.

Yes
Conservative Party	YES to Europe
Britain in Europe	Vote YES Keep Britain in Europe; Vote Yes to Keep the Peace; Support Your Local Continent; We Believe in Britain – in Britain in Europe
Labour Campaign for Britain in Europe	Europe YES

Neutral
Labour Party	Britain's New Deal in Europe
Don't Know Campaign	Pass the Buck Back to Westminster – Where it Belongs

No
National Referendum Campaign	Let's Get Britain Out of the Common Market; For Our Right To Rule Ourselves Vote No; To Keep Food Prices Down Vote No
Anti-Common Market League	Out of Europe and Into the World

=== 2016 EU membership referendum ===
In 2016, the United Kingdom's referendum on membership of the European Union saw political parties align into two camps; Leave and Remain. Messages on the Leave side focused on themes such as regaining sovereignty and the benefits of leaving the EU, while those on the Remain side argued for the benefits of staying and the dangers of leaving.

Leave
Vote Leave	Let's Take Back Control
UKIP	We Want Our Country Back; Believe in Britain

Remain
Britain Stronger in Europe	Stronger, Safer and Better Off
Green Party of England and Wales	Yes to Europe
Labour Party	Labour In for Britain
Liberal Democrats	Liberal Democrats #INtogether

== General elections ==
=== 1979 general election ===
	Party	Slogans	Ref.
National	Conservative Party	Labour Isn't Working; Don't just hope for a better life, vote for one	
National	Ecology Party	The Real Alternative	
National	Labour Party	The Labour Way is the Better Way	
National	Liberal Party	The Real Fight is for Britain	
National	National Front	It's Our Country - Let's Win It Back!	
Northern Ireland	Social Democratic and Labour Party	Strengthen Your Voice	

=== 1983 general election ===
	Party	Slogans	Ref.
National	British National Party	Vote for Britain	
National	Conservative Party	The Challenge of Our Times	
National	Ecology Party	Politics for Life	
National	Labour Party	The New Hope for Britain	
National	SDP–Liberal Alliance	Working together for Britain	

=== 1987 general election ===
	Party	Slogans	Ref.
National	Conservative Party	The Next Moves Forward	
National	Labour Party	Britain will win with Labour	
National	SDP–Liberal Alliance	Britain United: The Time Has Come	

=== 1992 general election ===
	Party	Slogans	Ref.
National	British National Party	Fight Back!	
National	Conservative Party	The Best Future for Britain	
National	Green Party of England and Wales	New Directions	
National	Labour Party	It's time to get Britain working again	
National	Liberal Democrats	Changing Britain for good	
Scotland	Scottish National Party	Vote for Scotland; Independence in Europe Make it Happen Now!	
Northern Ireland	Social Democratic and Labour Party	A New North A New Ireland A New Europe	

=== 1997 general election ===
	Party	Slogans	Ref.
National	British National Party	Britain Reborn	
National	Conservative Party	New Labour, New Danger You Can Only Be Sure With The Conservatives	
National	Green Party of England and Wales	A Real Political Choice	
National	Labour Party	Britain Deserves Better; New Labour, New Life for Britain	
National	Liberal Democrats	Make the Difference	
National	UK Independence Party	A Real Alternative	
Scotland	Scottish Green Party	A Green vision of Scotland	
Scotland	Scottish National Party	Yes We Can	
Wales	Plaid Cymru	The Best for Wales	
Northern Ireland	Alliance Party of Northern Ireland		
Northern Ireland	Democratic Unionist Party	Democracy – Not Dublin Rule	
Northern Ireland	Green Party in Northern Ireland		
Northern Ireland	People Before Profit Alliance		
Northern Ireland	Sinn Féin	A New Opportunity for Peace; Building a dynamic for change	
Northern Ireland	Social Democratic and Labour Party	Real Leadership Real Peace	
Northern Ireland	Ulster Unionist Party	Secure your Union Build your future	

=== 2001 general election ===
	Party	Slogans	Ref.
National	British National Party	Where We Stand!	
National	Conservative Party	Time for common sense	
National	Green Party of England and Wales	Reach for the future	
National	Labour Party	Ambitions for Britain	
National	Liberal Democrats	Freedom Justice Honesty	
National	UK Independence Party	Ditch Europe	
Scotland	Scottish Green Party		
Scotland	Scottish National Party	We stand for Scotland	
Wales	Plaid Cymru		
Northern Ireland	Democratic Unionist Party	Leadership to Put Things Right!	
Northern Ireland	Sinn Féin	Sinn Féin Delivering Real Change; Building an Ireland of Equals	
Northern Ireland	Social Democratic and Labour Party	It's Working – Let's Keep Building	
Northern Ireland	Ulster Unionist Party	Don't turn back the clock; Don't let them wreck it; The Union secured, building your future	

=== 2005 general election ===
	Party	Slogans	Ref.
National	British National Party	Rebuilding British Democracy	
National	Conservative Party	Vote for Change; It's time for action.	
National	Green Party of England and Wales	The Real Choice for Real Change	
National	Labour Party	Forward, not back	
National	Liberal Democrats	The Real Alternative	
National	Respect Party	Peace Justice Equality	
National	UK Independence Party	We Want Our Country Back	
Scotland	Scottish Greens	People, Planet, Peace	
Scotland	Scottish National Party	Let's Make Scotland Matter	
Wales	Plaid Cymru	We can build a better Wales	
Northern Ireland	Alliance Party of Northern Ireland	Alliance Works	
Northern Ireland	Democratic Unionist Party	Leadership That's Working	
Northern Ireland	Green Party in Northern Ireland		
Northern Ireland	People Before Profit Alliance		
Northern Ireland	Sinn Féin		
Northern Ireland	Social Democratic and Labour Party	A Better Way to a Better Ireland	
Northern Ireland	Ulster Unionist Party	Simply British	

=== 2010 general election ===
	Party	Slogans	Ref.
National	British National Party	Democracy, Freedom, Culture, and Identity	
National	Conservative Party	Vote for change	
National	Green Party of England and Wales	Fair is Worth Fighting For	
National	Labour Party	A future fair for all	
National	Liberal Democrats	Change that works for you	
National	UK Independence Party	Empowering the People	
Scotland	Scottish Green Party	A Living Wage for All Protect Public Services Support New Green Jobs	
Scotland	Scottish National Party	Elect a local champion	
Wales	Plaid Cymru	Think Different. Think Plaid.	
Northern Ireland	Alliance Party of Northern Ireland	Alliance Works	
Northern Ireland	Democratic Unionist Party	Let's Keep Northern Ireland Moving Forward	
Northern Ireland	Green Party in Northern Ireland	Make a Difference; A Green New Deal	
Northern Ireland	People Before Profit Alliance		
Northern Ireland	Sinn Féin	Peace Equality Jobs Unity	
Northern Ireland	Social Democratic and Labour Party	For Your Future	
Northern Ireland	Traditional Unionist Voice	Putting it Right!; You Know Where You Stand With The TUV	
Northern Ireland	Ulster Unionist Party	We're All In This Together	

=== 2015 general election ===
	Party	Slogans	Ref.
National	Conservative Party	Strong Leadership, A Clear Economic Plan And A Brighter, More Secure Future	
National	Green Party of England and Wales	For the Common Good	
National	Labour Party	Britain can be better; A better plan, a better future	
National	Liberal Democrats	Stronger Economy. Fairer Society. Opportunity for Everyone.	
National	UK Independence Party	Believe in Britain	
Scotland	Scottish Green Party	An Economy for the People, a Society for All	
Scotland	Scottish National Party	Stronger for Scotland	
Wales	Plaid Cymru	Working for Wales	
Northern Ireland	Alliance Party of Northern Ireland	Working for You at Westminster	
Northern Ireland	Democratic Unionist Party	Standing Up for Northern Ireland; Step Not Back	
Northern Ireland	Green Party in Northern Ireland	For the Common Good	
Northern Ireland	People Before Profit Alliance		
Northern Ireland	Sinn Féin	Equality Not Austerity	
Northern Ireland	Social Democratic and Labour Party	Prosperity not Austerity	
Northern Ireland	Traditional Unionist Voice	The Real ALTERNATIVE; Enough is Enough	
Northern Ireland	Ulster Unionist Party	One Day One Vote One Chance for Change	

=== 2017 general election ===
	Party	Slogan	Ref.
National	Conservative Party	Forward, Together; Strong and Stable	
National	Green Party of England and Wales	The Green Party for a Confident and Caring Britain; The Green Guarantee	
National	Labour Party	For the Many, not the Few	
National	Liberal Democrats	Change Britain's Future	
National	UK Independence Party	Britain Together	
Scotland	Scottish Green Party	Our Future is Green	
Scotland	Scottish National Party	Stronger for Scotland	
Wales	Plaid Cymru	Defending Wales	
Northern Ireland	Alliance Party of Northern Ireland	Change Direction	
Northern Ireland	Democratic Unionist Party	Standing Strong For Northern Ireland	
Northern Ireland	Green Party in Northern Ireland	#PuttingYouFirst	
Northern Ireland	People Before Profit Alliance	People Before Profit	
Northern Ireland	Sinn Féin	Standing up for Equality, Rights, Irish Unity	
Northern Ireland	Social Democratic and Labour Party	Taking Our Seats Taking a Stand	
Northern Ireland	Traditional Unionist Voice	Drain the Swamp	
Northern Ireland	Ulster Unionist Party	For A Stronger, Better Union	

=== 2019 general election ===
	Party	Slogan	Ref.
National	Conservative Party	Get Brexit Done.; Unleash Britain's Potential.; Britain Deserves Better	
National	Green Party of England and Wales	If Not Now, When?	
National	Labour Party	It's Time for Real Change Rebuilding Britain For The Many Not The Few	
National	Liberal Democrats	Stop Brexit. Build a Brighter Future	
National	The Brexit Party	Change Politics for Good	
National	UK Independence Party	For Brexit and Beyond; Time To Get On With Brexit!	
Scotland	Scottish Greens	Demand Climate Action!	
Scotland	Scottish National Party	Stronger for Scotland; It's Time to Choose Our Own Future	
Wales	Plaid Cymru	Wales, It's Us / Ni yw Cymru	
Northern Ireland	Alliance Party of Northern Ireland	Demand Better	
Northern Ireland	Democratic Unionist Party	Let's Get the UK Moving AGAIN; Let's get Northern Ireland Working Again	
Northern Ireland	Green Party in Northern Ireland		
Northern Ireland	Sinn Féin	Time for Unity	
Northern Ireland	Social Democratic and Labour Party	Stop Boris, Stop Brexit	
Northern Ireland	Ulster Unionist Party	Northern Ireland needs a change Let's change together	

=== 2024 general election ===
	Party	Slogan	Ref.
National	Conservative Party	Clear Plan. Bold Action. Secure Future	
National	Green Party of England and Wales	Real Hope. Real Change.	
National	Labour Party	Change	
National	Liberal Democrats	For A Fair Deal	
National	Reform UK	Britain Needs Reform	
National	Workers Party GB	Britain Deserves Better	
Scotland	Alba Party	YES to Scottish Independence	
Scotland	Scottish Greens	Vote Like Our Future Depends On It	
Scotland	Scottish National Party	A Future Made In Scotland	
Wales	Plaid Cymru	For fairness, for ambition, for Wales.	
Northern Ireland	Alliance Party of Northern Ireland	Leading Change for Everyone	
Northern Ireland	Democratic Unionist Party	Speaking Up for Northern Ireland; Working and Winning for You; Making NI Work	
Northern Ireland	Green Party in Northern Ireland	Greener, Cleaner, Fairer	
Northern Ireland	Sinn Féin	Strong Leadership, Positive Change	
Northern Ireland	Social Democratic and Labour Party	An Election for Change	
Northern Ireland	Traditional Unionist Voice	Restore the Union	
Northern Ireland	Ulster Unionist Party	Making Northern Ireland Work.	

== Senedd elections ==
=== 1999 National Assembly for Wales election ===
Party	Slogan	Welsh Translation	Ref.
Labour Party in Wales	New Labour, New Wales; Working Hard for Wales; Standing Up for Wales	Llafur Newydd, Cymru Newydd; Gweithio'n Galed Dros Gymru; Sefyll Dros Gymru	
Welsh Conservatives	Fair Play for All	Chwarae Teg i Bawb	
Plaid Cymru	A New Beginning for Wales	Dechreuad Newydd i Gymru	
Welsh Liberal Democrats	Liberate Wales from One-Party Rule	Rhyddhau Cymru o Reol Un Blaid	

=== 2003 National Assembly for Wales election ===
Party	Slogan	Welsh Translation	Ref.
Welsh Labour	Working Together for Wales; Welsh Labour: The True Party of Wales	Gweithio Gyda'n Gilydd dros Gymru; Llafur Cymru: Gwir Blaid Cymru	
Welsh Conservatives	Fighting for the Vulnerable	Ymladd dros y Diamddiffyn	
Welsh Liberal Democrats	Led by Labour, Driven by the Liberal Democrats; 100 Lib Dem Policies Delivered in Coalition	Arweinir gan Lafur, Wedi'i Yrru gan y Democratiaid Rhyddfrydol; 100 o Bolisïau Democratiaid Rhyddfrydol yn Cael eu Cyflwyno Mewn Clymblaid	

=== 2007 National Assembly for Wales election ===
Party	Slogan	Welsh Translation	Ref.
Welsh Labour	Building a Better Wales	Adeiladu Cymru Well	
Welsh Conservatives	Vote Welsh Conservative for a Change	Pleidleisiwch y Ceidwadwyr Cymreig dros Newid	
Plaid Cymru	Make a Difference! Kick Labour Into Touch	Gwneud Gwahaniaeth! Ciciwch Lafur Mewn Cysylltiad	
Welsh Liberal Democrats	A Fair, Green Future	Dyfodol Teg, Gwyrdd	

=== 2011 National Assembly for Wales election ===
Party	Slogan	Welsh Translation	Ref.
Welsh Labour	Standing Up for Wales	Sefyll Dros Gymru	
Welsh Conservatives	A New Voice for Wales	Llais Newydd i Gymru	
Plaid Cymru	For a Better Wales	Dros Gymru Well	
Welsh Liberal Democrats	Wales Can Do Better	Gall Cymru Yn Wneud Yn Well	

=== 2016 National Assembly for Wales election ===
Party	Slogan	Welsh Translation	Ref.
Welsh Labour	Together for Wales	Gyda'n gilydd dros Gymru	
Welsh Conservatives	Real Change with the Welsh Conservatives	Newid Gwirioneddol Gyda'r Ceidwadwyr Cymreig	
Plaid Cymru	The Change Wales Needs	Y Newid sydd ei Angen ar Gymru	
Welsh Liberal Democrats	A Wales That Works For You	Cymru Sy'n Gweithio i Chi	
UK Independence Party	A Strong Voice for Wales	Llais Cryf i Gymru	
Wales Green Party	For People, for Planet, for Wales	Dros Bobl, Dros y Blaned, Dros Gymru	

=== 2021 Senedd election ===
Party	Slogan	Welsh Translation	Ref.
Welsh Labour	Build Back Fairer; Moving Wales Forward; If You Value It, Vote for It	Adeiladu'n ôl Tecach; Symud Cymru Ymlaen; Caru Fe, Cadwch E	
Welsh Conservatives	Let's Build a Better Wales: More Jobs. Better Hospitals. First Class Schools.	Awn Ati i Adeiladu: Mwy o Swyddi. Ysbytai Gwell. Ysgolion Rhagorol.	
Plaid Cymru	Vote for Wales; Time for Change; Don't Want a Tory for a Neighbour? Vote Plaid Cymru Not Labour.	O Blaid Cymru; Amser i Newid; Ddim Eisiau Tori i Gymydog? Pleidleisiwch Plaid Cymru Nid Llafur.	
Welsh Liberal Democrats	Putting Recovery First; Put Recovery First; Community Politics	Gwneud Adfywio yn Flaenoriaeth; Adfywio Yw'n Blaenoriaeth; Gwleidyddiaeth Gymunedol	
Reform UK	Changing Politics for Good	Newid Gwleidyddiaeth er Da	
UK Independence Party	Scrap the Senedd; Wales Forever, Britain Together; Fed Up With Politicians? Vote to Put Them Out of a Job.	Diddymu'r Senedd; Cymru Am Byth, Prydain Yn Un; Wedi cael llond bol ar wleidyddion? Pleidleisiwch i'w Rhoi Allan o Swydd.	
Wales Green Party	Transform Wales	Trawsnewid Cymru	
Propel	Better for Wales; Wales Needs Champions; Not Politics as Usual	Gwel i Gymru; Mae Cymru Angen Pencampwyr; Nid Gwleidyddiaeth fel Arfer	
Gwlad	Not Left, Not Right, Just Welsh	Ddim Yn Chwith, Ddim Yn Dde, Dim Ond Cymraeg	

== Scottish Parliament elections ==
=== 1999 Scottish Parliament election ===
Party	Slogan	Ref.
Scottish Labour	Building Scotland's Future	
Scottish Conservatives	Scotland First	
Scottish National Party	EnterpriseCompassionDemocracy; A Penny for Scotland	
Scottish Liberal Democrats	Raising the Standard	
Scottish Socialist Party	A Socialist Vision for a New Scotland	
Scottish Greens	Caring for Scotland	

=== 2003 Scottish Parliament election ===
Party	Slogan	Ref.
Scottish Labour	On Your Side	
Scottish Conservatives	Time to Do Something About It	
Scottish National Party	Release our Potential	
Scottish Liberal Democrats	Make the Difference Fresh Thinking for Four More Years	
Scottish Socialist Party	For a free socialist republic; another Scotland is possible	
Scottish Greens	reach for the future...	

=== 2007 Scottish Parliament election ===
Party	Slogan	Ref.
Scottish Labour	Building Scotland	
Scottish Conservatives		
Scottish National Party	It's time to move forward.	
Scottish Liberal Democrats	We think Scotland has a bright future.	
Scottish Socialist Party	People not Profit	
Scottish Greens	Act Now: Choose a Green Future	

=== 2011 Scottish Parliament election ===
Party	Slogan	Ref.
Scottish Labour	Fighting for what really matters	
Scottish Conservatives	Common Sense for Scotland	
Scottish National Party	Re-elect a Scottish Government Working for Scotland	
Scottish Liberal Democrats	Taking Scotland Forward	
Scottish Socialist Party	Building a Better Scotland	
Scottish Greens		

=== 2016 Scottish Parliament election ===
Party	Slogan	Ref.
Scottish Labour	Invest in Scotland's Future	
Scottish Conservatives	A Strong Opposition - A Stronger Scotland	
Scottish National Party	Stronger for Scotland	
Scottish Liberal Democrats	Be the best again.	
RISE – Scotland's Left Alliance	Another Scotland is Possible	
Scottish Greens	A better Scotland needs a bolder Holyrood	

=== 2021 Scottish Parliament election ===
Party	Slogan	Ref.
Scottish Labour		
Scottish Conservatives	Rebuild Scotland	
Scottish National Party	Scotland's Future	
Scottish Liberal Democrats	Put Recovery First	
Scottish Greens	Our Common Future	

=== 2026 Scottish Parliament election ===
Party	Slogan	Ref.
Scottish Labour	Scotland Needs Change	
Scottish Conservatives	Get Scotland Working	
Scottish National Party	On Scotland's Side	
Scottish Liberal Democrats	Change With Fairness At Its Heart	
Scottish Greens	Let's Demand Better	
Reform UK Scotland	Scotland Needs Reform	

== Northern Ireland Assembly elections ==
=== 1998 Northern Ireland Assembly ===
Party	Slogan	Ref.
Alliance Party of Northern Ireland	It's Time for Tomorrow... Together	
Democratic Unionist Party	Democracy - not Dublin rule!; Your Best Guarantee	
Green Party Northern Ireland		
Social Democratic and Labour Party	Now, Say Yes To A Future Together	
Sinn Féin	For Real Change - Building a New Ireland	
Ulster Unionist Party	Together Within the Union	

=== 2003 Northern Ireland Assembly ===
Party	Slogan	Ref.
Alliance Party of Northern Ireland	Alliance Works	
Democratic Unionist Party	Fair Deal	
Green Party Northern Ireland	Meeting the Challenges Seizing the Opportunities	
Progressive Unionist Party	How long are you prepared to wait...?	
Social Democratic and Labour Party	Reshaping Government, Rebuilding Public Services	
Sinn Féin		
Ulster Unionist Party	The Future not the Past	

=== 2007 Northern Ireland Assembly ===
Party	Slogan	Ref.
Alliance Party of Northern Ireland	Alliance Works; The Alternative	
Democratic Unionist Party	Getting it Right	
Green Party Northern Ireland	for all our futures	
Progressive Unionist Party	A New Dawn	
Social Democratic and Labour Party	let's deliver real progress	
Sinn Féin	Delivering for Ireland's Future	
Ulster Unionist Party	For All of Us	

=== 2011 Northern Ireland Assembly ===
Party	Slogan	Ref.
Alliance Party of Northern Ireland	Alliance Works; Leading Change	
Democratic Unionist Party	Moving Forward	
Green Party Northern Ireland	Economy for People and Planet	
Progressive Unionist Party	The Way Forward	
Social Democratic and Labour Party	Uniting People Building Prosperity	
Sinn Féin	Leadership Across Ireland	
Traditional Unionist Voice	Make Stormont Work FOR YOU	
Ulster Unionist Party	It's time to make Stormont work - for you	

=== 2016 Northern Ireland Assembly ===
Party	Slogan	Ref.
Alliance Party of Northern Ireland	Forward. Faster.	
Democratic Unionist Party	Strong Leadership for a Better Future	
Green Party Northern Ireland	Zero Waste	
Social Democratic and Labour Party	Build a Better Future	
Sinn Féin	Better With Sinn Féin / Níos fearr le Sinn Féin	
Traditional Unionist Voice	Straight talking Principled politics	
Ulster Unionist Party	Make It Work	

=== 2017 Northern Ireland Assembly ===
Party	Slogan	Ref.
Alliance Party of Northern Ireland	How to change Northern Ireland. For Good.	
Democratic Unionist Party	Standing Strong for Northern Ireland; Strong Leadership for a Better Future	
Green Party Northern Ireland		
Social Democratic and Labour Party	Taking Our Seats, Taking A Stand; Make Change Happen	
Sinn Féin	Equality Respect Integrity	
Traditional Unionist Voice	Drain the Swamp	
Ulster Unionist Party	Partnership, not Domination; Clean Up Stormont	

=== 2022 Northern Ireland Assembly ===
Party	Slogan	Ref.
Alliance Party of Northern Ireland	Together We Can	
Democratic Unionist Party	Real Action on the Issues that Matter to You	
Green Party Northern Ireland	It's Time.	
Social Democratic and Labour Party	People First	
Sinn Féin	Working For All / Ag obair do chách; Time for real change / An dom athrú cheart	
Traditional Unionist Voice	Principle Strength Integrity; No Sea Border	
Ulster Unionist Party	Making Northern Ireland Work; Build a Better Northern Ireland	
