= Our Contract with You =

2024 political manifesto by Reform UK

- Author: Reform UK
- Language: English
- Publication date: 17 June 2024
- Publication place: United Kingdom
- Media type: Political manifesto/Contract
- Pages: 28
- Text: Our Contract with You online

Our Contract with You is a political manifesto published in 2024 by the British party Reform UK under the leadership of Nigel Farage. The manifesto sets out the party's approach to policy, ahead of their campaign in the 2024 general election.

== Policies ==
On 17 June 2024, Reform UK launched their manifesto. The policy proposals include:

- Tax cuts, including: raising the minimum threshold of income tax to £20,000, raising the higher rate threshold from £50,271 to £70,000, abolishing stamp duty for properties below £750,000, and abolishing taxes on inheritances below £2 million.
- Reducing legal immigration by freezing "non-essential" immigration, and eliminating illegal immigration by ending the settlement of any illegal immigrants, returning migrants who arrive on boats crossing the English Channel back to France. To encourage companies to employ British workers, they would raise employers National Insurance to 20% for foreign workers.
- Scrapping and rejecting net zero as "the greatest act of negligence". Reform UK wants to increase drilling for gas and oil, seeing their expansion as growth opportunities. It would also "fast-track" clean nuclear energy and shale gas licences. It pledges to support the environment with tree planting, recycling and less single use plastics.
- Eradicating waiting lists within two years by giving the NHS an extra £17bn a year and increasing the use of the private sector in the NHS, giving tax breaks to nurses and doctors to increase their number, and other measures including less tax for private healthcare and insurance, offering vouchers for private healthcare and looking to France's insurance-based health model.
- Increasing the number of police officers by 40,000 in five years, "clamp down on all crime and antisocial behaviour", by instituting zero tolerance policing.
- Introducing a "patriotic curriculum" in schools, such that, for example, where imperialism or slavery is covered, examples are also given of non-European instances. "Transgender ideology" would be banned, no gender questioning, social transitioning or pronoun swapping would be allowed in schools, universities would have to offer two-year courses to reduce student debt. Scrap interest on student loans and extend the loan capital repayment periods to 45 years. Encouraging the use of private schools via a 20% tax relief on private schooling.
- Increasing defence spending to 2.5% of GDP in three years, and then to 3% over the following three. 30,000 additional people would be recruited to join the army.
- Scrapping HS2, saving, it says, £25bn. ULEZ and Low Traffic Neighbourhoods would be banned. National Infrastructure Commission and Infrastructure Bank merged. Focus on new rail and road infrastructure in coastal regions, Wales, the North and the Midlands. Public utilities and critical infrastructure would come under 50% public ownership, the other 50% being owned by UK pension funds.
- Increasing the farming budget to £3bn, focus on small farms, bring young people into farming.
- Stopping EU fleets taking British fishing quotas, ban massive supertrawlers, and other fisheries measures.
- Replacing the existing second chamber, the House of Lords, with a more democratic smaller alternative, having a referendum on the replacement of first-past-the-post voting with a system of proportional representation.
- Eliminating the TV licence fee, calling the BBC "institutionally biased".
- Leaving the European Convention on Human Rights.
- Leaving the World Health Organization (WHO) unless it is reformed.
- Immediately cutting the rate of corporation tax from 25% to 20% and then further reduce corporation tax to 15% in the third year of parliament.
- £150 billion per year in spending reductions, including public services and working-age benefits.

Reform UK says that the total cost of its manifesto would be £140 billion but say that they would raise £150 billion. According to Reform UK, this money would be raised from the scrapping of net zero subsidies, the ending of payments of interest on quantitive easing reserves to banks, the halving of foreign aid, cuts to working age benefits and other public spending reductions. The party says that it would "cut bureaucracy […] without touching frontline services," while the Institute for Fiscal Studies says that the savings required "would almost certainly require substantial cuts to the quantity or quality of public services" and that the sums of the costs of tax cuts and spending increases and savings proposed "do not add up" and were based on "extremely optimistic assumptions".

Analysis has found that Reform UK's tax plans disproportionately benefit high earners. Reform UK wants to raise the higher rate threshold of tax from £50,271 to £70,000, which would result in a tax cut of close to £6,000 for the top 10% of earners and far outweigh any benefit to the lowest earners.

== See also ==
- Contract with America
- Change
- Clear Plan. Bold Action. Secure Future.
- For a Fair Deal
