= Prospective parliamentary candidate =

Term in British politics

In British politics, a prospective parliamentary candidate (PPC) is a candidate selected by political parties to contest under individual Westminster constituencies in advance of a general election. The term originally came into use because of the strict limits on the maximum expenditure permitted to be incurred by an election candidate, regardless of whether the election had been formally called. The candidates were termed "prospective" because referring to them simply as a candidate would arguably trigger the moment when money spent to promote them would need to be included in their declaration of expenses after the election.

In 2004, however, the law was changed so that the trigger for election expenses being accountable was to be the calling of an election and not the announcing of a candidacy. Some political parties had already started to use terms such as "parliamentary spokesperson", believing that some voters were confused by the unusual word "prospective"; however, the older form of words continues to be widely used, despite these changes in the law.

== See also ==
- Elections in the United Kingdom § Parliamentary candidate selection
- Electoral Commission (United Kingdom)
- Presumptive nominee
