= Slogan (disambiguation) =

A slogan is a memorable motto or phrase.

Slogan may also refer to:

- Joseph Slogan (born 1931), Canadian politician
- Slogan (film), a 1969 French film
- Slogans (film), a 2001 Albanian film
- "Slogans" (song), a remixed version of Bob Marley song released in 2005
- Slogan (heraldry)
- Slogan, a font designed by Aldo Novarese (1957)

== See also ==
- Lists of slogans
- Tagline
