= Political positions of Rishi Sunak =

Political positions of former UK Prime Minister Rishi Sunak

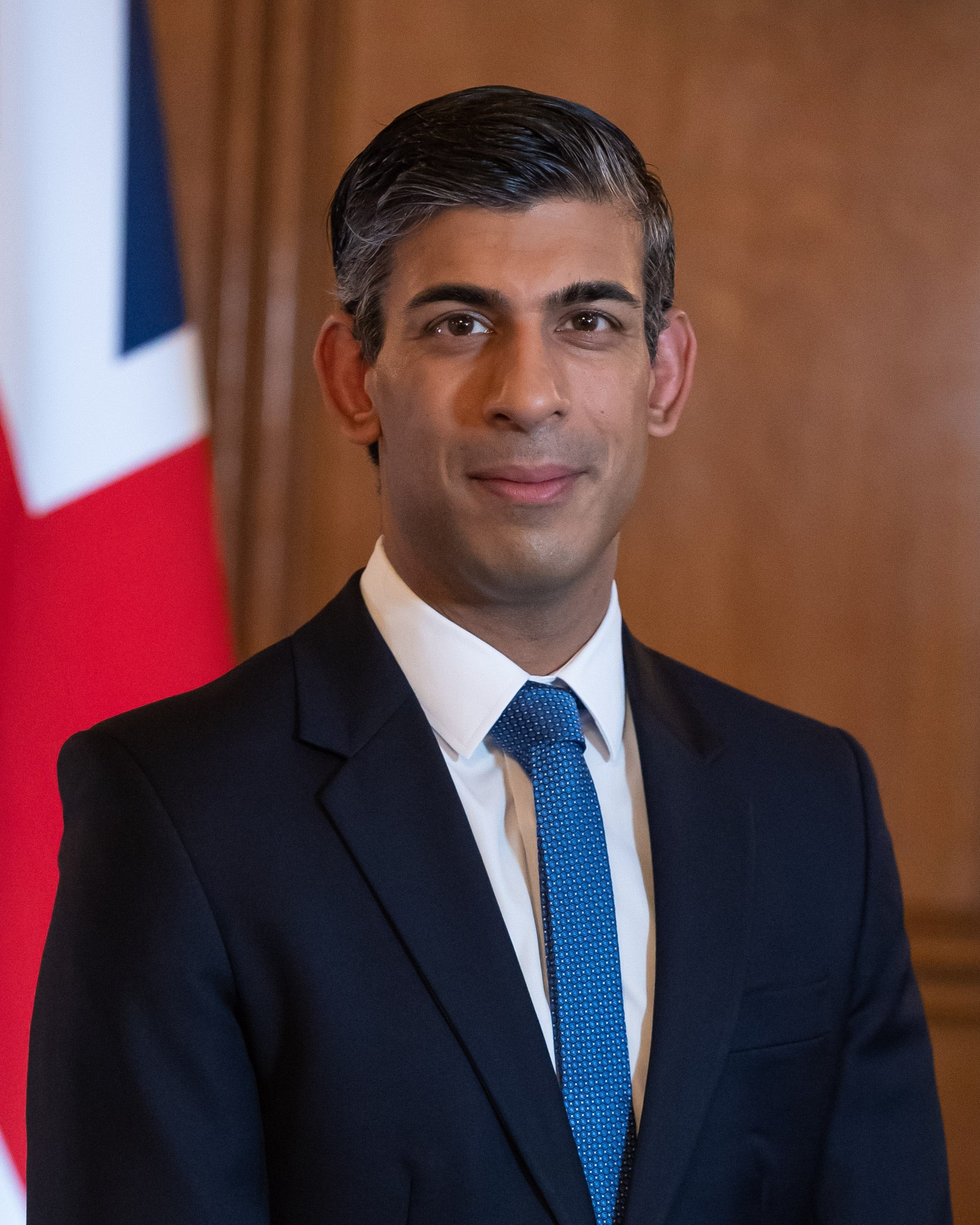
Prime ministerial portrait, 2022

Rishi Sunak is a British politician who served as the prime minister of the United Kingdom and Leader of the Conservative Party from 2022 to 2024; after the 2024 general election in July 2024, he became Leader of the Opposition until the election of Kemi Badenoch as his successor as Conservative leader in October. The first British Indian to hold those offices, Sunak has been Member of Parliament (MP) for Richmond and Northallerton, previously Richmond (Yorks), since 2015. He is the most recent Conservative Party prime minister.

Sunak has been described as a moderate within his party with a technocratic or managerial leadership style. According to Euronews, Sunak is "frequently perceived as a pragmatist and as belonging to the centre-ground of the Conservative Party". He opposed the economic policies of Liz Truss and predicted they would result in economic damage, and although described as a fellow Thatcherite, he is viewed as less economically liberal than Truss. In April 2023, Sunak's perception as a centrist contrasted with descriptions of his government's policies on transgender and migration issues as being socially conservative, with Jessica Elgot of The Guardian describing Sunak as "perhaps the most socially conservative PM of his generation".

Robert Shrimsley of the Financial Times described Sunak as someone whose "easy manner, career in global finance and ethnic background might suggest a more cosmopolitan conservative", even though he is socially conservative and pragmatic. Meanwhile, the New Statesman described Sunak as uneasily straddling both liberal-conservative and national-conservative instincts. In July 2023, The Economist described him as "the most right-wing Conservative prime minister since Margaret Thatcher".

== Assisted dying for terminally ill adults ==
In June 2025, Sunak voted in favour of legalising assisted dying for terminally ill adults in England and Wales.

== Crime and anti-terror strategy ==
On crime, Sunak proposed an automatic one-year extension to prison sentences for prolific criminals, as well as cutting the minimum sentence before a foreign criminal is eligible for deportation from twelve months to six. In August 2022, he proposed life imprisonment for leaders of child grooming gangs, and for police to record the ethnicity of those involved in such gangs. He also proposed widening the Prevent strategy by widening the definition of "extremism".

Sunak opposes the death penalty.

== COVID-19 pandemic lockdowns ==
Sunak said he had opposed recommendations by government medical advisers for a second "circuit-breaker" lockdown in September 2020 due to the potential impact on jobs and the economy. Then–health secretary Matt Hancock said that Sunak had put Johnson under "enormous pressure" not to introduce further restrictions during this time although Sunak maintained he had only advised Johnson on economic matters in order to help him reach a decision.

According to the diary of Patrick Vallance, he was told by Dominic Cummings that Sunak had argued to "just let people die" during an argument over imposing a second lockdown in October 2020. Sunak denied the "let people die" claim, pointing to the fact that Vallance did not hear the phrase but merely claimed to have been told about it by Cummings.

== European Union ==
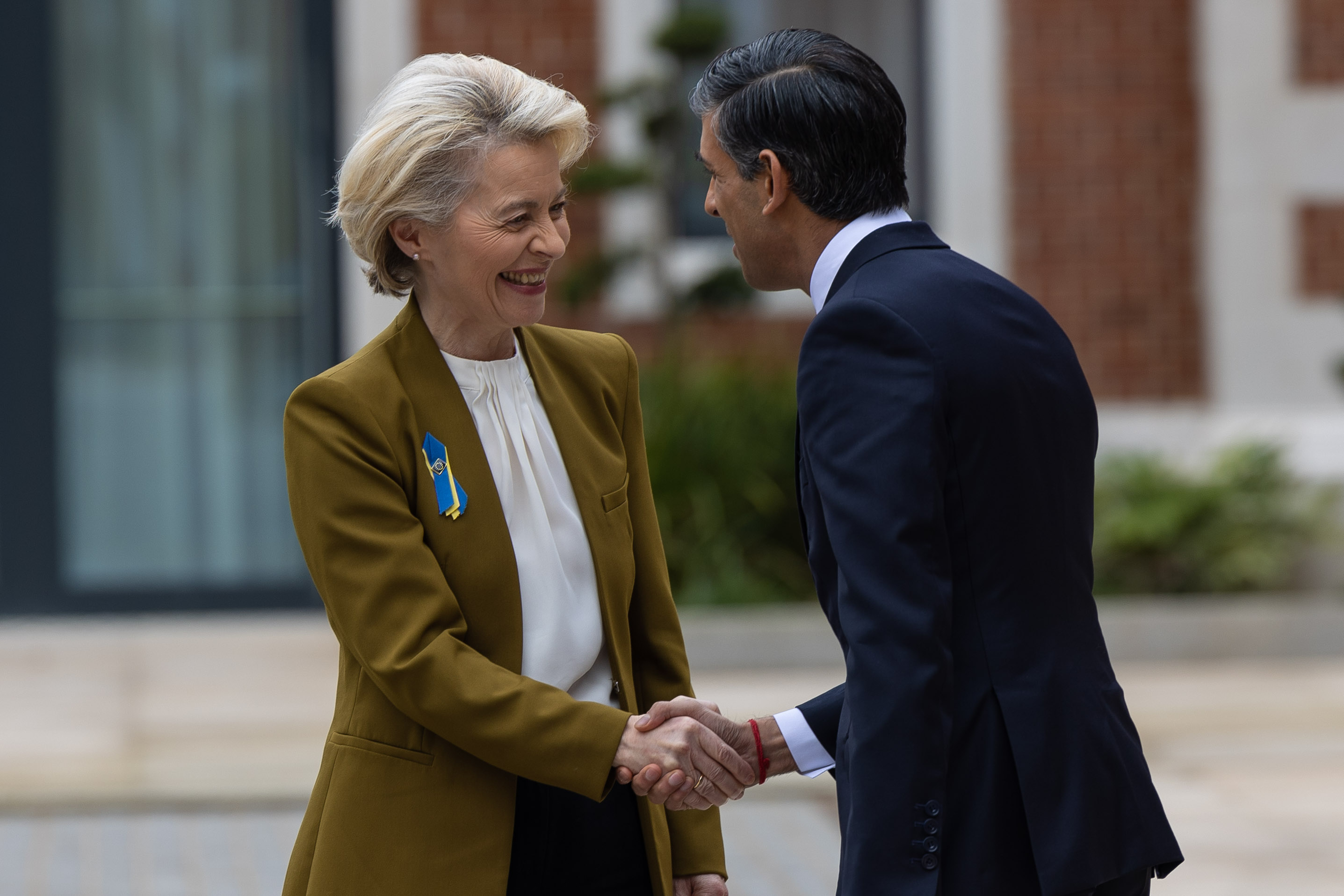
Ursula von der Leyen and Sunak in Windsor on 27 February 2023 to announce the finalised Windsor Framework agreement between the EU and UK

Sunak supported the Leave campaign during the 2016 United Kingdom European Union (EU) membership referendum. Speaking in 2022, Sunak said: "I voted for Brexit, I believe in Brexit." Sunak also said the UK would not be pursuing a relationship with the EU post-Brexit if the UK had to align with EU laws. In January 2023, Sunak confirmed intentions to remove EU legislation from the UK statute book that year, saying that it should be a "collective effort".

In February 2023, Sunak negotiated a proposed agreement with the EU on Northern Ireland's trading arrangements which was published as the "Windsor Framework". On 27 February, Sunak delivered a statement to the House of Commons, saying that the proposed agreement "protects Northern Ireland's place in our Union. On 22 March, the date of the parliamentary vote, 22 Conservative MPs and six DUP MPs voted against the government legislation. The vote ultimately passed by 515 votes to 29.

== Energy and the environment ==
Sunak signed the Conservative Environment Pledge (CEP), as shown on the Conservative Environment Network (CEN) website which has the support of approximately 127 MPs. The CEP's five main commitments are using Brexit freedoms for the environment and sustainable farming, backing British clean energy suppliers to boost energy security, encouraging the use of domestic insulation and electric vehicle charging points, implementing the Environment Act, and backing technologies that will help to achieve clean growth. During the leadership contest held over summer 2022, Sunak told the CEN that he was engaged with the protection of the environment for future generations.

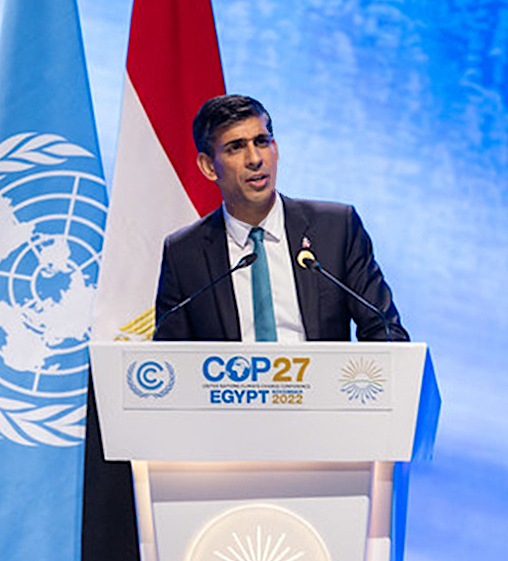
Sunak giving a speech at the COP27 summit in Egypt, 7 November 2022

Sunak has said he is committed to keeping the legal commitment of reaching net zero by 2050. During the July–September 2022 Conservative Party leadership election, he said that he intended to make the UK energy independent by 2045, while advocating for more offshore windpower, more solar panels on rooftops and improved insulation of homes to make them more energy efficient. Sunak is said to have listened to fellow MPs with a green agenda and that he was a believer in net zero for the UK. Sunak also voted against a call for the UK to eliminate most greenhouse gas emissions from transportation by 2030.

While campaigning in August 2022, Sunak wrote that he would restrict the use of solar panels on farmland but would make sure solar is installed on commercial buildings, properties and sheds, saying "on my watch, we will not lose swathes of our best farmland to solar farms." The trade association Solar Energy UK said the solar industry was "deeply concerned" with the intentions of both candidates.

Sunak has backed fracking, where it is supported by local residents. On 19 October in the debate on "Ban on Fracking for Shale Gas Bill (Division 66)", he voted with the government against the ban on fracking. Fracking had been banned by the government in November 2019 after a report by the Oil and Gas Authority found that it was not possible at that time to predict the probability or strength of earthquakes caused by fracking.

While chancellor, Sunak attended COP26 in Glasgow. During the speech he gave on 3 November, he said that he felt optimism despite daunting challenges and that by bringing together finance ministers, businesses and investors, COP 26 could begin to deliver targets from the Paris Agreement. He outlined three actions: First, the need for increased public investment, with the UK committing £100 million to the Taskforce on Access to Climate Finance. He announced support for a new Capital Markets Mechanism which will issue green bonds in the UK to fund renewable energy in developing countries. Second, mobilising private finance, with the Glasgow Financial Alliance for Net Zero bringing together organisations with assets over $130 trillion to be deployed. Third, the rewiring of the entire global financial system for net zero, which would include better climate data, mandatory sustainability disclosures, climate risk surveillance and stronger global reporting standards. Also announced was that the UK will become the first ever 'Net Zero Aligned Financial Centre'.

During an interview in July 2022, Sunak said that wind generation would be a part of his governments' energy policies, but he wanted to reassure communities that there would not be a relaxation of the current onshore planning laws, with more of a focus on offshore wind farms. This stance was confirmed by the PM's press team in October, who said that Sunak wants "offshore not onshore wind". When asked about wind generation by MP Alan Whitehead at Prime Minister's Questions on 26 October, Sunak responded that, as outlined in the Conservative manifesto of 2019, he would focus on long term energy security, including more offshore wind. Onshore wind generation was made difficult by the National Planning Policy Framework 2016 Update, but as part of his predecessors' policies, the planning laws were set to be relaxed.

== Foreign policy ==
In relation to the Russian invasion of Ukraine, Sunak supports Ukraine and economic sanctions against Russia but opposes British military intervention in Ukraine. In July 2022, during the July–September 2022 Conservative Party leadership election, Sunak called China the "biggest long-term threat" to the UK, adding that "They torture, detain and indoctrinate their own people, including in Xinjiang and Hong Kong, in contravention of their human rights. And they have continually rigged the global economy in their favour by suppressing their currency". He accused China of supporting Russian president Vladimir Putin and that it was "stealing our technology and infiltrating our universities". Sunak softened his attitude after becoming prime minister, calling the country a "systemic challenge" instead of a "threat", and that the West would "manage this sharpening competition, including with diplomacy and engagement".

Sunak described Saudi Arabia as a "partner" and "ally", but said that the British government does not ignore human rights violations in Saudi Arabia. According to Sunak, "It's absolutely right that" the British government "engages with our partners and allies around the world as we contemplate how best to ensure energy security for this country." During his chancellorship, Sunak also opposed US president Joe Biden's plan to introduce a minimum 21 per cent global business tax. Additionally, Sunak supported the recognition of Jerusalem as the capital of Israel. During the Gaza war, Sunak stated that "Israel has an absolute right to defend itself." In January 2024, he rejected South Africa's ICJ genocide case against Israel.

After leaving office in July 2024, Sunak condemned the attempted assassination of Donald Trump, tweeting "In a democracy, you must be able to speak freely and stand for what you believe in. Violence and intimidation must never be allowed to prevail. My thoughts and prayers are with President Trump and the victims of this appalling attack."

=== Russia and Ukraine ===
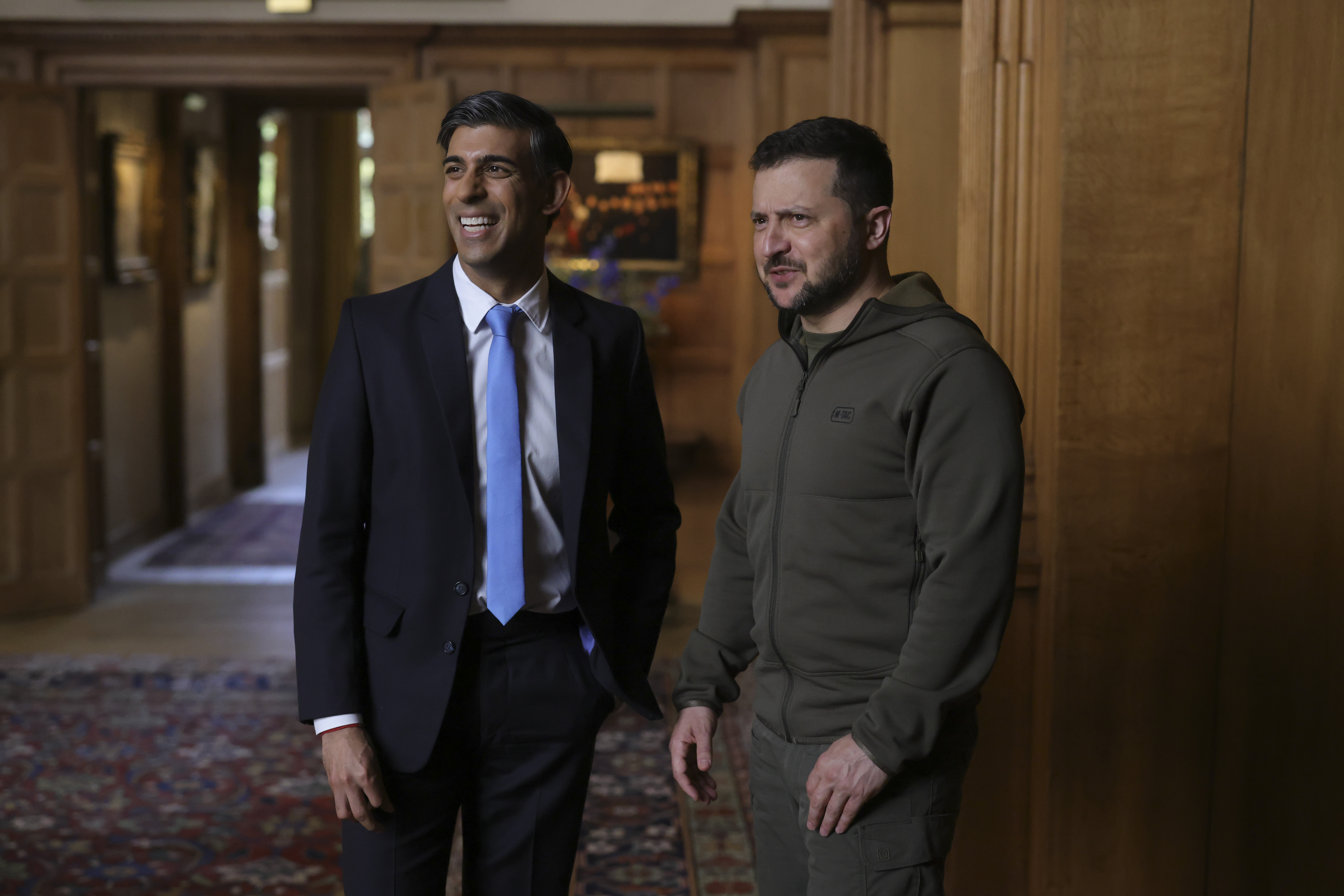
Sunak meeting with Ukrainian president Volodymyr Zelenskyy at Chequers, May 2023

Following the 15 November missile explosion in Poland, Sunak met US president Joe Biden and delivered a speech about it. Sunak later met Ukrainian president Volodymyr Zelenskyy, and pledged to give Ukraine £50 million in aid. After meeting Zelenskyy, Sunak said: "I am proud of how the UK stood with Ukraine from the very beginning. And I am here today to say the UK and our allies will continue to stand with Ukraine, as it fights to end this barbarous war and deliver a just peace."

Sunak visited Ukraine on 12 January 2024 to sign a new UK-Ukraine Agreement on Security Cooperation with Zelenskyy promising £2.5 billion in military aid to Ukraine, including long-range missiles, artillery ammunition, air defence and maritime security, in addition to £200 million to be spent on military drones, making the United Kingdom the largest deliverer of drones to Ukraine out of any nation according to Downing Street.

=== Israel and Palestine ===
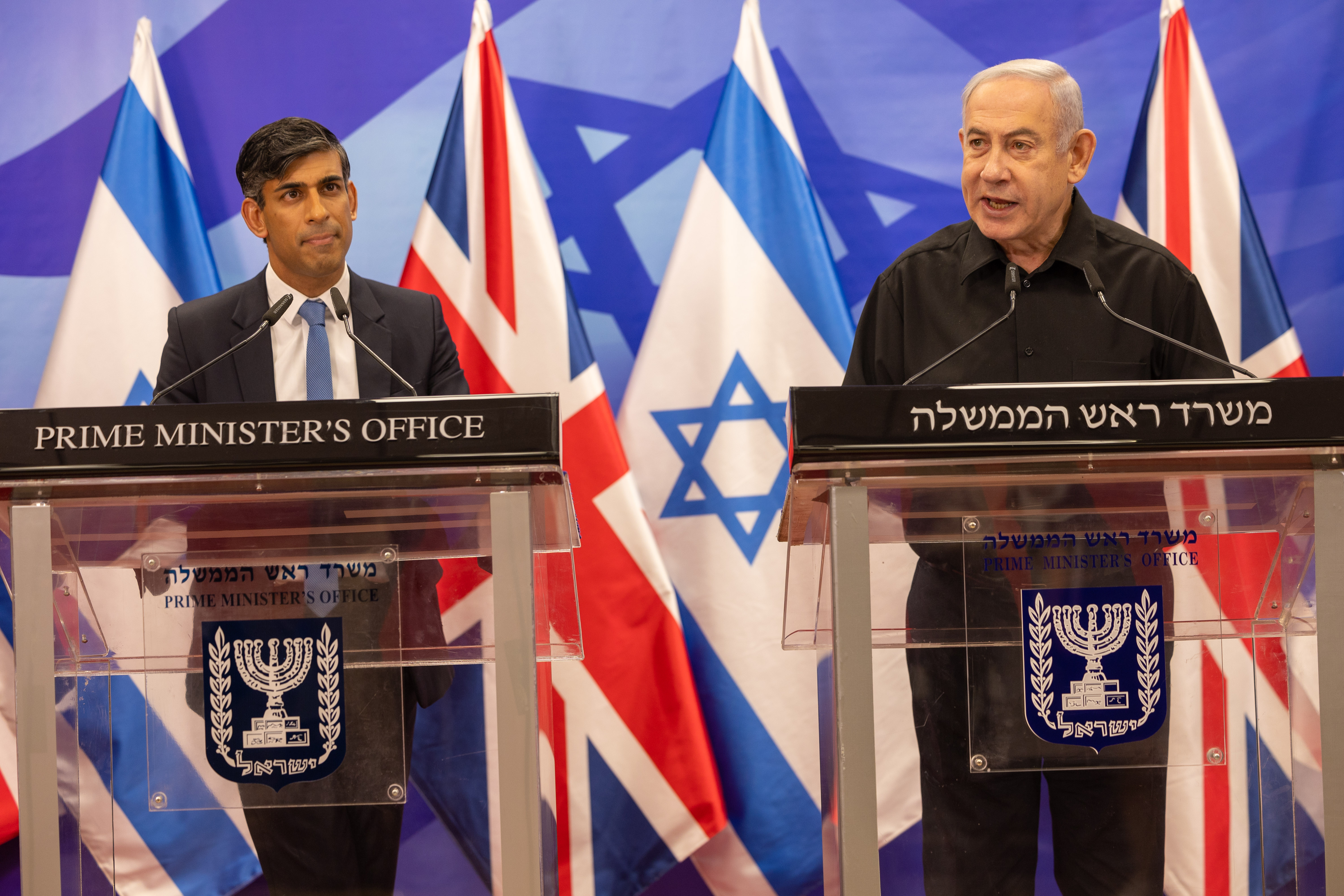
Sunak with the prime minister of Israel Benjamin Netanyahu in Jerusalem, 19 October 2023

In October 2023, Hamas launched a surprise attack on Israel that devolved into a war and a growing humanitarian crisis in the Gaza Strip. Sunak pledged the UK's support for Israel and declared that Israel "has an absolute right to defend itself". Sunak backed calls for humanitarian pauses to allow for aid to be brought into Gaza, although he initially rejected calls for a full ceasefire as he argued that this would only benefit Hamas. Israel used British-supplied weapons in the war. However, Sunak later condemned the high number of civilian casualties during the Israeli bombardment of Gaza and called for a "sustainable ceasefire" in which all Israeli hostages are returned to Israel, attacks against Israel cease and humanitarian aid is allowed into Gaza. His government supports the two-state solution as a resolution to the conflict.

When the International Criminal Court prosecutor Karim Ahmad Khan announced that he would seek to charge Israeli Prime Minister Benjamin Netanyahu with war crimes, Sunak denounced the move as "unhelpful" and accused Khan of drawing a moral equivalence between Israel and Hamas.

== Technology policy ==
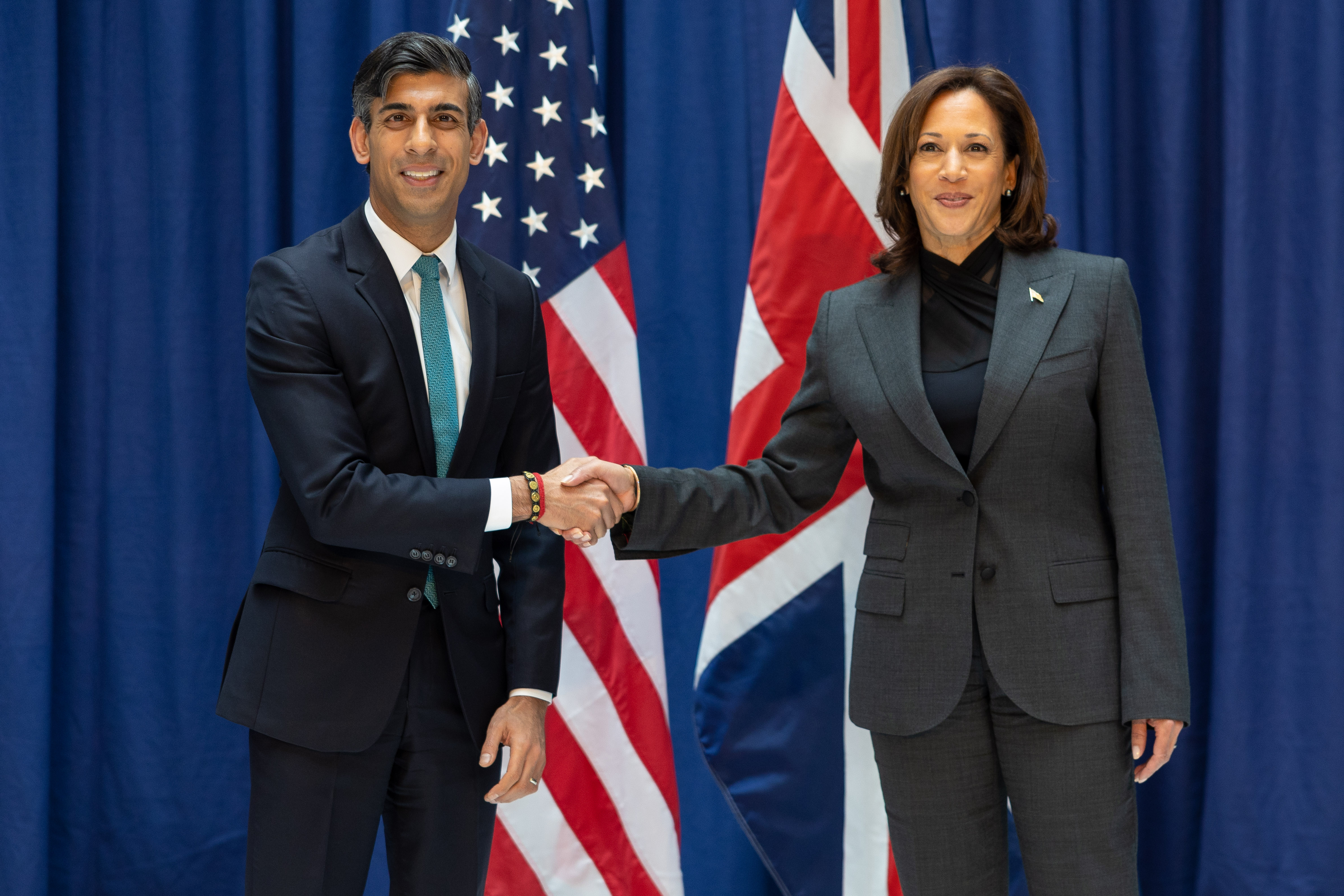
Sunak with US vice president Kamala Harris, February 2023

In 2023, Sunak expressed his intention to "make the U.K. not just the intellectual home but the geographical home of global AI safety regulation" and unveiled plans for an AI Safety Summit, which was held in November 2023 and had notable attendees including Elon Musk, Kamala Harris and Nick Clegg. He emphasized the need for independent safety evaluations, stating that AI companies cannot "mark their own homework".

== LGBT+ and transgender rights ==
Sunak was elected to Parliament in 2015 and therefore did not vote on same sex marriage but praised the Conservative Party for legalising same sex marriage in 2023 on a X post. However in 2019, he abstained from voting on the Northern Ireland (Executive Formation etc) Act 2019 which legalised same sex marriage in Northern Ireland.

In July 2022, Sunak said that he wanted the UK to be "the safest and greatest country in the world to be LGBT+". When asked about perceived transphobia within his party, he stated that "prejudice against transgender people is wrong. The Conservative Party is an open, welcoming family to everybody across society, no matter who they are and irrespective of their background." Several of Sunak's other political statements have been described as "anti-transgender" by LGBT advocates. He has said that he views biology as "important" and "fundamental" regarding public toilets and competitive sports.

In April 2023, Sunak agreed with a statement that all women "haven't got a penis". In October, he stated that it was "common sense" that "a man is a man and a woman is a woman". In February 2024, in response to Keir Starmer's alleged backtracking on "defining a woman" at Prime Minister's Questions, Sunak said that "in fairness, that was only 99% of a U-turn", referring to previous comments made by Starmer that "99.9% of women" do not have a penis. This was said on the same day that the mother of murdered transgender teenager Brianna Ghey was present at the Commons, and was harshly criticised by Starmer, LGBT groups (including Stonewall) and relatives of Ghey. Responding to criticism, Sunak stated "I've nothing but the most heartfelt sympathy for [Brianna Ghey's] entire family and friends. But to use that tragedy to detract from the very separate and clear point I was making about Keir Starmer's proven track record of multiple U-turns on major policies, because he doesn't have a plan, I think is both sad and wrong, and it demonstrates the worst of politics."

== Immigration ==
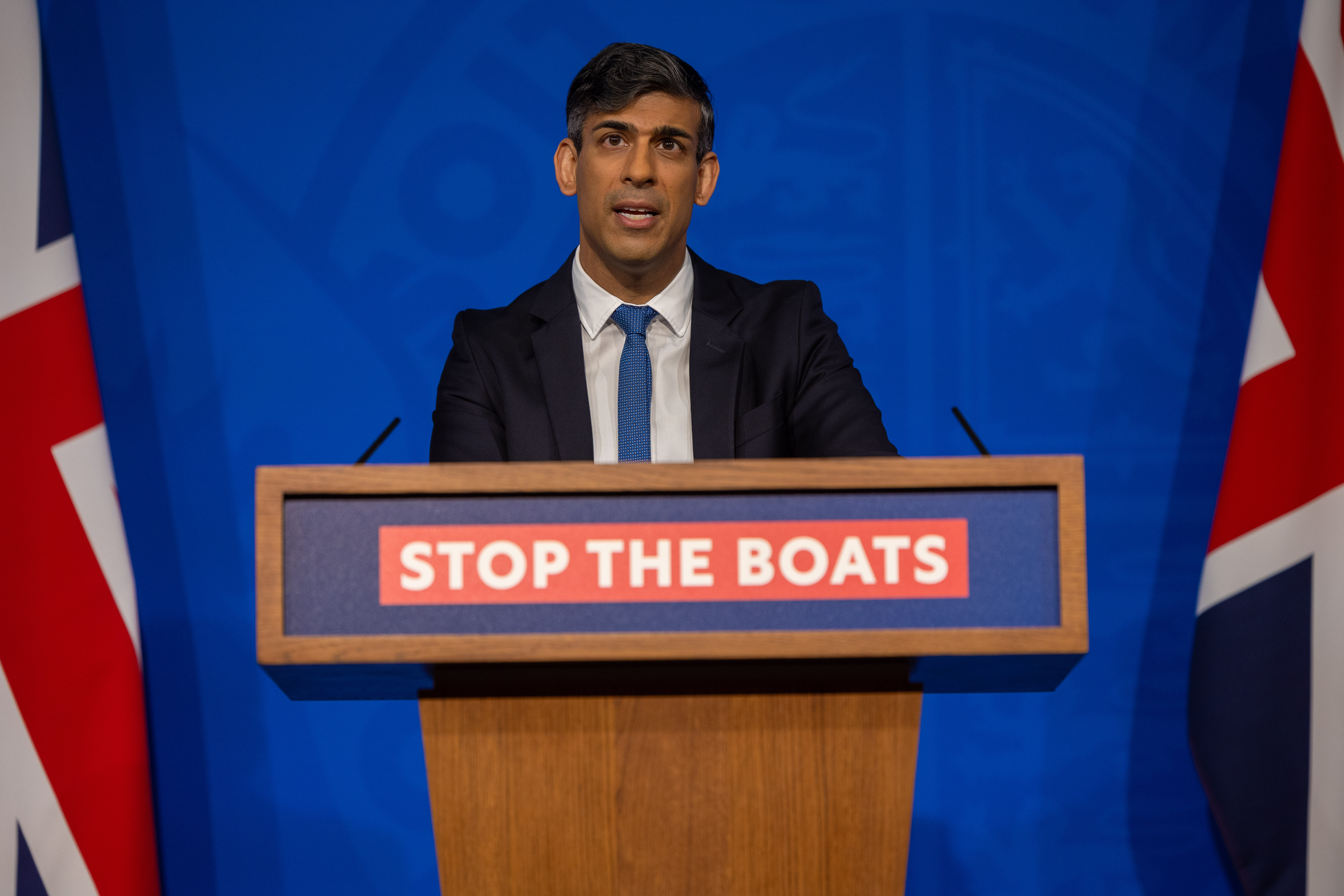
Sunak holds a press conference on the Rwanda asylum plan, 22 April 2024

Sunak expressed support for lowering net migration. An official spokesperson said Sunak was "committed to ensuring we have control over our borders and the public rightly expects us to control immigration and have a system that works best for the UK." He has said that the "current asylum system is broken and it needs to be fixed urgently", saying he would, in his first 100 days as prime minister, "tighten our statutory definition of who qualifies for asylum in the UK ... This will prevent anyone who enters the UK illegally from staying here", that the "Parliament will be given control of the number of refugees we accept each year", that he "cannot underestimate the role of data sharing which will make it easier to identify people who are in the UK illegally", and that the Rwanda asylum plan is "the right one". Responding to criticism surrounding some of his proposals about illegal immigration, Sunak said there was "absolutely nothing racist" about it. On 4 January 2023, Sunak set out his priorities for 2023, which included: "We will pass new laws to stop small boats, making sure that if you come to this country illegally, you are detained and swiftly removed."

In 2019 the Conservatives under Boris Johnson pledged to reduce net migration below 250,000 per year, but Sunak said in 2023 that the priority was not to reduce legal immigration but to stop illegal immigration. Nearly 30,000 undocumented migrants crossed the Channel in small boats to the UK in 2023. Long-term net migration to the United Kingdom (the number of people immigrating minus the number emigrating) reached a record high of 764,000 in 2022, with legal immigration at 1.26 million and emigration at 493,000. Of the 1,218,000 legal migrants coming to the UK in 2023, only 10% were EU Nationals.

Sunak continued the Rwanda asylum plan to have asylum seekers and illegal immigrants sent to Rwanda for processing. After the plan was blocked by the UK's Court of Appeal in June 2023 due to concerns over international law and the possibility of refoulement (persecution of those sent to Rwanda), Sunak vowed to appeal against the verdict to the Supreme Court.

On 15 November 2023, the Supreme Court upheld the ruling and declared the plan unlawful. In response, Sunak sent Cleverly to Rwanda to negotiate a treaty with Rwanda focused on preventing refoulement which must now be ratified by the British and Rwandan Parliaments. The government also introduced the Safety of Rwanda (Asylum and Immigration) Bill, emergency legislation giving ministers the power to disapply sections of the Human Rights Act 1998 and certain aspects of international law in order to allow them to declare Rwanda a safe country according to UK law. The bill was criticised by many on the right of the party for not going far enough, resulting in the resignation of the minister for immigration, Robert Jenrick.

On 12 December 2023 Sunak secured a government majority of 44 for the Safety of Rwanda Bill, despite the opposition of all other parties and abstentions from members of the European Research Group. After Sunak left office in July 2024, the Rwanda asylum plan was scrapped by Starmer's Labour government and replaced with the Border Security Command.
