= Get Brexit Done =

Slogan from the 2019 UK General election campaign

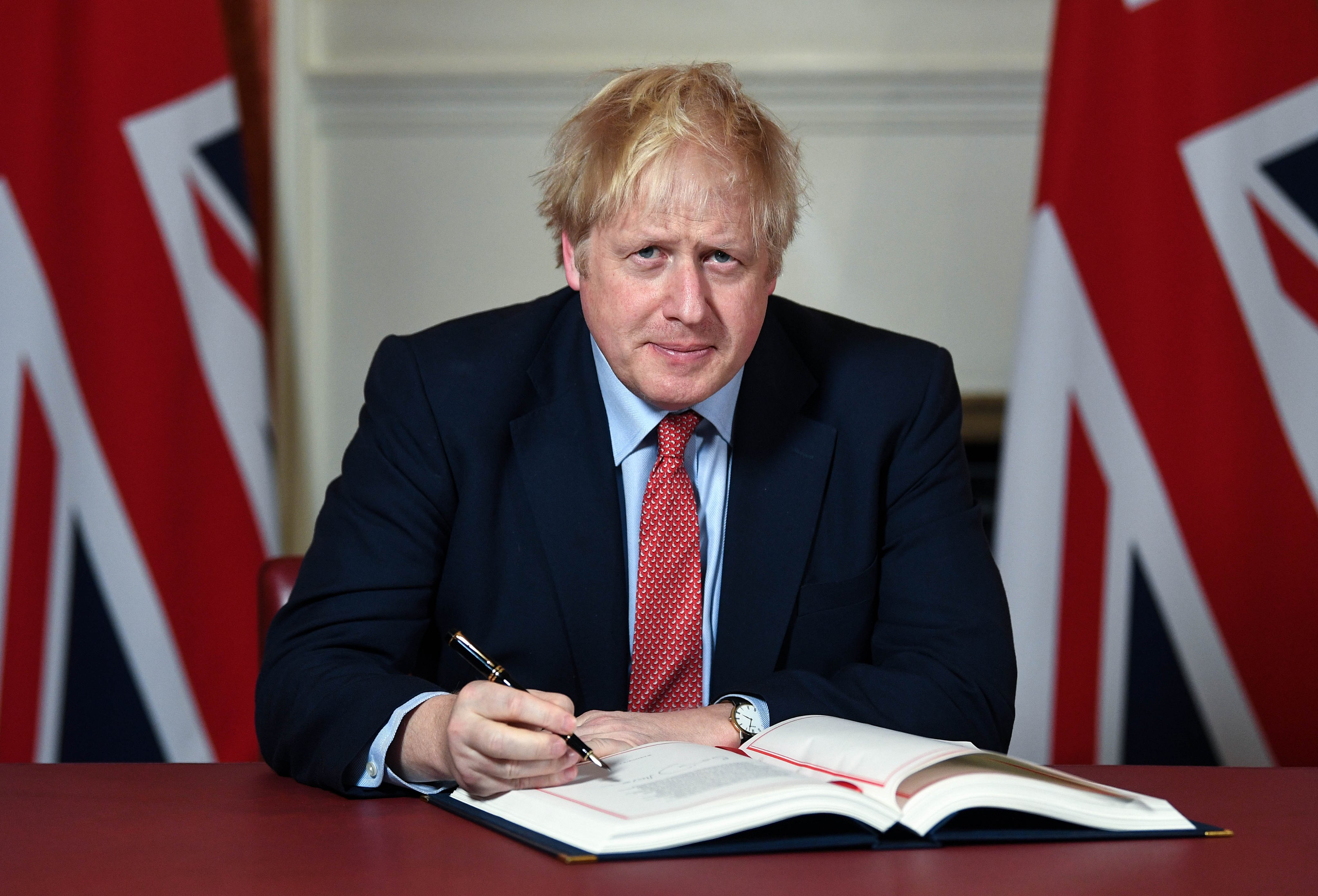
Prime Minister Boris Johnson signing the Withdrawal Agreement for the UK to leave the EU on 31 January 2020

Get Brexit Done was a political slogan frequently used by the British Conservative Party and former Prime Minister Boris Johnson in the run up to the 2019 general election. The slogan reflected the party's pledge to, if re-elected, facilitate the United Kingdom's withdrawal from the European Union by the end of January the following year.

== Background ==
After the 2016 EU membership referendum produced a result in favour of leaving the European Union, a period of debate within the United Kingdom and negotiations with the EU about the future began. In 2019, the UK fell into further political uncertainty when both prime minister Theresa May and her successor Boris Johnson failed to reach a consensus in the House of Commons for a withdrawal agreement on their terms or a withdrawal with no agreement at all.

By the time of the election campaign in late 2019, this meant that Brexit had dominated British politics for more than three years, remaining a divisive issue and creating a great deal of frustration amongst the general public. The idea for the slogan came from a focus group conducted by the Conservatives in a hotel in Northern England shortly before the election was called. During discussions about the Brexit process members of the group talked of wishing to "get it done".

== Campaign ==
The slogan was widely used on the Conservative Party's campaigning material and by its canvassers. It was also frequently used by senior Conservative politicians. In November 2019, the Conservatives launched their manifesto under the slogan "Get Brexit Done, Unleash Britain's Potential".

== Criticism ==
The Conservatives faced criticism for the slogan from a variety of directions. Ex-British diplomat Sir Ivan Rogers accused the party of either misunderstanding the situation or deliberately attempting to "mislead the British public". The Guardian's Brussels correspondent described leaving the EU as "only the start of a new phase in the Brexit odyssey."

== Effectiveness ==
Research conducted by The Guardian a week before the election found that the slogan resonated with voters in marginal constituencies whilst another poll by Opinium from a day or two before the election found the plurality of responders wanted the EU withdrawal agreement to be ratified. The Conservatives went on to win the election with a comfortable majority of seats.

The “Get Brexit Done” slogan “obviously played a part” in Johnson’s victory, says Tim Bale, professor of politics at Queen Mary, University of London, “partly because it appealed to leavers but also because it appealed to some remainers who are sick to the back teeth of Brexit and want to get it over with.”

== See also ==
- Get Brexit Done: Unleash Britain's Potential
