= Get Brexit Done: Unleash Britain's Potential =

Political manifesto published in 2019 by the Conservative Party

- Author: Conservative Party
- Language: English
- Series: Conservative general election manifestos
- Publication date: 24 November 2019
- Publication place: United Kingdom
- Media type: Political manifesto
- Preceded by: Forward, Together: Our Plan for a Stronger Britain and a Prosperous Future (2017)
- Followed by: Clear Plan. Bold Action. Secure Future. (2024)

Get Brexit Done: Unleash Britain's Potential is a political manifesto published in 2019 by the Conservative Party under the leadership of Boris Johnson, ahead of the 2019 general election. Johnson led the campaign to victory, with the Conservatives obtaining 365 seats; a majority of 80 seats.

== Overview ==
The manifesto began with a guarantee written by Boris Johnson, in which he said that if there was a majority of Conservative MPs, he would get their deal through Parliament and "get Brexit done in January and unleash the potential of our whole country". He also guaranteed:

- "Extra funding for the NHS, with 50,000 more nurses and 50 million more GP surgery appointments a year.
- 20,000 more police and tougher sentencing for criminals.
- An Australian-style points-based system to control immigration.
- Millions more invested every week in science, schools, apprenticeships and infrastructure while controlling debt.
- Reaching Net Zero by 2050 with investment in clean energy solutions and green infrastructure to reduce carbon emissions and pollution.
- Not raising the rate of income tax, VAT or National Insurance."

Johnson concluded the guarantee section of the manifesto by alleging that if Jeremy Corbyn's Labour and Nicola Sturgeon's Scottish National Party formed a coalition government, there would be two referendums on Brexit and Scottish independence in 2020.

The manifesto also included commitments to remove the Fixed Term Parliaments Act, defend the First Past the Post electoral system, introduce voter ID and maintain the voting age at 18.

== See also ==
- Get Brexit Done
