= Change (manifesto) =

Political manifesto published in 2024 by the British Labour Party

- Author: Labour Party
- Language: English
- Series: Labour general election manifestos
- Publication date: 13 June 2024
- Publication place: United Kingdom
- Media type: Political manifesto
- Preceded by: It's Time for Real Change (2019)

Change is a political manifesto published in 2024 by the British Labour Party under the leadership of Sir Keir Starmer. The manifesto set out the party's new approach to policy, ahead of their successful campaign in the 2024 general election, in which they won a landslide victory.

== Overview ==
The Labour general election campaign adopted "Change" as their slogan. When launching the manifesto, Starmer referred to it as "a fairer, healthier, a more secure Britain, at the service of working people, with growth from every community. A Britain ready to restore that promise. The bond that reaches through the generations and says – this country will be better for your children."

The manifesto itself focuses on economic growth, planning system reforms, infrastructure, what Starmer describes as clean energy, healthcare, education, childcare, crime, and strengthening workers' rights. It pledges a new publicly owned energy company (Great British Energy), a "Green Prosperity Plan", a Border Security Command, reducing patient waiting times in the National Health Service (NHS), and renationalisation of the railway network (Great British Railways). It includes wealth creation and "pro-business and pro-worker" policies. The manifesto also pledged to give votes to 16 year olds, reform the House of Lords, and to tax private schools, with money generated going into improving state education.

== Major points ==
=== First steps ===
During the 2024 general election campaign, six first steps were issued and detailed in the manifesto. The six steps are:

1. Deliver economic stability with tough spending rules, so the economy can grow and keep taxes, inflation and mortgages as low as possible.
2. Cut NHS waiting times with 40,000 more appointments each week, during evenings and weekends, paid for by cracking down on tax avoidance and non-dom loopholes.
3. Launch a new Border Security Command with hundreds of new specialist investigators and use counter-terror powers to smash criminal boat gangs.
4. Set up Great British Energy, a publicly owned clean power company, to cut bills for good and boost energy security, paid for by a windfall tax on oil and gas giants.
5. Crack down on antisocial behaviour, with more neighbourhood police paid for by ending wasteful contracts, tough new penalties for offenders, and a new network of youth hubs.
6. Recruit 6,500 new teachers in key subjects to set children up for life, work and the future, paid for by ending tax breaks for private schools.

=== Five missions ===
1. Kickstart economic growth.
2. Make Britain a clean energy superpower.
3. Take back our streets.
4. Break down barriers to opportunity.
5. Build an NHS fit for the future.

== Constitutional reform ==
The manifesto commits the next Labour government to bring about an immediate modernisation of the House of Lords, with legislation to remove the right of hereditary peers to sit and vote, and with a mandatory retirement age: "At the end of the Parliament in which a member reaches 80 years of age, they will be required to retire from the House of Lords." A Labour government would ensure all peers met high standards, would introduce a new participation requirement, and would strengthen the circumstances in which disgraced members could be removed. It would also reform the appointments process, to ensure quality, and would seek to improve the national and regional balance of the chamber.

The manifesto also states that "Labour is committed to replacing the House of Lords with an alternative second chamber that is more representative of the regions and nations", promising a public consultation on its proposals.

== Analysis ==
Channel 4 News's fact-checking of the manifesto found that a Labour government would "almost certainly preside over a lower net migration rate in the next few years – even if it's done little to bring this about" on the manifesto's immigration policies, while finding that it "may be difficult to evaluate in the future" whether a Labour government had met its pledge on GP outpatient appointments, and that the pledge on new teachers would "deliver half the increase in teacher numbers that the Conservatives managed in this parliament." Full Fact's fact-checking evaluated as accurate the manifesto's claims that Conservative governments since 2010 had raised the tax burden to a 70-year-high, had overseen a significant decrease in British Armed Forces staff, and a significant increase in child poverty. The Institute for Fiscal Studies described the manifesto as "not a manifesto for those looking for big numbers", saying there was "almost nothing in the way of definite promises on spending."

== Reactions ==
The Child Poverty Action Group criticised the manifesto for not committing to ending the two child benefit cap, saying that until it was ended, "real change won’t come for the four million children in poverty." The charity Humanists UK welcomed pledges on Lords reform, updating the curriculum, for a ban on conversion therapy, and for assurances that the UK would remain a member of the European Convention on Human Rights. It expressed disappointment that pre-manifesto Labour pledges on incorporating the UN Convention on the Rights of the Child into domestic law, tackling unregistered illegal schools, and parliamentary time for assisted dying did not feature.

== See also ==
- List of Labour Party (UK) general election manifestos
- Clear Plan. Bold Action. Secure Future., the 2024 Conservative Party manifesto
- For a Fair Deal, the 2024 Liberal Democrats manifesto
- Our Contract with You, the 2024 Reform UK manifesto/Contract
