= Clear Plan. Bold Action. Secure Future. =

2024 political manifesto by the British Conservative Party

- Author: Conservative Party
- Language: English
- Series: Conservative general election manifestos
- Publication date: 11 June 2024
- Publication place: United Kingdom
- Media type: Political manifesto
- Preceded by: Get Brexit Done: Unleash Britain's Potential (2019)

Clear Plan. Bold Action. Secure Future. is a political manifesto published in 2024 by the Conservative Party under the leadership of Rishi Sunak, ahead of the 2024 general election.

== Overview ==
The manifesto addressed the economy, taxes, welfare, expanding free childcare, education, healthcare, environment, energy, transport, community, culture, creative sector, sport, and crime. It pledged to lower taxes, increase education and NHS spending, deliver 92,000 more nurses and 28,000 more doctors, introduce a new model of National Service, and to treble Britain's offshore wind capacity and support solar energy.

The manifesto included a pledge to abolish stamp duty on homes worth up to £425,000 for first time buyers and expand the Help to Buy scheme. The Conservatives also pledged a recruitment of 8,000 new police officers and a rollout of facial recognition technology. Much of what was proposed was already incorporated in the 2023 and 2024 budgets.

== See also ==
- List of Conservative Party (UK) general election manifestos
- Change
- For a Fair Deal
- Our Contract with You
