= Lists of slogans =

This is an index of lists of slogans. A slogan is a memorable motto or phrase used as a repetitive expression of an idea or purpose.

== Business ==
- List of Coca-Cola slogans
- List of GMA Network slogans
- List of Harvey's slogans
- List of McDonald's marketing campaigns
- List of US Airways slogans
- List of Walmart Canada slogans
- List of Zellers slogans

== Politics ==
- List of political slogans
- List of Philippine presidential campaign slogans
- List of UK political slogans
- List of U.S. presidential campaign slogans
- List of slogans of the opposition to the U.S. involvement in the Vietnam War
- List of North Korean propaganda slogans

== Social ==
- LGBT slogans
- Slogans and terms derived from the September 11 attacks
- List of labor slogans

== Other ==
- List of U.S. state tourism slogans
- Slogans of the United States Army
