= For a Fair Deal =

2024 Liberal Democrat political manifesto

- Author: Liberal Democrats
- Language: English
- Series: Liberal Democrat general election manifestos
- Publication date: 10 June 2024
- Publication place: United Kingdom
- Media type: Political manifesto
- Preceded by: Stop Brexit, Build a Brighter Future (2019)

For a Fair Deal is a political manifesto published by the Liberal Democrats under the leadership of Ed Davey, ahead of the 2024 general election. The 116-page document was launched at campaign event in London to the tune of "Take a Chance on Me" by ABBA.

== Policies ==
BBC News identified 11 key policies in the manifesto:

- Providing free personal care in England modelled on the system in Scotland.
- Recruiting 8,000 more GPs and creating a target for most cancer patients to begin treatment within 62 days of an urgent referral.
- Increasing public spending by £27bn per year by 2029
- Scrapping the Rwanda asylum plan
- Reaching net zero by 2045
- Scrapping the two-child limit on certain benefits and reforming Carer's Allowance
- Increasing the early years pupil premium by triple to £1,000
- Speeding up the courts process
- Recognising non-binary identities and banning conversion therapy
- Granting 16-year-olds the vote and introducing proportional representation
- Rejoining the European single market

== See also ==
- List of Liberal Party and Liberal Democrats (UK) general election manifestos
- Change, the Labour Party manifesto
- Clear Plan. Bold Action. Secure Future., the Conservative Party manifesto
- Our Contract with You the 2024 Reform UK manifesto
