= List of Labour Party (UK) general election manifestos =

This is a list of the British Labour Party general election manifestos since the nascent party first fielded candidates at the 1900 general election.

From its foundation, general election manifestos were issued for the Labour Party as a whole, whereas the manifestos of the Conservative and Liberal parties generally took the form of a form of a short personal address by the leader of the party until the 1950s.

Labour wins a majority.
Labour wins the most seats without an absolute majority.

Election	Leader	Election winner	Manifesto title	Link to text
2024	Keir Starmer	Labour	Change	
2019	Jeremy Corbyn	Conservative	It's Time for Real Change	
2017	Jeremy Corbyn	Hung (Conservative with DUP confidence & supply)	For the Many, Not the Few	
2015	Ed Miliband	Conservative	Britain Can Be Better	
2010	Gordon Brown	Hung (Conservative-led coalition)	A Future Fair for All	
2005	Tony Blair	Labour	Britain Forward, Not Back	
2001	Tony Blair	Labour	Ambitions for Britain	
1997	Tony Blair	Labour	New Labour: Because Britain Deserves Better	
1992	Neil Kinnock	Conservative	It's Time to Get Britain Working Again	
1987	Neil Kinnock	Conservative	Britain Will Win with Labour	
1983	Michael Foot	Conservative	The New Hope for Britain	
1979	James Callaghan	Conservative	The Labour Way Is the Better Way	
October 1974	Harold Wilson	Labour	Britain Will Win with Labour	
February 1974	Harold Wilson	Hung (Labour)	Let Us Work Together – Labour's Way Out of the Crisis	
1970	Harold Wilson	Conservative	Now Britain's Strong – Let's Make It Great to Live In	
1966	Harold Wilson	Labour	Time for Decision	
1964	Harold Wilson	Labour	The New Britain	
1959	Hugh Gaitskell	Conservative	Britain Belongs to You	
1955	Clement Attlee	Conservative	Forward with Labour	
1951	Clement Attlee	Conservative	Labour Party Election Manifesto	
1950	Clement Attlee	Labour	Let Us Win Through Together	
1945	Clement Attlee	Labour	Let Us Face the Future	
1935	Clement Attlee	National Government	The Labour Party's Call to Power	
1931	Arthur Henderson	National Government	Labour's Call to Action	
1929	Ramsay MacDonald	Hung (Labour)	Labour's Appeal to the Nation	
1924	Ramsay MacDonald	Conservative	Labour's Appeal to the People	
1923	Ramsay MacDonald	Hung (Labour)	Labour's Appeal to the Nation	
1922	J. R. Clynes	Conservative	Labour's Call to the People	
1918	William Adamson	War Coalition	Labour's Call to the People	
December 1910	George Barnes	Hung (Liberal with Irish Nationalist support)	December 1910 Labour Party General Election Manifesto	
January 1910	Arthur Henderson	Hung (Liberal with Irish Nationalist support)	January 1910 Labour Party General Election Manifesto	
1906	Keir Hardie	Liberal	1906 Labour Party General Election Manifesto	
1900		Conservative	1900 Labour Party General Election Manifesto	

== See also ==
- List of Conservative Party (UK) general election manifestos
- List of Liberal Party and Liberal Democrats (UK) general election manifestos
- New Labour, New Life for Britain
