= List of United Kingdom general elections =

In the United Kingdom, general elections (for the House of Commons) have occurred since the first in 1802. The members of the 1801–1802 Parliament had been elected to the former Parliament of Great Britain and Parliament of Ireland, before being co-opted to serve in the first Parliament of the United Kingdom, so that Parliament is not included in the table below. There have been 58 general elections held in the UK up to and including the 2024 general election.

The UK government announced that the voting age will be lowered from 18 to 16 ahead of the next general election, fulfilling a key pledge by the Labour Party elected in July 2024. The move is part of broader democratic reforms, including automatic voter registration, acceptance of bank cards as ID, and stricter rules on campaign financing to curb foreign interference. The changes aim to boost participation after the 2024 election saw a historic low turnout of 59.7% and must be approved by Parliament before implementation.

== Election results ==
Shares of the vote in general elections since 1832 received by Conservatives (Note: Including Tory (1832), Conservative (from 1835), Liberal Conservative (1847–1859), Liberal Unionist (1886–1910), National parties (1931–1945).) (blue), Liberals/Liberal Democrats (Note: Including Whig (to mid-19th century), Liberal (mid-19th century to 1979), National Liberal (1922), Independent Liberal (1931), SDP-Liberal Alliance (1983–1987) and Liberal Democrat (from 1992).) (orange), Labour (red) and others (grey)

In 1801, the right to vote in the United Kingdom was severely restricted. Universal suffrage, on an equal basis for men and women over the age of 21, was established in 1928. Before 1918, general elections did not occur on a single day and polling was spread over several weeks.

The majority figure given is for the difference between the number of MPs elected at the general election from the party (or parties) of the government, as opposed to all other parties (some of which may have been giving some support to the government, but were not participating in a coalition). The Speaker is excluded from the calculation. A negative majority means that there was a hung parliament (or minority government) following that election. For example, at the 1929 general election, Labour was 42 seats short of forming a majority, and so its majority is listed as −42. If the party in office changed the figure is re-calculated, but no allowance is made for seat changes after the general election (between general elections).

No attempt is made to define a majority before 1832, when the Reform Act disenfranchised the rotten boroughs; before then the Tory party had an undemocratically entrenched dominance. Particularly in the early part of the period, the complexity of factional alignments, with both the Whig and Tory traditions tending to have some members in government and others in opposition factions simultaneously, make it impossible to produce an objective majority figure. The figures between 1832 and about 1859 are approximate due to problems of defining what was a party in government, as the source provides figures for all Liberals rather than just the Whig component in what developed into the Liberal Party. The Whig and Peelite Prime Ministers in the table below are regarded as having the support of all Liberals.

== List of elections ==
=== 19th century ===
Election	No.	Dates	Prime Minister appointed by Monarch (during term)	Winning party	Government vote share	Seat majority	Seats	Monarch
1802 (MPs)	1st	5 July – 28 August 1802	Henry Addington	Tory	N/A	N/A	658	George III
1802 (MPs)	1st	5 July – 28 August 1802	(William Pitt the Younger) (Note: Died in office.)	Tory	N/A	N/A	658	George III
1806 (MPs)	2nd	29 October – 17 December 1806	The Lord Grenville	Whig	N/A	N/A	658	George III
1807 (MPs)	3rd	4 May – 9 June 1807	The Duke of Portland	Tory	N/A	N/A	658	George III
1807 (MPs)	3rd	4 May – 9 June 1807	(Spencer Perceval)	Tory	N/A	N/A	658	George III
1812 (MPs)	4th	5 October – 10 November 1812	The Earl of Liverpool	Tory	N/A	N/A	658	George III
1818 (MPs)	5th	17 June – 18 July 1818	The Earl of Liverpool	Tory	N/A	N/A	658	George III
1820 (MPs)	6th	6 March – 14 April 1820	The Earl of Liverpool	Tory	N/A	N/A	658	George IV
1826 (MPs)	7th	7 June – 12 July 1826	George Canning	Tory	N/A	N/A	658	George IV
1826 (MPs)	7th	7 June – 12 July 1826	(The Viscount Goderich)	Tory	N/A	N/A	658	George IV
1826 (MPs)	7th	7 June – 12 July 1826	(The Duke of Wellington)	Tory	N/A	N/A	658	George IV
1830 (MPs)	8th	29 July – 1 September 1830	The Duke of Wellington (Note: Was defeated on a motion to examine the accounts of the Civil List on 15 November 1830 and resigned the following day.)	Tory	N/A	N/A	658	William IV
1831 (MPs)	9th	28 April – 1 June 1831	The Earl Grey	Whig	N/A	135	658	William IV
1832 (MPs)	10th	10 December 1832 – 8 January 1833	The Earl Grey	Whig	67.0%	225	658	William IV
1832 (MPs)	10th	10 December 1832 – 8 January 1833	(The Viscount Melbourne) (Note: Was dismissed by William IV on 14 November 1834.)	Whig	67.0%	225	658	William IV
1832 (MPs)	10th	10 December 1832 – 8 January 1833	(The Duke of Wellington)	Conservative	29.2%	−308	658	William IV
1832 (MPs)	10th	10 December 1832 – 8 January 1833	(Sir Robert Peel)	Conservative	29.2%	−308	658	William IV
1835 (MPs)	11th	6 January – 6 February 1835	Sir Robert Peel (Note: Peel was defeated on a report about the Irish Church on 7 April 1835 and resigned the following day.)	Conservative	42.8%	−113	658	William IV
1835 (MPs)	11th	6 January – 6 February 1835	(The Viscount Melbourne)	Whig	57.2%	113	658	William IV
1837 (MPs)	12th	24 July – 18 August 1837	The Viscount Melbourne (Note: Defeated on a motion of no confidence on 4 June 1841 and advised the Queen to dissolve Parliament, which she did on 23 June.)	Whig	52.4%	29	658	Victoria
1841 (MPs)	13th	29 June – 22 July 1841	The Viscount Melbourne (Note: Ministry met the House of Commons, but was defeated on an amendment to the Address on 27 August 1841 and resigned on 30 August 1841.)	Whig	46.2%	N/A	658	Victoria
1841 (MPs)	13th	29 June – 22 July 1841	(Sir Robert Peel) (Note: Was defeated on an Irish Coercion Bill on 25 June 1846 and resigned on 29 June 1846.)	Conservative	51.6%	77	658	Victoria
1841 (MPs)	13th	29 June – 22 July 1841	(Lord John Russell)	Whig	46.2%	N/A	658	Victoria
1847 (MPs)	14th	29 July – 26 August 1847	Lord John Russell (Note: Was defeated on a militia bill on 20 February 1852 and resigned on 23 February.)	Whig	53.8%	−72	656	Victoria
1847 (MPs)	14th	29 July – 26 August 1847	(The Earl of Derby)	Conservative	42.6%	N/A	656	Victoria
1852 (MPs)	15th	7–31 July 1852	The Earl of Derby (Note: Was defeated on the Budget on 16 December 1852 and resigned on 19 December 1852.)	Conservative	41.9%	7	654	Victoria
1852 (MPs)	15th	7–31 July 1852	(The Earl of Aberdeen) (Note: Was defeated on a vote in favour of a select committee to enquire into alleged mismanagement during the Crimean War on 29 January 1855 and resigned the next day.)	Peelite	N/A	N/A	654	Victoria
1852 (MPs)	15th	7–31 July 1852	(The Viscount Palmerston)	Whig	57.9%	N/A	654	Victoria
1857 (MPs)	16th	27 March – 24 April 1857	The Viscount Palmerston (Note: Was defeated on a Bill, which made it a felony to plot in Britain to murder someone abroad, on 19 February 1858 and resigned on the same day.)	Whig	64.8%	100	654	Victoria
1857 (MPs)	16th	27 March – 24 April 1857	(The Earl of Derby)	Conservative	33.5%	N/A	654	Victoria
1859 (MPs)	17th	28 April – 18 May 1859	The Earl of Derby (Note: Ministry met the Commons, but was defeated on an amendment to the Address on 10 June 1859 and resigned on 11 June 1859.)	Conservative	34.2%	N/A	654	Victoria
1859 (MPs)	17th	28 April – 18 May 1859	(The Viscount Palmerston)	Liberal	65.8%	59	654	Victoria
1865 (MPs)	18th	11–24 July 1865	The Viscount Palmerston	Liberal	59.5%	81	658	Victoria
1865 (MPs)	18th	11–24 July 1865	(The Earl Russell) (Note: Was defeated on Parliamentary reform proposals on 18 June 1866 and resigned on 26 June 1866.)	Liberal	59.5%	N/A	658	Victoria
1865 (MPs)	18th	11–24 July 1865	(The Earl of Derby)	Conservative	40.5%	N/A	658	Victoria
1865 (MPs)	18th	11–24 July 1865	(Benjamin Disraeli)	Conservative	40.5%	N/A	658	Victoria
1868 (MPs)	19th	17 November – 7 December 1868	William Ewart Gladstone	Liberal	61.2%	115	658	Victoria
1874 (MPs)	20th	31 January – 17 February 1874	Benjamin Disraeli	Conservative	44.3%	49	652	Victoria
1880 (MPs)	21st	31 March – 27 April 1880	William Ewart Gladstone	Liberal	54.7%	51	652	Victoria
1880 (MPs)	21st	31 March – 27 April 1880	(The Marquess of Salisbury)	Conservative	42.5%	N/A	652	Victoria
1885 (MPs)	22nd	24 November – 18 December 1885	The Marquess of Salisbury	Conservative (Note: Hung parliament.)	43.0%	N/A	670	Victoria
1885 (MPs)	22nd	24 November – 18 December 1885	(William Ewart Gladstone)	Liberal	47.7%	−16	670	Victoria
1886 (MPs)	23rd	1–27 July 1886	The Marquess of Salisbury	Conservative & Liberal Unionists	51.4%	58	670	Victoria
1892 (MPs)	24th	4–26 July 1892	The Marquess of Salisbury	Conservative & Liberal Unionists	47.0%	N/A	670	Victoria
1892 (MPs)	24th	4–26 July 1892	(William Ewart Gladstone)	Liberal	45.4%	−126	670	Victoria
1892 (MPs)	24th	4–26 July 1892	(The Earl of Rosebery)	Liberal	45.4%	−126	670	Victoria
1892 (MPs)	24th	4–26 July 1892	(The Marquess of Salisbury) (Note: Immediately advised the dissolution of Parliament upon becoming Prime Minister.)	Conservative & Liberal Unionists	47.0%	N/A	670	Victoria
1895 (MPs)	25th	13 July – 7 August 1895	The Marquess of Salisbury	Conservative & Liberal Unionists	49.3%	153	670	Victoria
1900 (MPs)	26th	26 September – 24 October 1900 (Note: Known as a Khaki election which is an election heavily influenced by wartime or postwar sentiment.)	The Marquess of Salisbury	Conservative & Liberal Unionists	50.2%	135	670	Victoria
1900 (MPs)	26th	26 September – 24 October 1900	(Arthur Balfour)	Conservative & Liberal Unionists	50.2%	N/A	670	Victoria
1900 (MPs)	26th	26 September – 24 October 1900	(Sir Henry Campbell-Bannerman)	Liberal	45.1%	N/A	670	Victoria

=== 20th century ===
Election	No.	Date	Prime Minister appointed by Monarch (during term)	Winning party	Government vote share	Seat majority	Seats	Turnout	Monarch
1906 (MPs)	27th	12 January – 8 February 1906	Sir Henry Campbell-Bannerman	Liberal	48.9%	124	670	N/A	Edward VII
1906 (MPs)	27th	12 January – 8 February 1906	(H. H. Asquith)	Liberal	48.9%	124	670	N/A	Edward VII
1910 (MPs)	28th	15 January – 10 February 1910	H. H. Asquith	Liberal (minority government) (Note: Hung parliament.)	43.5%	−122	670	N/A	Edward VII
1910 (MPs)	29th	3–19 December 1910	H. H. Asquith	Liberal (minority government)	44.2%	−126	670	N/A	George V
1910 (MPs)	29th	3–19 December 1910	(David Lloyd George)	Liberal (minority government)	44.2%	−126	670	N/A	George V
The election that would have been due by 1916 as a result of the Parliament Act 1911 was not held due to the First World War (1914–1918).									George V
1918 (MPs)	30th	14 December 1918	David Lloyd George	Liberal (coalition) (Note: Coalition Coupon. The Conservative party (led by Bonar Law) won the most votes and seats, but David Lloyd George became Prime Minister as leader of the Liberal party as part of a major cross-party deal.)	53.0%	238	707	57.2%	George V
1918 (MPs)	30th	14 December 1918	(Bonar Law) (Note: Bonar Law immediately advised the dissolution of Parliament upon becoming Prime Minister on 23 October 1922.)	Conservative	53.0%	238	707	57.2%	George V
1922 (MPs)	31st	15 November 1922	Bonar Law	Conservative	38.5%	74	615	73.0%	George V
1922 (MPs)	31st	15 November 1922	(Stanley Baldwin)	Conservative	38.5%	74	615	73.0%	George V
1923 (MPs)	32nd	6 December 1923	Stanley Baldwin	Conservative (minority government)	N/A	N/A	615	71.1%	George V
1923 (MPs)	32nd	6 December 1923	(Ramsay MacDonald)	Labour (minority government)	30.7%	−98	615	71.1%	George V
1924 (MPs)	33rd	29 October 1924	Stanley Baldwin	Conservative	46.8%	210	615	77.0%	George V
1929 (MPs)	34th	30 May 1929 (Note: Known as the 'flapper' election because it was the first election in which women aged 21–29 had the right to vote.)	Ramsay MacDonald	Labour (minority government)	37.1%	−42	615	76.3%	George V
1931 (MPs)	35th	27 October 1931	Ramsay MacDonald	National Labour (National Government)	67.2%	492	615	76.4%	George V
1935 (MPs)	36th	14 November 1935	Stanley Baldwin	Conservative (National Government)	51.8%	242	615	71.1%	George V
1935 (MPs)	36th	14 November 1935	(Neville Chamberlain)	Conservative (National Government)	51.8%	242	615	71.1%	George VI
1935 (MPs)	36th	14 November 1935	(Winston Churchill)	Conservative (war-time coalition)	97.7%	609	615	71.1%	George VI
1935 (MPs)	36th	14 November 1935	(Winston Churchill)	Conservative (caretaker government)	51.8%	242	615	71.1%	George VI
The election due by 1940 was not held due to the Second World War (1939–1945).									George VI
1945 (MPs)	37th	5 July 1945	Clement Attlee	Labour	47.7%	146	640	72.8%	George VI
1950 (MPs)	38th	23 February 1950	Clement Attlee	Labour	46.1%	5	625	83.9%	George VI
1951 (MPs)	39th	25 October 1951	Sir Winston Churchill	Conservative	48.0% (Note: In the 1951 general election, although the Labour Party won a plurality of votes (48.8%), it was the Conservative Party with 48% of the voteshare that won a 17-seat majority and would go on to form the next government.)	17	625	82.6%	George VI
1951 (MPs)	39th	25 October 1951	(Sir Anthony Eden)	Conservative	48.0%	17	625	82.6%	Elizabeth II
1955 (MPs)	40th	26 May 1955	Anthony Eden	Conservative	49.7%	60	630	76.8%	Elizabeth II
1955 (MPs)	40th	26 May 1955	(Harold Macmillan)	Conservative	49.7%	60	630	76.8%	Elizabeth II
1959 (MPs)	41st	8 October 1959	Harold Macmillan	Conservative	49.4%	100	630	78.7%	Elizabeth II
1959 (MPs)	41st	8 October 1959	(Alec Douglas-Home)	Conservative	49.4%	100	630	78.7%	Elizabeth II
1964 (MPs)	42nd	15 October 1964	Harold Wilson	Labour	44.1%	4	630	77.1%	Elizabeth II
1966 (MPs)	43rd	31 March 1966	Harold Wilson	Labour	48.0%	98	630	75.8%	Elizabeth II
1970 (MPs)	44th	18 June 1970	Edward Heath	Conservative	46.4%	30	630	72.0%	Elizabeth II
1974 (MPs)	45th	28 February 1974	Harold Wilson	Labour (minority government)	37.2%	−33	630	78.8%	Elizabeth II
1974 (MPs)	46th	10 October 1974	Harold Wilson	Labour	39.2%	3	635	72.8%	Elizabeth II
1974 (MPs)	46th	10 October 1974	(James Callaghan)	Labour	39.2%	3	635	72.8%	Elizabeth II
1979 (MPs)	47th	3 May 1979	Margaret Thatcher	Conservative	43.9%	43	635	76.0%	Elizabeth II
1983 (MPs)	48th	9 June 1983	Margaret Thatcher	Conservative	42.4%	144	650	72.7%	Elizabeth II
1987 (MPs)	49th	11 June 1987	Margaret Thatcher	Conservative	42.2%	102	650	75.3%	Elizabeth II
1987 (MPs)	49th	11 June 1987	(John Major)	Conservative	42.2%	102	650	75.3%	Elizabeth II
1992 (MPs)	50th	9 April 1992	John Major	Conservative	41.9%	21	651	77.7%	Elizabeth II
1997 (MPs)	51st	1 May 1997	Tony Blair	Labour	43.2%	179	659	71.4%	Elizabeth II

=== 21st century ===
Election	No.	Date	Prime Minister appointed by Monarch (during term)	Winning party	Government vote share	Seat majority	Seats	Turnout	Monarch
2001 (MPs)	52nd	7 June 2001	Tony Blair	Labour	40.7%	167	659	59.4%	Elizabeth II
2005 (MPs)	53rd	5 May 2005	Tony Blair	Labour	35.2%	66	646	61.4%	Elizabeth II
2005 (MPs)	53rd	5 May 2005	(Gordon Brown) (Note: Brown succeeded Blair as Prime Minister on 27 June 2007 – three days after being elected (without opposition) leader of the Labour party in a party leadership election.)	Labour	35.2%	66	646	61.4%	Elizabeth II
2010 (MPs)	54th	6 May 2010	David Cameron	Conservative (coalition) (Note: Hung parliament. Formed a coalition with the Liberal Democrats, led by Nick Clegg (who became Deputy Prime Minister).)	59.1% (Note: Includes the vote share of both the Conservatives (36.1%) and Liberal Democrats (23%).)	78 (Note: Combined coalition total.)	650	65.1%	Elizabeth II
2015 (MPs)	55th	7 May 2015	David Cameron	Conservative	36.8%	12	650	66.1%	Elizabeth II
2015 (MPs)	55th	7 May 2015	(Theresa May) (Note: May succeeded Cameron as Prime Minister on 13 July 2016, following a short party leadership election.)	Conservative	36.8%	12	650	66.1%	Elizabeth II
2017 (MPs)	56th	8 June 2017	Theresa May	Conservative (confidence and supply government) (Note: Hung parliament.)	42.3%	−5 (Note: Confidence and supply agreement with the Democratic Unionist Party.)	650	68.8%	Elizabeth II
2017 (MPs)	56th	8 June 2017	(Boris Johnson) (Note: Johnson succeeded May as Prime Minister on 24 July 2019 – two days after being elected leader of the Conservative Party in a party leadership election.)	Conservative (confidence and supply government)	42.3%	−5	650	68.8%	Elizabeth II
2019 (MPs)	57th	12 December 2019	Boris Johnson	Conservative	43.6%	80	650	67.3%	Elizabeth II
2019 (MPs)	57th	12 December 2019	(Liz Truss) (Note: Truss succeeded Johnson as Prime Minister on 6 September 2022 – the day after being elected leader of the Conservative Party in the July–September party leadership election.)	Conservative	43.6%	80	650	67.3%	Elizabeth II
2019 (MPs)	57th	12 December 2019	(Rishi Sunak) (Note: Sunak succeeded Truss as Prime Minister on 25 October 2022 – the day after being elected (without opposition) leader of the Conservative Party in the October party leadership election.)	Conservative	43.6%	80	650	67.3%	Charles III
2024 (MPs)	58th	4 July 2024	Sir Keir Starmer	Labour	33.7%	174	650	59.9%	Charles III
2024 (MPs)	58th	4 July 2024	(Andy Burnham) (Note: Burnham succeeded Starmer as Prime Minister on 20 July 2026 – three days after being elected (without opposition) leader of the Labour party in a party leadership election.)	Labour	33.7%	174	650	59.9%	Charles III

== See also ==
- List of Conservative Party (UK) general election manifestos
- List of Labour Party (UK) general election manifestos
- List of Liberal Party and Liberal Democrats (UK) general election manifestos
- Referendums in the United Kingdom
