= List of Conservative Party (UK) general election manifestos =

This is a list of the British Conservative Party general election manifestos since 1900. From 1900 to 1945, the Conservative Party general election manifesto was usually published as a form of a short personal address by the leader of the party. From 1950 the party published a more formal document.

Conservatives win a majority.
Conservatives win the most seats without an absolute majority.

Election	Leader	Election winner	Manifesto title	Link to text
2024	Rishi Sunak	Labour	Clear Plan. Bold Action. Secure Future.	
2019	Boris Johnson	Conservative	Get Brexit Done: Unleash Britain's Potential	
2017	Theresa May	Hung (Conservative with DUP confidence & supply)	Forward, Together: Our Plan for a Stronger Britain and a Prosperous Future	
2015	David Cameron	Conservative	Strong Leadership. A Clear Economic Plan. A Brighter, More Secure Future.	
2010	David Cameron	Hung (Conservative-led coalition)	Invitation to Join the Government of Britain	
2005	Michael Howard	Labour	Are You Thinking What We're Thinking?	
2001	William Hague	Labour	Time for Common Sense	
1997	John Major	Labour	You Can Only Be Sure with the Conservatives	
1992	John Major	Conservative	The Best Future for Britain	
1987	Margaret Thatcher	Conservative	The Next Moves Forward	
1983	Margaret Thatcher	Conservative	The Challenge of Our Times	
1979	Margaret Thatcher	Conservative	1979 Conservative Party General Election Manifesto	
October 1974	Edward Heath	Labour	Putting Britain First	
February 1974	Edward Heath	Hung (Labour)	Firm Action for a Fair Britain	
1970	Edward Heath	Conservative	A Better Tomorrow	
1966	Edward Heath	Labour	Action Not Words: The New Conservative Programme	
1964	Alec Douglas-Home	Labour	Prosperity with a Purpose	
1959	Harold Macmillan	Conservative	The Next Five Years	
1955	Anthony Eden	Conservative	United for Peace and Progress	
1951	Winston Churchill	Conservative	1951 Conservative Party General Election Manifesto	
1950	Winston Churchill	Labour	This Is the Road	
1945	Winston Churchill	Labour	Winston Churchill's Declaration of Policy to the Electors	
1935	Stanley Baldwin	National Government	A Call to the Nation	
1931	Stanley Baldwin	National Government	The Nation's Duty	
1929	Stanley Baldwin	Hung (Labour)	Stanley Baldwin's Election Address	
1924	Stanley Baldwin	Conservative	Stanley Baldwin's Election Address	
1923	Stanley Baldwin	Hung (Labour)	Stanley Baldwin's Election Address	
1922	Bonar Law	Conservative	Andrew Bonar Law's Election Address	
1918	Bonar Law	Hung (Conservative-dominated coalition)	The Manifesto of Lloyd George and Bonar Law	
December 1910	Arthur Balfour	Hung (Liberal with Irish Nationalist support)	Arthur Balfour's Election Address	
January 1910	Arthur Balfour	Hung (Liberal with Irish Nationalist support)	Arthur Balfour's Election Address	
1906	Arthur Balfour	Liberal	Arthur Balfour's Election Address	
1900	Lord Salisbury	Conservative	The Manifesto of the Marquess of Salisbury	

== See also ==
- Tamworth Manifesto
- List of Labour Party (UK) general election manifestos
- List of Liberal Party and Liberal Democrats (UK) general election manifestos
- Our Society, Your Life
