= List of Liberal Party and Liberal Democrats (UK) general election manifestos =

This is a list of the British Liberal Party, SDP–Liberal Alliance, and Liberal Democrats general election manifestos since the 1900 general election.

From 1900 to 1918, the Liberal general election manifesto was usually published as a form of a short personal address by the leader of the Party. From 1922, the party usually published a more formal document.

From the 1900 election to the 1979 election the party went to the polls as the Liberal Party. In 1983 and 1987, the party went to the polls under the banner of the "Alliance", as a result of the pact between the Liberals and the Social Democratic Party, the latter of which formed as a breakaway from Labour in 1981. Since 1992 it has competed as the Liberal Democrats, due to the merger of the Liberals and the SDP in 1988.

From 2010 to 2015, the Liberal Democrats, having signed an agreement with the Conservatives, served as junior partner in the first coalition government since the Second World War.

Liberals win a majority.
Liberals win the most seats without an absolute majority.

Election	Leader	Election winner	Manifesto title	Link to text
2024	Ed Davey	Labour	For a Fair Deal	
2019	Jo Swinson	Conservative	Stop Brexit, Build a Brighter Future	
2017	Tim Farron	Hung (Conservative)	Change Britain's Future	
2015	Nick Clegg	Conservative	Stronger Economy. Fairer Society. Opportunity for Everyone.	
2010	Nick Clegg	Hung (Conservative-led coalition)	Change That Works for You	
2005	Charles Kennedy	Labour	The Real Alternative	
2001	Charles Kennedy	Labour	Freedom, Justice, Honesty	
1997	Paddy Ashdown	Labour	Make the Difference	
1992	Paddy Ashdown	Conservative	Changing Britain for Good	
1987	David Steel	Conservative	Britain United – The Time Has Come	
1987	David Owen	Conservative	Britain United – The Time Has Come	
1983	David Steel	Conservative	Working Together for Britain	
1983	Roy Jenkins	Conservative	Working Together for Britain	
1979	David Steel	Conservative	The Real Fight Is for Britain	
October 1974	Jeremy Thorpe	Labour	Why Britain Needs Liberal Government	
February 1974	Jeremy Thorpe	Hung (Labour)	Change the Face of Britain	
1970	Jeremy Thorpe	Conservative	What a Life!	
1966	Jo Grimond	Labour	For All the People: The Liberal Plan of 1966	
1964	Jo Grimond	Labour	Think for Yourself	
1959	Jo Grimond	Conservative	People Count	
1955	Clement Davies	Conservative	Crisis Unresolved	
1951	Clement Davies	Conservative	The Nation's Task	
1950	Clement Davies	Labour	No Easy Way: Britain's Problems and the Liberal Answers	
1945	Archibald Sinclair	Labour	20 Point Manifesto of the Liberal Party	
1935	Herbert Samuel	National Government	1935 Liberal Party General Election Manifesto	
1931	Herbert Samuel	National Government	Liberal Address to the Nation	
1929	David Lloyd George	Hung (Labour)	David Lloyd George's Election Address	
1924	H. H. Asquith	Conservative	The Liberal Manifesto	
1923	H. H. Asquith	Hung (Labour)	A Call to the Nation	
1922	H. H. Asquith	Conservative	Manifesto to the Nation	
1918	H. H. Asquith	Hung (Conservative-dominated coalition)	Herbert Asquith's Election Address	
December 1910	H. H. Asquith	Hung (Liberal with Irish Nationalist support)	Herbert Asquith's Election Address	
January 1910	H. H. Asquith	Hung (Liberal with Irish Nationalist support)	Herbert Asquith's Election Address	
1906	Henry Campbell-Bannerman	Liberal	Henry Campbell-Bannerman's Election Address	
1900	Henry Campbell-Bannerman	Conservative	Manifesto of the National Liberal Federation	

== See also ==
- List of Conservative Party (UK) general election manifestos
- List of Labour Party (UK) general election manifestos
