= Political platform =

Formal set of principal goals supported by a political party or candidate

A political party platform (North American English), party program, or party manifesto (preferential term in British and often Commonwealth English) is a formal set of principal goals which are supported by a political party or individual candidate, to appeal to the general public, for the ultimate purpose of garnering the general public's support and votes about complicated topics or issues. A component of a political platform is often called a plank – the opinions and viewpoints about an individual topic, as held by a party, person, or organization. The word "plank" depicts a component of an overall political platform, as a metaphorical reference to a basic stage made of boards or planks of wood. The metaphor can return to its literal origin when public speaking or debates are actually held upon a physical platform.

In the United Kingdom and certain other countries, the party platform is referred to as the party's "manifesto" or political programme. The manifesto contains election pledges, or election promises. Across the Western world, political parties in power are highly likely to fulfill their election promises, though some goals may fail to be achivied due constitutional checks and balances, gridlock, crisis events, or changes in the economic and global reality during a politician's or political party's term in office.

== Origins ==
The first known use of the word platform was in 1535. The word platform comes from Middle French plate-forme, literally meaning "flat form". The political meaning of the word to reflect "statement of party politics" is from 1803, probably originally an image of a literal platform on which politicians gather, stand, and make their appeals.

== Fulfilling platforms ==
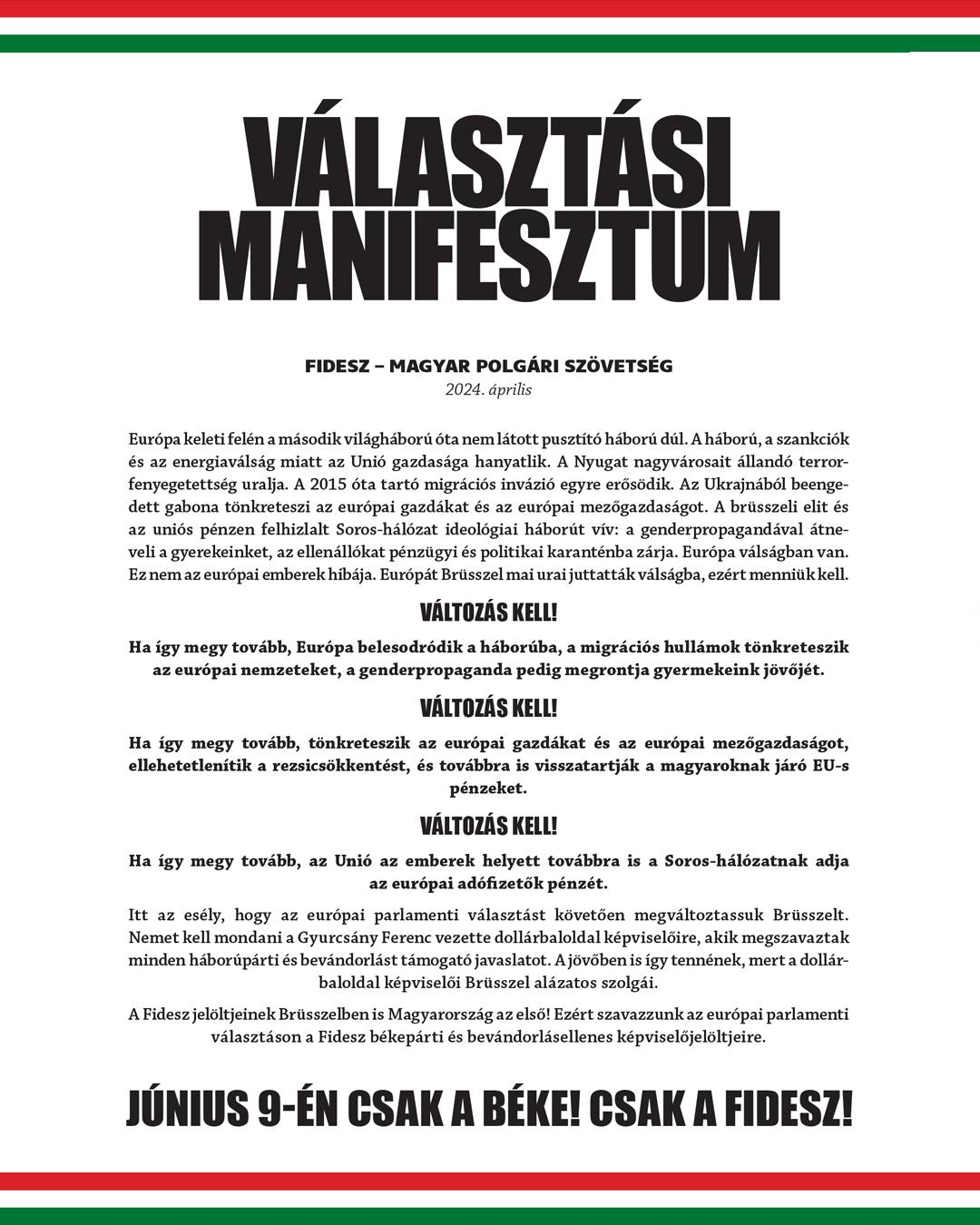
Fidesz party manifesto – Hungary, 2024

A 2017 study in the American Journal of Political Science that analyzed 12 countries (Austria, Bulgaria, Canada, Germany, Ireland, Italy, the Netherlands, Portugal, Spain, Sweden, United Kingdom, and United States) found that political parties in government fulfill their election promises to voters to a considerable extent. The study determined that:

Parties that hold executive office after elections generally fulfill substantial percentages, sometimes very high percentages, of their election pledges, whereas parties that do not hold executive office generally find that lower percentages of their pledges are fulfilled. The fulfillment of pledges by governing executive parties varies across governments in ways that reflect power-sharing arrangements. The main power-sharing arrangement that impacts pledge fulfillment distinguishes between single-party governments and coalitions, not between governments with and without legislative majorities. We found the highest percentages of pledge fulfillment for governing parties in the United Kingdom, Sweden, Portugal, Spain, and Canada, most of which governed in single-party executives. We found lower percentages for governing parties in Germany, the Netherlands, Austria, Bulgaria, Ireland, and Italy, most of which governed in coalitions. Pledge fulfillment by U.S. presidential parties lies at the higher end of coalition governments, which suggests that U.S. presidents are more constrained than governing parties in single-party parliamentary systems, but less constrained than most governing parties in multiparty coalitions.

Other research on the United States suggests that Democratic Party and Republican Party congresspeople voted in line with their respective party platforms 74 per cent and 89 per cent of the time, respectively.

== Famous political platforms ==
- The Ninety-Five Theses of Martin Luther in 1517, opposed practices of the Catholic Church at that time (both a religion and a political territory), and led to the establishment of Protestantism
- Thomas Paine's pamphlet Common Sense (1776) advocated freedom from the rule of Great Britain for the American Colonists and proposed a constitution for the new United States
- The Federalist under "Publius", the collective pseudonym of Alexander Hamilton, James Madison, and John Jay
- Tamworth Manifesto in 1834, a political manifesto issued by Sir Robert Peel, 2nd Baronet, in a run-up to the British general election of 1835 that laid down the principles upon which the modern Conservative Party was founded from the old Tory party.
- Friedrich Engels and Karl Marx's 1848 Communist Manifesto, called for the abolition of private property and applied a scientific understanding to the development of society through socialism into a society without money-usage, social classes, or state coercion, which would be called "communism"
- The 1875 Gotha Program of the recently united Social Democratic Party of Germany, subject to a famous critique by Karl Marx
- Erfurt Program of the Social Democratic Party of Germany in 1891
- Bolshevism of the Russian Social Democratic Labour Party (1916)
- Franklin Roosevelt's 1932 New Deal
- The 1948 United States Democratic Party's platform including civil rights
- John F. Kennedy's 1960 New Frontier
- Lyndon Baines Johnson's Great Society, 1964
- The 1993 Liberal Party of Canada Red Book
- The 1994 Republican congressional Contract with America
- Mike Harris's 1995 Common Sense Revolution
- 100-Hour Plan of the United States Democratic Party in 2006
- Clause IV Socialism, a focus of debate in the UK Labour Party
- The Heritage Foundation 2024 Project 2025

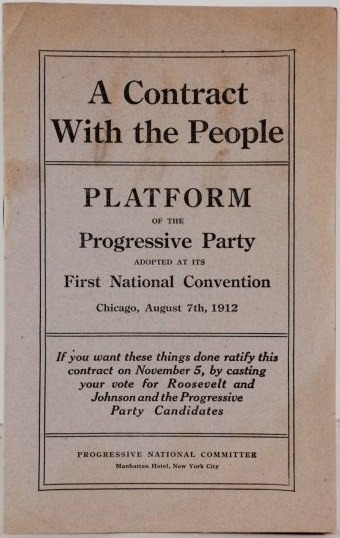
Example of a printed platform in pamphlet form the 1912 U.S. Progressive Party platform

== See also ==
- List of democracy and elections-related topics
- List of Conservative Party (UK) general election manifestos
- List of Labour Party (UK) general election manifestos
- List of Liberal Party and Liberal Democrats (UK) general election manifestos
- Mandate (politics)
- Party line (politics)
- Stump speech (politics)
