= Meg =

Name list

Meg is a feminine given name, often a short form of other names such as Megan and Margaret. It may refer to:

== People ==
- Meg (singer) (born 1980), Japanese singer
- Meg Baird, American musician
- Meg Bateman, Scottish writer
- Meg Bellamy, British actress
- Meg Bennett (1948–2024), American screenwriter and actress
- Meg Beresford (born 1937), British campaigner against nuclear weapons and activist
- Meg Brown, Australian politician
- Meg Bussert (born 1949), American opera singer
- Meg Cabot (born 1967), American author of romantic and paranormal fiction
- Meg Burton Cahill (born 1954), American politician and former Arizona state senator
- Meg Campbell (1937–2007), New Zealand poet
- Meg Charlton, American writer
- Meg Christian (born 1946), American folk musician
- Meg Connery (1881–1958), suffragist organizer and activist
- Meg Cranston (born 1960), American artist
- Meg Crofton, American businesswoman
- Meg Daly, American evolutionary biologist
- Meg Davis, American singer of traditional music
- Meg DeLacy (born 1996), American actress and singer
- Meg Donnelly (born 2000), American actress
- Meg Downie (born 1989), Australian rules footballer
- Meg Duffy, American musician
- Meg Elis (born 1950), Welsh writer, translator and language activist
- Meg Elison (born 1982), American author and feminist essayist
- Meg Emmerich (born 1986), Brazilian para judoka
- Meg Farquhar (1910–1988), British professional golfer
- Meg Foster (born 1948), American actress
- Meg Frampton (born 1985), guitarist and back-up singer for the band Meg & Dia
- Meg Froelich, American politician from Colorado
- Meg Gaillard, American yacht racer
- Meg Gallagher (1950–2000), American actress
- Meg Gardiner (born 1957), American novelist
- Meg Greenfield (1930–1999), American Pulitzer Prize-winning editorial writer and columnist
- Meg Griffin (born 1953), American radio disc jockey
- Meg Griffiths, American photographer
- Meg Harding, American politician
- Meg Harris (born 2002), Australian swimmer
- Meg Hemphill (born 1996), Japanese track and field athlete
- Meg Hillier (born 1969), British Labour Co-op politician
- Meg Hughes, American soccer player
- Meg Hutchins (born 1982), Australian rules footballer
- Meg Hutchinson (born 1978), American folk singer-songwriter
- Meg Imperial (born 1993), Filipino actress
- Meg Jackson, American screenwriter
- Meg Jacobs, American historian
- Meg Jayanth (born 1987), British video game writer
- Meg Johnson (disambiguation), several people
- Meg Kelly, American television soap opera screenwriter
- Meg Kendal (born 1989), Irish cricketer
- Meg Kissinger, American investigative reporter
- Meg Lanning (born 1992), Australian cricketer
- Meg Lee Chin (born 1960), Taiwanese-American singer-songwriter, best known as a member of the group Pigface
- Meg Lees (born 1948), Australian politician
- Meg LeFauve (born 1969), American screenwriter (co-nominated for the Academy Award for Inside Out) and producer
- Meg Lees (born 1948), Australian politician
- Meg Lemon (born 1989), Australian Paralympic cyclist
- Meg Lemonnier (1905–1998), British-born French actress
- Meg Leonard, British screenwriter, producer and director
- Meg Loughran Cappel, American politician
- Meg Luger-Nikolai, American politician
- Meg Mac, Australian musical artist
- Meg Macdonald, Australian rules footballer
- Meg Mallon (born 1963), American LPGA golfer
- Meg Mason, American author
- Meg McCall (1931–1997), Canadian politician
- Meg McDonald (born 1991), Australian rules footballer
- Meg McKinlay, Australian children’s writer
- Meg McLaughlin (born 1995), Australian soccer player
- Meg Medina (born 1963), American children’s writer
- Meg Meeker (born 1957), American pediatrician and author
- Meg Miners (born 1944), Rhodesian swimmer
- Meg Miroshnik, American playwright
- Meg Morris (born 1992), American National Women's Soccer League player
- Meg Mundy (1915–2016), American actress
- Meg Munn (born 1959), British Labour Co-op politician
- Meg Muñoz, advocate for sex workers
- Meg Myers (born 1986), American musician
- Meg Myles (1934–2019), American pin-up model, singer and actress
- Meg Okura (born 1973), Japanese musician
- Meg Oliver (born 1970), American journalist
- Meg Onli (born 1983), American curator
- Meg Otanwa, Nigerian actress
- Meg Patterson (1922–2002), Scottish surgeon
- Meg Pearce, Australian field hockey player
- Meg Phillips (born 1996), Australian cricketer
- Meg Scott Phipps, American politician
- Meg Randall (1926–2018), American actress
- Meg Ritchie (born 1952), Scottish discus thrower and shot putter
- Meg Rosoff (born 1956), American novelist
- Meg Russell, British political scientist
- Meg Ryan (born 1961), American actress
- Meg Saligman, American artist
- Meg Smaker, American filmmaker
- Meg Sneed (born 1982), American activist
- Meg Steedle, American actress
- Meg Stuart (born 1965), American choreographer and dancer
- Meg Taylor, Papua New Guinean politician
- Meg Thalken (born 1954), American actress
- Meg Tilly (born 1960), Canadian-American actress, born Margaret Elizabeth Chan
- Meg Turney (born 1987), American YouTube personality
- Meg Twycross, UK historian and medievalist
- Meg Urry, American astrophysicist
- Meg Wade (born 1961), Australian equestrian
- Meg Waite Clayton (born 1959), American novelist
- Meg Ward (DJ), British disc jockey and record producer
- Meg Ward (born 1994), Australian international rugby league footballer
- Meg Webb (born 1974), Australian politician and community sector worker
- Meg Webster, American artist
- Meg Westergren (born 1932), Swedish actress
- Meg White (born 1974), American drummer, half of the rock duo The White Stripes (with former husband Jack White)
- Meg Whitman (born 1956), former CEO of eBay and California gubernatorial candidate
- Meg Wittner (born 1950), American actress
- Meg Wolitzer (born 1959), American author
- Meg Woolf (1923–2023), British artist
- Meg Wyllie (1917–2002), American actress
- Meg Wynn Owen (1939–2022), British actress
- Long Meg of Westminster (16th-century) English tavern keeper
- Margarete Pioresan, known as Meg (born 1956), Brazilian football goalkeeper
- Meg (Maria Di Donna), Italian singer and former member of band 99 Posse and duo Nous

== Fictional characters ==
- The Meg, the titlular megalodon shark in:
  - the 1997 novel series Meg: A Novel of Deep Terror
  - the 2018 action film The Meg
- Meg Griffin, one of the main characters on the animated television show Family Guy
- Margaret March, in Louisa May Alcott's novels Little Women, Little Men and Jo's Boys
- Meg Masters, on the television show Supernatural
- Meg Murry, in Madeleine L'Engle's Time Quintet novels
- Meg Snyder, on the American soap opera As the World Turns
- Meg!, a comic strip
- Meg (Hercules)
- Meg, a minor character in Xena: Warrior Princess
- Margaret "Meg" McCaffrey, a supporting character in The Trials of Apollo by Rick Riordan
- Meg Kataoka (片岡 メグ), a character from the Assassination Classroom manga and anime series
- Meg and Mog, a series of children's books about a witch and a cat
- Meg, a brawler from the mobile game Brawl Stars
