= 2019 United Kingdom general election =

- 12 December 2019

All 650 seats in the House of Commons 326 (Note: Given that Sinn Féin members of Parliament (MPs) practise abstentionism and do not take their seats, while the Speaker and deputies do not vote, the number of MPs needed for a majority is in practice slightly lower. Sinn Féin won 7 seats, meaning that a practical majority required 322 MPs.) seats needed for a majority
- Opinion polls
- Registered: 47,562,702
- Turnout: 32,014,110; 67.3% (▼1.5 pp)
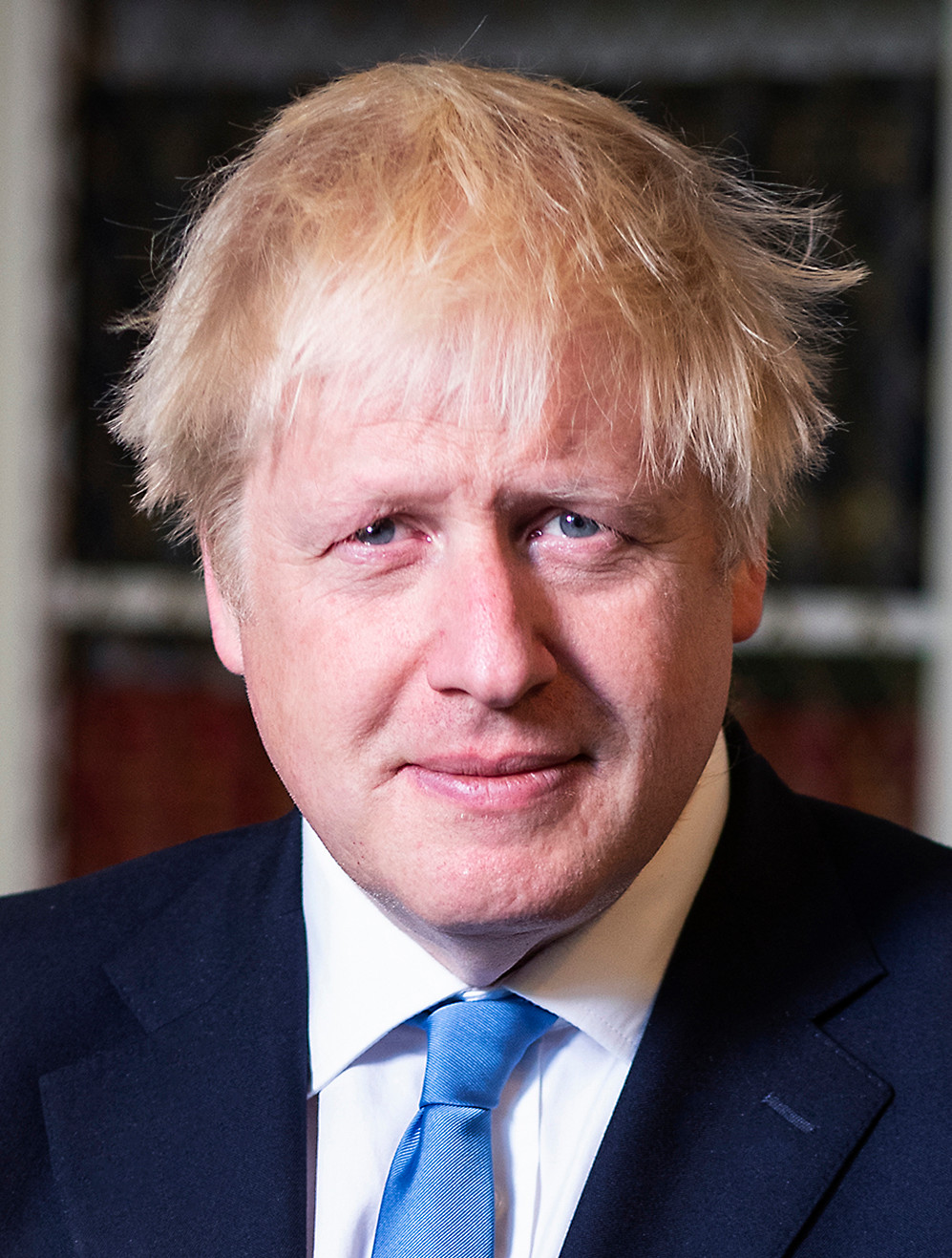

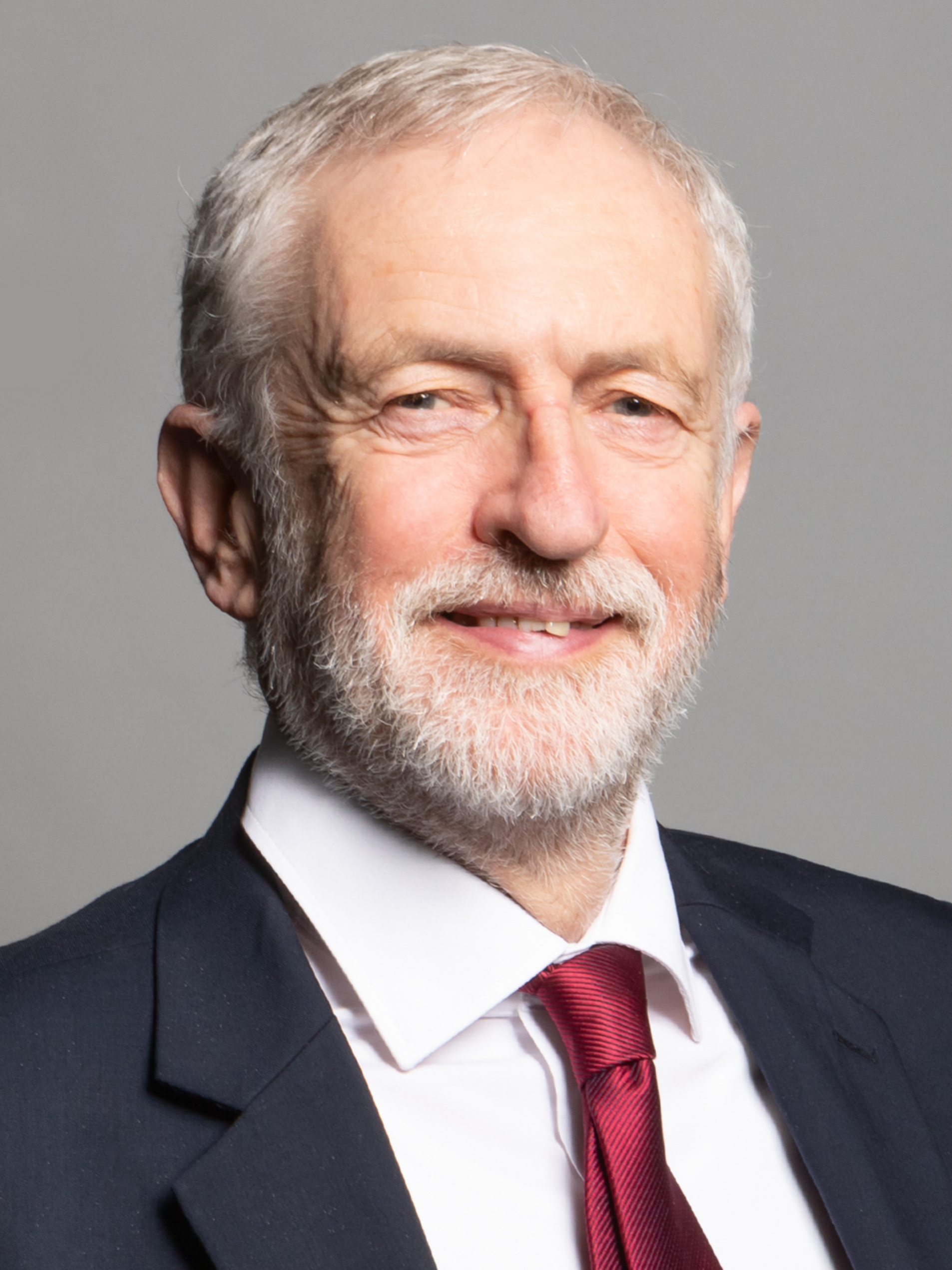

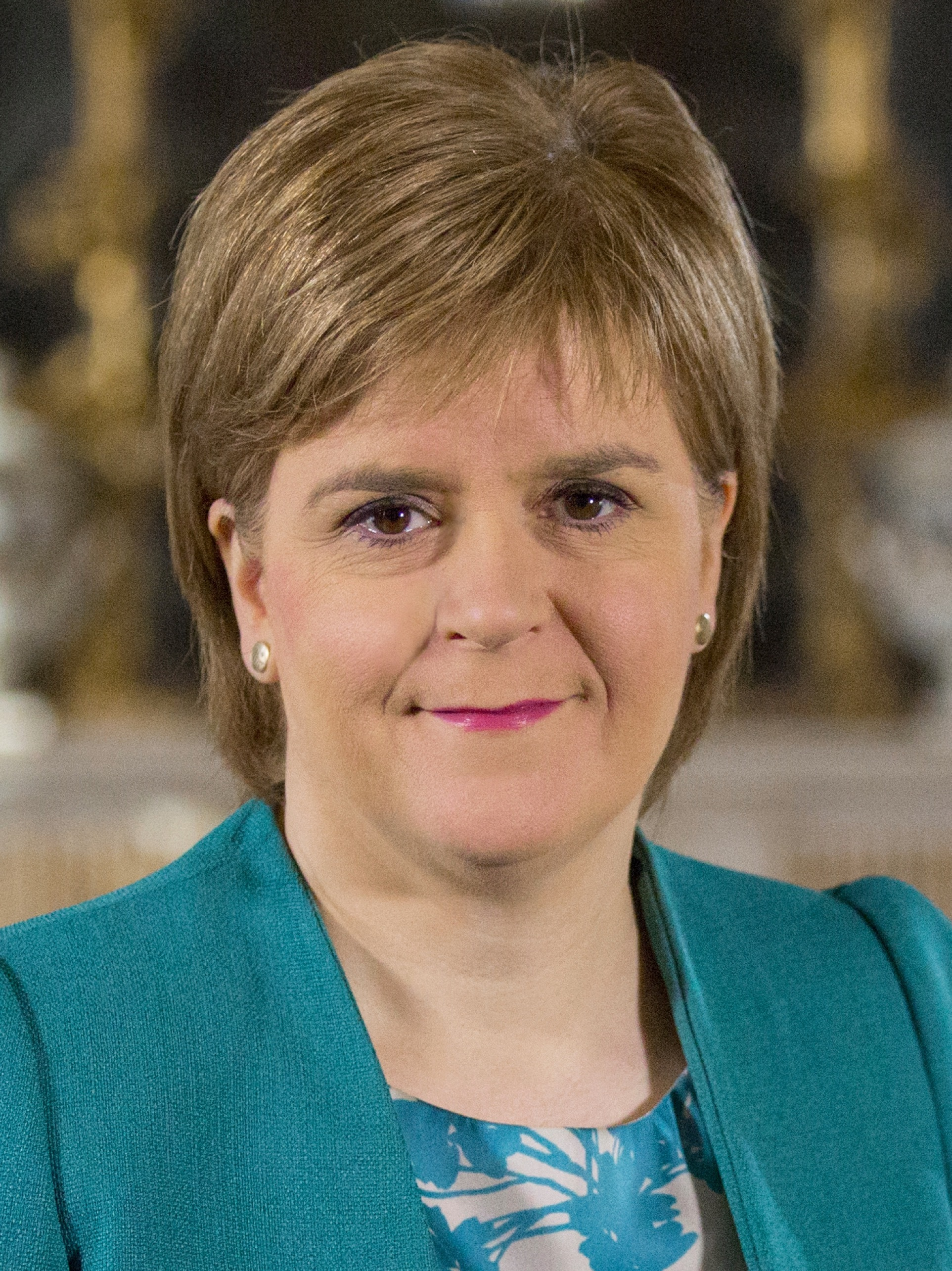

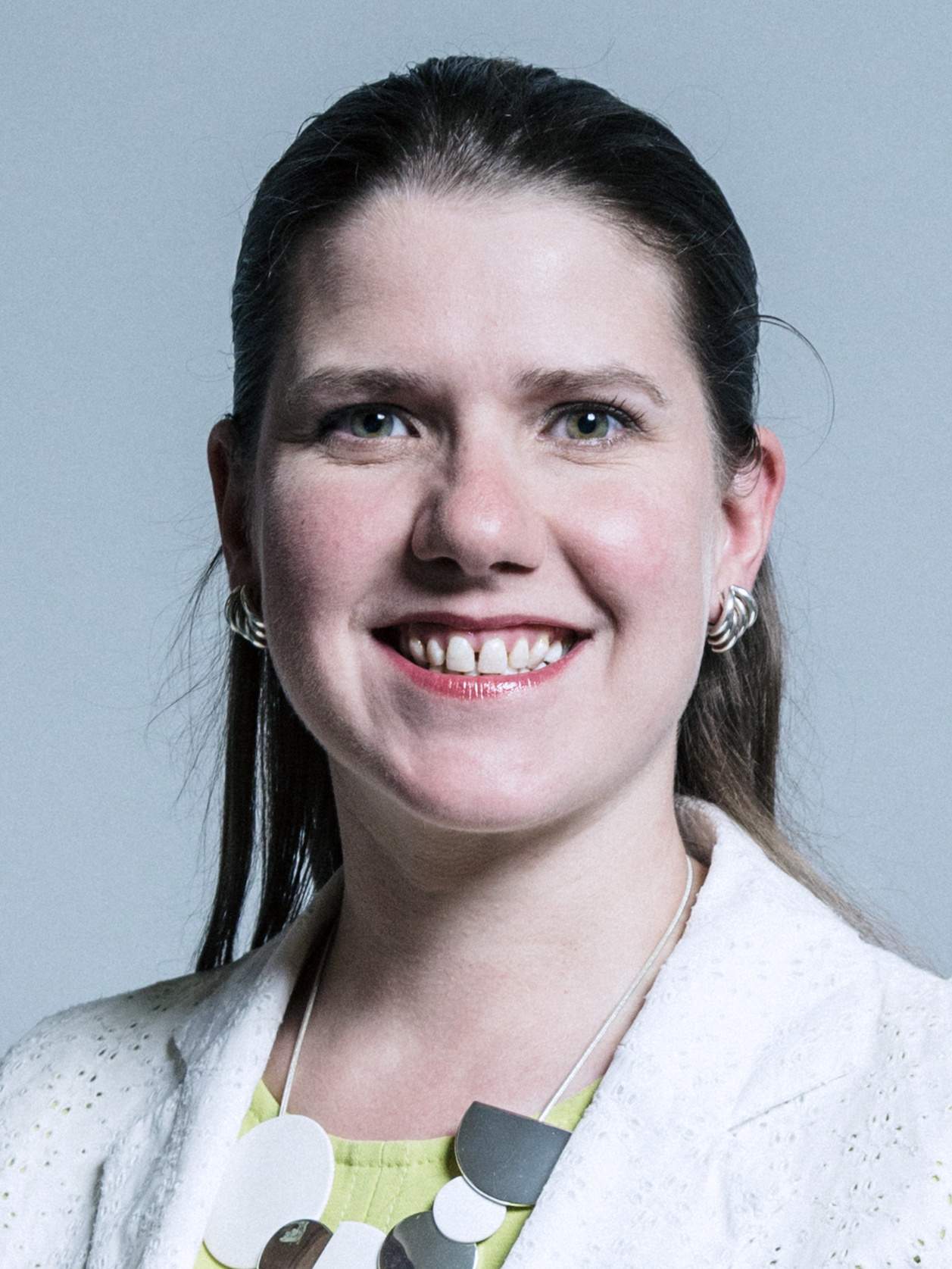
	First party	Second party
Leader	Boris Johnson	Jeremy Corbyn
Party	Conservative	Labour
Leader since	23 July 2019	12 September 2015
Leader's seat	Uxbridge and South Ruislip	Islington North
Last election	317 seats, 42.3%	262 seats, 40.0%
Seats before	298	262
Seats won	365	202 (Note: The figure does not include Sir Lindsay Hoyle, the speaker of the House of Commons, who was included in the Labour seat total by some media outlets. By longstanding convention, the speaker severs all ties to their affiliated party upon being elected as speaker.)
Seat change	▲48	▼60
Popular vote	13,966,454	10,269,051
Percentage	43.6%	32.1%
Swing	▲1.3 pp	▼7.9 pp
	Third party	Fourth party
Leader	Nicola Sturgeon	Jo Swinson
Party	SNP	Liberal Democrats
Leader since	14 November 2014	22 July 2019
Leader's seat	Did not stand (Note: Nicola Sturgeon sat in the Scottish Parliament for Glasgow Southside. Ian Blackford, MP for Ross, Skye and Lochaber, was the SNP leader at Westminster.)	East Dunbartonshire (lost seat)
Last election	35 seats, 3.0%	12 seats, 7.4%
Seats before	35	20
Seats won	48 (Note: The number includes Neale Hanvey, who was suspended from the party at the time of his election and thus took his seat as an independent.)	11
Seat change	▲13	▼1
Popular vote	1,242,380	3,696,419
Percentage	3.9%	11.6%
Swing	▲0.8 pp	▲4.2 pp
- A map presenting the results of the election, by party of the MP elected from each constituency

- Composition of the House of Commons after the election
Prime Minister before election
Boris Johnson
Conservative
Prime Minister after election
Boris Johnson
Conservative

A general election was held in the United Kingdom on 12 December 2019, with 47,074,800 registered voters entitled to vote to elect 650 Members of Parliament (MPs) to the House of Commons. The governing Conservative Party, led by Prime Minister Boris Johnson, won a majority of 80 seats, (Note: The Conservatives effectively had an 87-seat working majority, given that the 7 Sinn Féin MPs practised abstentionism and did not take their seats, and that the speaker and deputies do not vote.) a net gain of 48, on 43.6 per cent of the popular vote, the highest percentage for any party since the 1979 general election. This was the second national election to be held in 2019 in the United Kingdom, the first being the 2019 European Parliament election.

After it lost its parliamentary majority at the 2017 general election, the Conservative Party governed in minority with the support of the Democratic Unionist Party (DUP). The prime minister, Theresa May, resigned in July 2019 after repeatedly failing to pass her Brexit withdrawal agreement in parliament. Johnson succeeded her as the leader of the Conservative Party and as prime minister in July 2019. Johnson could not persuade Parliament to approve a revised withdrawal agreement by the end of October, and chose to call a snap election, which the House of Commons supported under the Early Parliamentary General Election Act 2019. Opinion polls showed a firm lead for the Conservatives against the opposition Labour Party throughout the campaign.

The Conservatives won 365 seats, their highest number and proportion since the 1987 general election, and recorded their highest share of the popular vote since 1979; many of their gains were made in seats once considered safe for Labour, dubbed the red wall, which had voted strongly in favour of British withdrawal from the EU in the 2016 European Union (EU) membership referendum. Labour won 202 seats, its fewest since the 1935 general election. The Scottish National Party (SNP) made a net gain of 13 seats with 45 per cent of the vote in Scotland, winning 48 of the 59 seats there. The Liberal Democrats increased their vote share to 11.6 per cent, but won only 11 seats, a net loss of one since the last election. The party's leader, Jo Swinson, lost her seat to the SNP, thus triggering the 2020 party leadership election, which was won by Ed Davey. The DUP won a plurality of seats in Northern Ireland. The Social Democratic and Labour Party (SDLP) and the Alliance Party of Northern Ireland (APNI) regained parliamentary representation as the DUP lost seats.

The election result gave Johnson the mandate he sought from the electorate to formally implement the withdrawal of the United Kingdom from the European Union, and to complete the repeal of the European Communities Act 1972 on 31 January 2020. Jeremy Corbyn, Labour's leader at the election, resigned, triggering the 2020 party leadership election, which was won by his shadow Brexit secretary, Keir Starmer. Jane Dodds, the Liberal Democrats' leader in Wales, was also unseated in Brecon and Radnorshire. In Northern Ireland, Irish nationalist MPs outnumbered unionists for the first time, although the unionist popular vote remained higher at 43.1 per cent, and the seven Sinn Féin MPs did not take their seats due to their tradition of abstentionism.

Despite being elected with a large majority, Johnson went on to resign amid a government crisis in 2022, being followed by Liz Truss for fifty days and then by Rishi Sunak, who went on to lead the Conservatives to a landslide defeat in the subsequent election. This was the last election to be held under the reign of Elizabeth II.

== Background ==
In July 2016, Theresa May was elected Prime Minister to succeed David Cameron, who had resigned following the 2016 Brexit referendum. The Conservative Party had governed since the 2010 general election, initially in coalition with the Liberal Democrats and then alone with a small majority following the 2015 general election. In the 2017 general election, May lost her majority but was able to resume office as a result of a confidence and supply agreement with Northern Ireland's Democratic Unionist Party (DUP), known as the Conservative–DUP agreement. In the face of opposition from the DUP and Conservative backbenchers, the second May ministry was unable to pass its Brexit withdrawal agreement by 29 March 2019, so some political commentators considered that an early general election was likely.

The opposition Labour Party called for a 2019 vote of confidence in the May ministry but the motion, held in January, failed. May resigned following her party's poor performance in the 2019 European Parliament election during the first extension granted by the European Union for negotiations on the withdrawal agreement. Boris Johnson won the 2019 Conservative leadership election and became the prime minister on 24 July 2019. Along with attempting to revise the withdrawal agreement arranged by his predecessor's negotiations, Johnson made three attempts to hold a snap election under the process defined in the Fixed-term Parliaments Act 2011, which required a two-thirds supermajority in order for an election to take place.

All three attempts to call an election failed to gain support; Parliament insisted that Johnson "take a no-deal Brexit off the table first" and secure a negotiated Withdrawal Agreement, expressed in particular by its enactment against his will of the European Union (Withdrawal) (No. 2) Act 2019, often called the Benn Act, after Labour MP Hilary Benn, who introduced the bill. After failing to pass a revised deal before the first extension's deadline of 31 October 2019, Johnson agreed to a second extension on negotiations with the European Union and finally secured a revised withdrawal agreement.

Parliament agreed to an election through a motion proposed by the Liberal Democrats and the Scottish National Party (SNP) on 28 October. The Early Parliamentary General Election Act 2019 (EPGEA) was passed in the House of Commons by 438 votes to 20; an attempt to pass an amendment by opposition parties for the election to be held on 9 December failed by 315 votes to 295. The House of Lords followed suit on 30 October, with royal assent made the day after for the ratification of the EPGEA.

== Date of the election ==
The deadline for candidate nominations was 14 November 2019, with political campaigning for four weeks until polling day on 12 December. On the day of the election, polling stations across the country were open from 7 am, and closed at 10 pm. The date chosen for the 2019 general election made it the first to be held in December since the 1923 general election.

=== Voting eligibility ===
Individuals eligible to vote had to be registered to vote by midnight on 26 November. To be eligible to vote, individuals had to be aged 18 or over; residing as an Irish or Commonwealth citizen at an address in the United Kingdom, (Note: Persons without a permanent or fixed address can make a declaration of local connection to a particular location in order to register.) or be a British citizen overseas who registered to vote in the last 15 years; (Note: In the case of a British citizen who moved abroad before the age of 18, they can vote if their parent or guardian was on the Electoral Register in the last fifteen years.) and not legally excluded (on grounds of detainment in prison, a mental hospital, or on the run from law enforcement), or disqualified from voting. Anyone who qualified as an anonymous elector had until midnight on 6 December to register. (Note: The deadline for the receipt and determination of anonymous electoral registration applications is one working day before the publication date of the notice of alteration to the Electoral Register (that is the sixth working day before polling day).)

=== Timetable ===
Key dates
Date	Event
Tuesday 29 October	Passage of the Early Parliamentary General Election Act 2019 through the House of Commons.
Wednesday 30 October	Passage of the Early Parliamentary General Election Act 2019 through the House of Lords.
Thursday 31 October	Early Parliamentary General Election Act 2019 received royal assent and comes into force immediately. The Act set 12 December as the date for the next parliamentary general election.
Wednesday 6 November	Dissolution of parliament and official start of the campaign. Beginning of purdah. Royal Proclamation issued, summoning a new Parliament and setting the date for its first meeting.
Thursday 7 November	Receipt of writ of election – legal documents declaring election issued.
Friday 8 November	Notices of election were given in constituencies.
Thursday 14 November	Nominations of candidates closed.
Saturday 16 November	Lists of candidates were published for each constituency.
Thursday 21 November	Deadline to register for a postal vote at 5pm in Northern Ireland.
Tuesday 26 November	Deadline to register for a postal vote at 5pm (Great Britain), as well as registering to vote across the United Kingdom at 11:59pm.
Wednesday 4 December	Deadline to register for a proxy vote at 5pm. Exemptions applied for emergencies.
Thursday 12 December	Polling Day – polls opened at 7 am to 10 pm.
Friday 13 December	Results announced for all the 650 constituencies. End of purdah.
Tuesday 17 December	First meeting of the new Parliament of the United Kingdom, for the formal election of Speaker of the House of Commons and the swearing-in of members, ahead of the State Opening of Parliament's first session.
Thursday 19 December	State Opening of Parliament and queen's speech.

== Contesting political parties and candidates ==
Most candidates are representatives of a political party, which must be registered with the Electoral Commission's Register. Those who do not belong to one must use the label Independent or none. In the 2019 election 3,415 candidates stood: 206 being independents, the rest representing one of 68 political parties.

== Campaign ==
=== Campaign background ===
Donations to political parties in last quarter of 2019
Party	Donations (£ millions)
Conservative	37.7
Liberal Democrats	13.6
Labour	10.7
Brexit	7.2
SNP	0.2

The Conservative Party and Labour Party have been the two biggest political parties, and have supplied every Prime Minister since the 1922 general election. The Conservative Party had governed since the 2010 election, in coalition with the Liberal Democrats from 2010 to 2015. At the 2015 general election, the Conservative Party committed to offering a referendum on whether the United Kingdom should leave the European Union (EU) and won a majority in that election. A referendum was held in June 2016, and the Leave campaign won by 51.9% to 48.1%.

United Kingdom invocation of Article 50 of the Treaty on European Union came in March 2017, and Theresa May triggered a snap election in 2017, in order to demonstrate support for her planned negotiation of Brexit. Instead, the Conservative Party lost seats. They won a plurality of MPs but not a majority, and the result was a hung parliament. They formed a minority government, with the Democratic Unionist Party (DUP) as their confidence and supply partner. Neither May nor her successor Boris Johnson, the winner of the 2019 Conservative leadership election, was able to secure parliamentary support either for a deal on the terms of the country's exit from the EU, or for exiting the EU without an agreed deal. Johnson later succeeded in bringing his withdrawal agreement to a second reading in Parliament, following another extension until January 2020.

After Johnson's 2019 win, a new Withdrawal Agreement Bill was introduced in 2020. Compared to its 2019 October predecessor, this bill offered, in the words of political scientist Meg Russell, "significantly weaker parliamentary oversight of Brexit ... giving parliament no formal role in agreeing the future relationship negotiating objectives, and a diminished role in approving any resulting treaty."

During the lifespan of the 2017 Parliament, twenty MPs resigned from their parties, mostly due to disputes with their party leaderships; some formed new parties and alliances. In February 2019, eight Labour and three Conservative MPs left their parties to sit together as The Independent Group. Having undergone a split and two name changes, at dissolution, this group numbered five MPs who sat as the registered party The Independent Group for Change under the leadership of Anna Soubry.

Two MPs sat in a group called The Independents, which at its peak had five members. One MP created the Birkenhead Social Justice Party, while a further 20 MPs who began as Labour or Conservative ended Parliament as unaffiliated independents. Seven MPs, from both the Conservatives and Labour, joined the Liberal Democrats during Parliament, in combination with a gain after the 2019 Brecon and Radnorshire by-election. By the time Parliament was dissolved, the Liberal Democrats had raised their number from 12 at the election to 20 at dissolution.

One reason for the defections from the Labour Party was the ongoing row over alleged antisemitism in the Labour Party. Labour entered the election campaign while under investigation by the Equality and Human Rights Commission. The Jewish Labour Movement declared that it would not generally campaign for Labour. The Conservative Party was also criticised for not doing enough to tackle the alleged Islamophobia in the Conservative Party. The Conservatives ended the previous parliamentary period with fewer seats than they had started with because of defections and also saw the 2019 suspension of rebel Conservative MPs for going against the party line by voting to prevent a no-deal Brexit. Of the 21 expelled, 10 were subsequently reinstated, while the others continued as independents.

=== Policy positions ===
==== Brexit ====
The major parties had a wide variety of stances on Brexit. The Conservative Party supported leaving under the terms of the withdrawal agreement as negotiated by Johnson (amending May's previous agreement), and this agreement formed a central part of the Conservative campaign via the slogan "Get Brexit Done". The Brexit Party was in favour of a no-deal Brexit, with its leader Nigel Farage calling for Johnson to drop the deal.

The Conservative manifesto read "If we elect a majority of Conservative MPs to Parliament, we will start putting our deal through Parliament before Christmas and we will leave the European Union in January" which ultimately happened.

The Labour Party proposed a renegotiation of the withdrawal agreement, towards a closer post-withdrawal relationship with the EU, and would then put this forward as an option in a referendum alongside the option of remaining in the EU. The Labour Party's campaigning stance in that referendum would be decided at a special conference. In a Question Time special featuring four party leaders, Labour leader Jeremy Corbyn said that he would stay neutral in the referendum campaign.

The Liberal Democrats, Scottish National Party, Plaid Cymru, The Independent Group for Change, and the Green Party of England and Wales were all opposed to Brexit, and proposed that a further referendum be held with the option, for which they would campaign, to remain in the EU. The Liberal Democrats originally pledged that if they formed a majority government, which was considered a highly unlikely outcome by observers, they would revoke the Article 50 notification immediately and cancel Brexit. Part-way through the campaign, the Liberal Democrats dropped the policy of revoking Article 50 after the party realised it was not going to win a majority in the election.

The Democratic Unionist Party was in favour of a withdrawal agreement in principle but opposed the deals negotiated by both May and Johnson, believing that they created too great a divide between Northern Ireland and the rest of the United Kingdom. Sinn Féin, the Social Democratic and Labour Party, the Ulster Unionist Party (UUP), and the Alliance Party of Northern Ireland all favoured remaining in the EU. The UUP did not see a second referendum as a necessary route to achieving this goal.

==== Environment ====
The Labour Party promised what they described as a green industrial revolution. This included support for renewable energies and a promise to plant 2 billion trees by 2040. The party also promised to transition to electrify the United Kingdom's bus fleet by 2030. The Liberal Democrats promised to put the environment at the heart of their agenda with a promise to plant 60 million trees a year. They promised to significantly reduce carbon emissions by 2030 and hit zero carbon emissions by 2045. By 2030, they planned to generate 80% of the country's energy needs from renewable energies such as solar power and wind and retrofit 26 million homes with insulation by 2030. They also promised to build more environmentally friendly homes and to establish a new Department for the Climate Crisis.

The Conservatives pledged net zero emissions by 2050 with investment in clean energy solutions and green infrastructure to reduce carbon emissions and pollution. They also pledged to plant 30 million trees and boost wind and solar energy.

==== Tax and spending commitments ====
In September 2019, the Conservative government performed a spending review, where they announced plans to increase public spending by £13.8 billion a year, and reaffirmed plans to spend another £33.9 billion a year on the National Health Service (NHS) by 2023. Chancellor Sajid Javid said the government had turned the page on 10 years of austerity in the United Kingdom.

During the election, the parties produced manifestos that outlined spending in addition to that already planned. The Conservative Party manifesto was described as having "little in the way of changes to tax" by the Institute for Fiscal Studies (IFS). The decision to keep the rate of corporation tax at 19%, and not reduce it to 17% as planned, was expected to raise £6 billion a year. The plan to increase the national insurance threshold for employees and self-employed to £9,500 would cost £2 billion a year. They committed to not raise rates of income tax, National Insurance, or VAT.

There were increased spending commitments of £3 billion current spending and £8 billion investment spending. Overall, this would have led to the country's debt as a percentage of GDP remaining stable. The IFS assessed that it would rise in the event of a no-deal Brexit. The Labour Party manifesto planned to raise an extra £78 billion a year from taxes over the course of Parliament, with sources including:

- £24bn – raising the headline rate of corporation tax to 26%
- £6.3bn – tax the global profits of multinationals according to the United Kingdom's share of global employment, assets, and sales, not British profits
- £4.0bn – abolish patent box and R&D tax credit for large companies
- £4.3bn – cutting unspecified corporation tax reliefs
- £9bn – financial transactions tax
- £14bn – dividends and capital gains
- £6bn – anti-avoidance
- £5bn – increases in income tax rates above £80,000 a year
- £5bn – other

In addition, Labour was to obtain income from the Inclusive Ownership Fund, windfall tax on oil companies, and some smaller tax changes. There were increased spending commitments of £98 billion current spending and £55 billion investment spending. Overall, this would have led to the national debt as a percentage of GDP rising. Labour's John McDonnell said borrowing would only be for investment and one-offs (e.g. compensating WASPI women, not shown above), and not for day-to-day spending.

The Liberal Democrats manifesto planned to raise an extra £36 billion per year from taxes over the course of Parliament, with sources including:

- £10bn – raising corporation tax to 20%
- £7bn – 1% point rise in all rates of income tax
- £5bn – abolish the capital gains tax allowance
- £5bn – air passenger duty on frequent flyers
- £6bn – anti-avoidance
- £3bn – other

There were increased commitments of £37 billion current spending and £26 billion investment spending, which would overall lead to the debt as a percentage of GDP falling, partly due to improved economic conditions which would result from staying in the EU.

===== Institute for Fiscal Studies analysis =====
The Institute of Fiscal Studies (IFS), an influential research body, released on 28 November its in-depth analysis of the manifestos of the three main national political parties. The analysis provided a summary of the financial promises made by each party and an inspection of the accuracy of claims around government income and expenditure. The IFS reported that neither the Conservatives nor the Labour Party had published a "properly credible prospectus".

Its analysis of the Conservative manifesto concluded there was "essentially nothing new in the manifesto", that there was "little in the way of changes to tax, spending, welfare or anything else", and that they had already promised increased spending for health and education whilst in government. The Labour manifesto was described as introducing "enormous economic and social change", and increasing the role of the state to be bigger than anything in the last 40 years.

The IFS highlighted a raft of changes in including free childcare, university, personal care, and prescriptions, as well as nationalisations, labour market regulations, increases in the minimum wage, and enforcing "effective ownership of 10% of large companies from current owners to a combination of employees and government". The IFS said that Labour's vision "is of a state not so dissimilar to those seen in many other successful Western European economies", and presumed that the manifesto should be seen as "a long-term prospectus for change rather than a realistic deliverable plan for a five-year parliament". They said that the Liberal Democrats manifesto was not as radical as the Labour manifesto but was a "decisive move away from the policies of the past decade".

The Conservative manifesto was criticised for a commitment not to raise rates of income tax, National Insurance, or VAT, as this put a significant constraint on reactions to events that might affect government finances. One such event could be the "die in a ditch" promise to terminate the Brexit transition period by the end of 2020, which risked harming the economy. The IFS also stated that it is "highly likely" spending under a Conservative government would be higher than in that party's manifesto, partly due to a number of uncosted commitments. Outside of commitments to the NHS, the proposals would leave public service spending 14% lower in 2023–2024 than it was in 2010–2011, which the IFS described as "no more austerity perhaps, but an awful lot of it baked in".

The IFS stated it had "serious doubt" that tax rises proposed would raise the amount Labour suggested, and said that they would need to introduce more broad based tax increases. They assessed that the public sector does not have the capacity to increase investment spending as Labour would want. The IFS further assessed the claim that tax rises would only hit the top 5% of earners as "certainly progressive" but "clearly not true", with those under that threshold impacted by changes to the marriage allowance, taxes on dividends, or capital gains, and lower wages or higher prices that might be passed on from corporation tax changes. Some of Labour's proposals were described as "huge and complex undertakings", where significant care is required in implementation.

The IFS was particularly critical of the policy to compensate the WASPI women, announced after the manifesto, which was a £58bn promise to women who are "relatively well off on average" and would result in public finances going off target. They said that Labour's manifesto would not increase UK public spending as a share of national income above Germany. They found that Labour's plan to spend and invest would boost economic growth but that the impact of tax rises, government regulation, nationalisations, and the inclusive ownership fund could reduce growth, meaning the overall impact of Labour's plan on growth was uncertain.

The IFS described the plans of the Liberal Democrats as a radical tax and spend package, and said that the proposals would require lower borrowing than Conservative or Labour plans. The report said they were the only party whose proposals would put debt "on a decisively downward path", praising their plan to put 1p on income tax to go to the NHS as "simple, progressive and would raise a secure level of revenue". The IFS also said plans to "virtually quintuple" current spending levels on universal free childcare amounted to "creating a whole new leg of the universal welfare state". The IFS said that the SNP's manifesto was not costed. Their proposals on spending increases and tax cuts would mean the government would have to borrow to cover day-to-day spending. They concluded that the SNP's plans for Scottish independence would likely require increased austerity.

==== Other issues ====
The Conservatives proposed increasing spending on public services, including the NHS and education. They also proposed increased funding for childcare and on the environment. They proposed more funding for care services and to work with other parties on reforming how care is delivered. They wished to maintain the triple lock on pensions. They proposed investing in local infrastructure, including rail, bus, cycle, and electric cars. They pledged to build a high speed new rail line between Leeds and Manchester.

Labour proposed significantly increasing government spending to 45% of national output, which would be high compared to most of British history. This was to pay for an increased NHS budget; stopping state pension age rises; introducing a National Care Service providing free personal care; move to a net-zero carbon economy by the 2030s; nationalising key industries; scrapping Universal Credit; free bus travel for under-25s; building 100,000 council houses per year; and other proposals.

Within this, the Labour Party proposed to take rail-operating companies, energy supply networks, Royal Mail, sewerage infrastructure, and England's private water companies back into public ownership. Labour proposed nationalising part of the BT Group and to provide free broadband to everyone, along with free education for six years during each person's adult life. Over a decade, Labour planned to reduce the average full-time weekly working hours to 32, with resulting productivity increases facilitating no loss of pay. Labour's spending plans were endorsed by more than 160 economists and academics and characterised as a "serious programme" to deal with internal problems.

The main priority of the Liberal Democrats was opposing Brexit. Other policies included increased spending on the NHS; free childcare for two-to-four-year-olds; recruiting 20,000 more teachers; generating 80% of electricity from renewable sources by 2030; freezing train fares; and legalising cannabis. The Brexit Party was also focused on Brexit. It opposed privatising the NHS. It sought to reduce immigration, cutting net migration to 50,000 per year; cutting VAT on domestic fuel; banning the exporting of waste; free broadband in deprived regions; scrapping the BBC licence fee; and abolishing inheritance tax, interest on student loans, and High Speed 2. It also wanted to move to a United States-style supreme court.

The policies of the SNP included a second referendum on Scottish independence to be held in 2020, as well as one on Brexit, removing the Trident nuclear deterrent, and devolution across issues like as employment law, drug policy, and migration. The Liberal Democrats, the Greens, the SNP, and Labour all supported a ban on fracking in the United Kingdom, whilst the Conservatives proposed approving fracking on a case-by-case basis.

=== Party positions in the event of a hung parliament ===
The Conservatives and Labour insisted they were on course for outright majorities, while smaller parties were quizzed about what they would do in the event of a hung parliament. The Liberal Democrats said that they would not actively support Johnson or Corbyn becoming Prime Minister but that they could, if an alternative could not be achieved, abstain on votes allowing a minority government to form if there was support for a second referendum on Brexit. The SNP ruled out either supporting the Conservatives or a coalition with Labour but spoke about a looser form of support, such as a confidence and supply arrangement with the latter, if they supported a second referendum on Scottish independence.

The DUP previously supported the Conservative government but withdrew that support given their opposition to Johnson's proposed Brexit deal. It said that it would never support Corbyn as prime minister but could work with Labour if that party were led by someone else. Labour's position on a hung parliament was that it would do no deals with any other party, citing Corbyn to say: "We are out here to win it." At the same time, it was prepared to adopt key policies proposed by the SNP and Liberal Democrats to woo them into supporting a minority government. The UUP said they would never support Corbyn as prime minister, with their leader Steve Aiken also saying that he "can't really see" any situation in which they would support a Conservative government either. Their focus would be on remaining in the EU.

=== Tactical voting ===
Under the first-past-the-post electoral system, there is often concern, especially in marginal seats, that if voters of similar ideological leanings are split between multiple different parties they may allow a victory for a candidate with significantly different views. In the early stages of the campaign, there was considerable discussion of tactical voting, generally in the context of support or opposition to Brexit, and whether parties would stand in all seats or not.

There were various electoral pacts and unilateral decisions. The Brexit Party chose not to stand against sitting Conservative candidates but stood in most other constituencies. The Brexit Party alleged that pressure was put on its candidates by the Conservatives to withdraw, including the offer of peerages, which would be illegal. This was denied by the Conservative Party. Under the banner of Unite to Remain, the Liberal Democrats, Plaid Cymru, and the Green Party of England and Wales agreed an electoral pact in some seats; some commentators criticised the Liberal Democrats for not standing down in some Labour seats.

A number of tactical voting websites were set up in an attempt to help voters choose the candidate in their constituency who would be best placed to beat the Conservative one. The websites did not always give the same advice, which Michael Savage, political editor of The Guardian, said had the potential to confuse voters. One of the websites, named GetVoting.org and set up by Best for Britain, was accused of giving bogus advice in Labour/Conservative marginal seats. The website, which had links to the Liberal Democrats, was criticised for advising pro-Remain voters to back the Liberal Democrats, when doing so risked pulling voters away from Labour candidates and enabling the Conservative candidate to gain most votes.

The website changed their controversial recommendation in Kensington to Labour, which had won it in 2017 by 20 votes, and lined up with Tacticalvote.co.uk in this seat. Describing itself as a progressive grassroots campaign not affiliated with any political party, Tacticalvote.co.uk was previously known as Tactical2017. Gina Miller's Remain United and People's Vote kept their recommendation for the Liberal Democrats. This caused a lot of confusion around tactical voting, as it was reported that the sites did not match one another's advice.

Further into the election period, tactical voting websites that relied on multilevel regression with poststratification, such as Best for Britain, People's Vote, Remain United, and Survation, changed their recommendations on other seats because of new data. The effectiveness of their tactical voting has also been questioned, and the loss of Kensington, which was a Labour gain in 2017, was blamed by Labour MPs on Liberal Democrats for splitting the vote.

In the final weekend before voting, The Guardian cited a poll suggesting that the Conservative Party held a 15% lead over Labour; on the same day, the Conservative-backing Daily Telegraph emphasised a poll indicating a lower 8% lead. Senior opposition politicians from Labour, the Liberal Democrats, and the SNP launched a late-stage appeal to anti-Conservative voters to consider switching allegiance in the general election, amid signs that tactical voting in a relatively small number of marginal seats could deprive Johnson of a majority in parliament.

Shortly before the election, The Observer newspaper recommended Remainers tactically vote for 50 Labour, Liberal Democrats, SNP, and independent candidates across Great Britain; of these, 13 triumphed, 9 of which were SNP gains in Scotland (in line with a broader trend of relative success for the party), along with four in England divided equally between Labour and the Liberal Democrats. The pollster responsible argued in the aftermath that the unpopularity of the Labour leadership limited the effectiveness of tactical voting. Other research suggested it would have taken 78% of people voting tactically to prevent a Conservative majority completely, and it would not have been possible to deliver a Labour majority.

=== Canvassing and leafleting ===
Predictions of an overall Conservative majority were based on their targeting of primarily Labour-held, Brexit-backing seats in the Midlands and the north of England. At the start of the election period, Labour-supporting organisation Momentum held what was described as "the largest mobilising call in UK history", involving more than 2,000 canvassers. The organisation challenged Labour supporters to devote a week or more to campaigning full-time; by 4 December, 1,400 people had signed up. Momentum also developed an app called My Campaign Map that updated members about where they could be more effective, particularly in canvassing in marginal constituencies. Over one weekend during the campaign period, 700 Labour supporters campaigned in Iain Duncan Smith's constituency, Chingford and Woodford Green, which was regarded as a marginal, with a majority of 2,438 votes at the 2017 general election.

The Liberal Democrats were considered possible winners of a number of Conservative-held southern English constituencies; a large swing was postulated that might even topple Dominic Raab in Esher and Walton. At the beginning of the 2019 campaign, they had been accused of attempting to mislead voters by using selective opinion polling data, and use of a quotation attributed to The Guardian rather than to their leader Jo Swinson. They were also accused of making campaign leaflets look like newspapers, although this practice had been used by all major British political parties for many years, including by Labour and the Conservatives during this election.

The Liberal Democrats won a court case stopping the SNP from distributing a "potentially defamatory" leaflet in Swinson's constituency over false claims about funding she had received. Two Labour Party campaigners, both in their seventies, were verbally abused and physically assaulted in separate attacks on the weekend of 23–24 November. One attack occurred in Bromyard, Herefordshire, and the other in Rotherham, South Yorkshire. Party officials in Bromyard, where Labour campaigners experienced red-baiting and had been called "Marxists", decided that activists should only canvass in pairs.

=== Online campaigning ===
The use of social media advertising was seen as particularly useful to political parties as it could be used to target people of particular demographics. Labour was reported to have the most interactions, with The Times describing Labour's "aggressive, anti-establishment messages" as "beating clever Tory memes". In the first week of November, Labour was reported to have four of the five most liked tweets by political parties, many of the top interactions of Facebook posts, as well as doing very well on Instagram, where younger voters are particularly active. Bloomberg News reported that between 6 and 21 November the views on Twitter/Facebook were 18.7/31.0 million for Labour, 10/15.5 million for the Conservatives, 2.9/2.0 million for the Brexit Party, and 0.4/1.4 million for the Liberal Democrats.

Brexit was the most tweeted topic for the Conservative Party (~45% of tweets), the Liberal Democrats, and the Brexit Party (~40% each). Labour focused on health care (24.1%), the environment, and business, mentioning Brexit in less than 5 per cent of its tweets. Devolution was the topic most tweeted about by the SNP (29.8%) and Plaid Cymru (21.4%), and the environment was the top issue for the Green Party (45.9%) on Twitter. The Conservatives were unique in their focus on taxation (16.2%), and the Brexit Party on defence (14%).

Prior to the campaign, the Conservatives contracted New Zealand marketing agency Topham Guerin, which had been credited with helping Australia's Liberal–National Coalition unexpectedly win the 2019 Australian federal election. The agency's social media approach was described as purposefully posting badly-designed social media material that becomes viral and so would be seen by a wider audience. Some of the Conservative social media activity created headlines challenging whether it was deceptive, including by the BBC, amid disinformation concerns. This included editing a clip of Keir Starmer to give the appearance that he was unable to answer a question about Labour's Brexit policy. In response to criticism over the doctored Starmer footage, Conservative Party chairman James Cleverly said the clip of Starmer was satire and "obviously edited".

==== Veracity of statements by political parties ====
During the 19 November debate between Johnson and Corbyn hosted by ITV, the press office of the Conservative Campaign Headquarters (CCHQ) re-branded their Twitter account (@CCHQPress) as factcheckUK (with "from CCHQ" in small text appearing underneath the logo in the account's banner image), which critics suggested could be mistaken for that of an independent fact-checking body, and published posts supporting the Conservative's position. In defence, Conservative chairman Cleverly stated: "The Twitter handle of the CCHQ press office remained CCHQPress, so it's clear the nature of the site", and as "calling out when the Labour Party put what they know to be complete fabrications in the public domain."

In response to the re-branding on Twitter, the Electoral Commission, which does not have a role in regulating election campaign content, called on all campaigners to act "responsibly". Fact-checking body Full Fact criticised this behaviour as "inappropriate and misleading", and Twitter stated that it would take "decisive corrective action" if there were "further attempts to mislead people".

First Draft News released an analysis of Facebook ads posted by political parties between 1 and 4 December. The analysis reported that 88% of the 6,749 posts the Conservatives made had been "challenged" by fact checker Full Fact. 5,000 of these ads related to a "40 new hospitals" claim, of which Full Fact concluded only six had been costed, with the others only receiving money for planning, with building uncosted and due to occur after 2025. 4,000 featured inaccurate claims about the cost of Labour's spending plans to the tax payer. 500 related to a "50,000 more nurses" pledge, consisting of 31,500 new nurses, and convincing 18,500 nurses already in post to remain.

16.5% of Liberal Democrats posts were highlighted, which related to claims they are the only party to beat Labour, the Conservatives, or the SNP "in seats like yours". None of the posts made by Labour in the period were challenged, although posts made on 10 December stating that a "Labour government would save households thousands in bills" and the Conservative Party had "cut £8bn from social care" since 2010 were flagged as misleading. According to the BBC, Labour supporters had been more likely to share unpaid-for electioneering posts, some of which included misleading claims.

=== Television debates ===
← 2017 debates	2019	→ 2024 debates

ITV aired a head-to-head election debate between Johnson and Corbyn on 19 November, hosted by Julie Etchingham. ITV Cymru Wales aired a debate featuring representatives from the Conservatives, Labour, the Liberal Democrats, Plaid Cymru, and the Brexit Party on 17 November, hosted by Adrian Masters. Johnson cancelled his ITV interview with Etchingham, scheduled for 6 December, whilst the other major party leaders agreed to be interviewed.

On the BBC, broadcaster Andrew Neil was due to separately interview party leaders in The Andrew Neil Interviews, and BBC Northern Ireland journalist Mark Carruthers to separately interview the five main Northern Irish political leaders. The leaders of the SNP, Labour, Plaid Cymru, the Liberal Democrats, and the Brexit Party were all interviewed by Neil and the leader of the Conservative Party was not, leading Neil to release a challenge to Johnson to be interviewed. The Conservatives dismissed Neil's challenge. BBC Scotland, BBC Cymru Wales, and BBC Northern Ireland also hosted a variety of regional debates.

Channel 4 cancelled a debate scheduled for 24 November after Johnson would not agree to a head-to-head with Corbyn. A few days later, the network hosted a leaders' debate focused on the climate. Johnson and Farage did not attend and were replaced on stage by ice sculptures with their party names written on them. The Conservatives alleged this was part of a pattern of bias at the channel, complained to Ofcom that Channel 4 had breached due impartiality rules as a result of their refusal to allow Michael Gove to appear as a substitute, and suggested that they might review the channel's broadcasting licence. In response, the Conservatives, as well as the Brexit Party, did not send a representative to Channel 4's "Everything but Brexit" on 8 December, and Conservative ministers were briefed not to appear on Channel 4 News. Ofcom rejected the Conservatives' complaint on 3 December, as "other participants had only agreed to attend on the basis that they would be debating against other leaders".

Sky News was due to hold a three-way election debate on 28 November, inviting Johnson, Corbyn, and Swinson. Swinson confirmed she would attend the debate, which was later cancelled after agreements could not be made with Corbyn or Johnson.

2019 United Kingdom general election debates in Great Britain
Date	Organisers	Venue	Region	Viewing figures (millions)	P Present S Surrogate NI Not invited A Absent N No debate						
Date	Organisers	Venue	Region	Viewing figures (millions)	Con	Lab	SNP	LD	Plaid	GPEW	Brexit
17 November	ITV Cymru Wales	ITV Wales Studios, Cardiff	Wales	0.28	S Davies	S Thomas-Symonds	NI	P Dodds	S Saville Roberts	NI	S Gill
19 November	ITV	dock10 studios, Salford	UK	7.34	P Johnson	P Corbyn	NI	NI	NI	NI	NI
22 November	BBC (Question Time)	Octagon Centre, Sheffield	UK	4.62	P Johnson	P Corbyn	P Sturgeon	P Swinson	NI	NI	NI
24 November (cancelled)	~~Channel 4~~	~~N/A~~	~~UK~~	~~N/A~~	N Johnson	N Corbyn	NI	NI	NI	NI	NI
26 November	BBC Wales (Wales Live)	Pembrokeshire County; Showground, Haverfordwest	Wales	TBA	S Davies	S Griffith	NI	P Dodds	S Saville Roberts	NI	S Wells
28 November (cancelled)	~~Sky News~~	~~N/A~~	~~UK~~	~~N/A~~	N Johnson	N Corbyn	NI	N Swinson	NI	NI	NI
28 November	Channel 4 (climate and nature)	ITN Headquarters, London	UK	TBA	A (Note: Channel 4 described this as a leaders-only debate and refused to accept Michael Gove as substitute.); Johnson	P Corbyn	P Sturgeon	P Swinson	P Price	P Berry	A Farage
29 November	BBC	Senedd, Cardiff	UK	TBA	S Sunak	S Long-Bailey	P Sturgeon	P Swinson	P Price	S Lucas	S Tice
1 December	ITV	Dock10, Salford	UK	TBA	S Sunak	S Burgon	P Sturgeon	P Swinson	P Price	P Berry	P Farage
3 December	BBC Wales	Wrexham Glyndŵr University, Wrexham	Wales	TBA	S Jones	S Hanson	NI	S John	S ap Iorwerth	NI	P Gill
3 December	STV	STV Pacific Quay, Glasgow	Scotland	TBA	P Carlaw	P Leonard	P Sturgeon	P Rennie	NI	NI	NI
6 December	BBC	Maidstone Studios, Maidstone	UK	4.42	P Johnson	P Corbyn	NI	NI	NI	NI	NI
8 December	Channel 4 (everything but Brexit)	Leeds Beckett University, Leeds	UK	TBA	A	S Rayner	S Whitford	P Swinson	P Price	P Bartley	A
9 December	BBC (Question Time Under 30)	University of York, York	UK	TBA	S Jenrick	S Rayner	S Yousaf	P Swinson	P Price	P Bartley	P Farage
10 December	BBC Scotland	BBC Pacific Quay, Glasgow	Scotland	TBA	P Carlaw	P Leonard	P Sturgeon	P Rennie	NI	NI	NI

2019 United Kingdom general election debates in Northern Ireland
Date	Organisers	Venue	Viewing figures (millions)	P Present S Surrogate NI Not invited A Absent N No debate				
Date	Organisers	Venue	Viewing figures (millions)	DUP	SF	SDLP	UUP	APNI
8 December	UTV	Queen's Film Theatre, Belfast	TBA	S Little-Pengelly	P O'Neill	P Eastwood	P Aiken	P Long
10 December	BBC Northern Ireland	Broadcasting House, Belfast	TBA	S Donaldson	P O'Neill	P Eastwood	P Aiken	P Long

=== Campaign events ===
Before candidate nominations closed, several planned candidates for Labour and for the Conservatives withdrew, principally because of past social media activity. At least three Labour candidates and one Conservative candidate stood down, with two of the Labour candidates doing so following allegedly antisemitic remarks. Two other Conservative candidates were suspended from the Conservative Party over antisemitic social media posts, but retained their candidacy for the party. The Liberal Democrats removed one of its candidates over antisemitic social media posts, and defended two others.

Several former Labour MPs critical of Corbyn endorsed the Conservatives. Meanwhile, several former Conservative MPs, including former deputy prime minister Michael Heseltine, endorsed the Liberal Democrats and independent candidates. A week before election day, former Conservative prime minister John Major warned the public against enabling a majority Conservative government, to avoid what he saw as the damage a Johnson-led government could do to the country through Brexit. Major encouraged voters to vote tactically and to back former Conservative candidates instead of those put forward by the Conservative Party.

The 2019–20 United Kingdom floods started hitting parts of England from 7 to 18 November. Johnson was criticised for what some saw as his late response to the flooding, after he said they were not a national emergency. The Conservatives banned Daily Mirror reporters from Johnson's campaign bus. On 27 November, Labour announced it had obtained leaked government documents; they said these showed that the Conservatives were in trade negotiations with the US over the NHS. The Conservatives said Labour was peddling "conspiracy theories", with Dominic Raab later suggesting this was evidence of Russian interference in the election. The election also saw the 2019 London Bridge stabbing, a terrorist stabbing attack that occurred in London on 29 November; owing to this, the political parties suspended campaigning in London for a time.

The 2019 London summit of NATO was held in Watford on 3–4 December 2019. It was attended by 29 heads of state and heads of government, including then United States president Donald Trump. On 6 December, Labour announced it had obtained leaked government documents that they said showed that Johnson had misled the public about the Conservatives' Brexit deal with the EU, specifically regarding customs checks between Great Britain and Northern Ireland, which are part of the Good Friday Agreement and that Johnson had said would not exist.

=== Third-party campaigns ===
In February 2021, an investigation by openDemocracy found that third-party campaign groups "pushed anti-Labour attack ads to millions of voters ahead of the 2019 general election spent more than £700,000 without declaring any individual donation". These included Capitalist Worker and Campaign Against Corbynism, both of which were set up less than three months before the election and quickly disappeared thereafter. A further investigation, also reported by the Daily Mirror, found that a group run by Conservative activist Jennifer Powers had spent around £65,000 on dozens of advertisements attacking Corbyn and Labour on housing policy without declaring any donations.

During the campaign, i had reported that Powers was "a corporate lobbyist who is a former employee of the Conservative Party" and that her group had been one of "16 registrations completed since 5 November". Meanwhile, openDemocracy reported on the new phenomenon of United States-style, Super PAC-esque groups in British elections. Adam Ramsay, who wrote the article, contacted Powers and got her to admit to being an associate at the trade consultancy firm Competere, which was set up by lobbyist Shanker Singham, who works for the neoliberal think tank, the Institute for Economic Affairs. Powers' group "Right to Rent, Right to Buy, Right to Own" made claims that Labour wanted to "attack property rights in the UK" and "your mortgage will be harder to pay under Labour".

Additionally, openDemocracy reported that, during the election campaign, the pro-Labour group Momentum spent more than £500,000, the European Movement for the United Kingdom spent almost £300,000 and the anti-Brexit groups Led By Donkeys and Best for Britain spent £458,237 and more than one million pounds respectively. Following these reports, former Liberal Democrats MP Tom Brake, who lost his seat in the election and was now director of the pressure group Unlock Democracy, wrote to the Electoral Commission, urging them to investigate. These calls were echoed by John McDonnell, Labour MP and former Shadow Chancellor, who insisted that "a serious and in-depth inquiry into third-party campaigning" was needed.

== Religious groups' opinions on the parties ==
Many ethnic minority and religious leaders and organisations made statements about the general election. Leaders of the Church of England stated people had a "democratic duty to vote", that they should "leave their echo chambers", and "issues need to be debated respectfully, and without resorting to personal abuse".

Antisemitism in the Labour Party, especially new antisemitism was persistently covered in the media in the lead up to the election. In his leader's interview with Jeremy Corbyn, Andrew Neil dedicated the first third of the 30-minute programme entirely to discussion of Labour's relationship with the Jewish community. This interview drew attention as Corbyn refused to apologise for his handling of antisemitism in the Labour Party, despite having done so on previous occasions. The British chief rabbi Ephraim Mirvis made an unprecedented intervention in politics, warning that antisemitism was a "poison sanctioned from the top" of the Labour Party, and saying that British Jews were gripped by anxiety about the prospect of a Corbyn-led government. Justin Welby, the Archbishop of Canterbury, the Muslim Council of Britain and the Hindu Council UK supported Mirvis's intervention, if not entirely endorsing it. The Jewish Labour Movement said they would not be actively campaigning for Labour except for exceptional candidates. The pro-Corbyn Morning Star reported that Jewish Voice for Labour and the Jewish Socialist Group said that Mirvis did not represent all Jews, with some people within the religious groups being keen to express that no one person or organisation represents the views of all the members of the faith.

The Catholic Church in the United Kingdom urged voters to respect the right to life, opposing abortion, euthanasia, and assisted suicide, along with a peaceful solution to Brexit, support the poor, care for the homeless, and attention to human rights.

The Muslim Council of Britain (MCB) spokesman stated that Islamophobia "is particularly acute in the Conservative Party" and that Conservatives treat it "with denial, dismissal and deceit". In addition they released a 72-page document, outlining what they assess are the key issues from a British Muslim perspective. The MCB specifically criticised those who "seek to stigmatise and undermine Muslims"; for example, by implying that Pakistanis ("often used as a proxy for Muslims") vote "en bloc as directed by their imams". The Sunday Mirror stated that many of the candidates campaigning for the Brexit Party were Islamophobic. This scenario resulted in many Muslim individuals and organisations publicly endorsing the Labour Party.

The Times of India reported that supporters of Narendra Modi's ruling Bharatiya Janata Party (BJP) were actively campaigning for the Conservatives in 48 marginal seats, and the Today programme reported that it had seen WhatsApp messages sent to Hindus across the country urging them to vote Conservative. Some British Indians spoke out against what they saw as the BJP's meddling in the election. The Hindu Council UK was strongly critical of Labour, going as far as to say that Labour is "anti-Hindu", and objected to Corbyn's condemnation of the Indian government's actions resulting in the revocation of the special status of Jammu and Kashmir. Labour's perceived introduction of a white parachute candidate into Leicester East (where both the Conservatives and Liberal Democrats had fielded Hindu candidates) disappointed many with Hindu heritage (who had become the single largest ethnic group in Leicester); more specifically, no candidates of Indian descent were interviewed. Jeremy Corbyn was very unpopular among British Hindus due to his criticism of the Indian government and his past disparaging comments on the caste system, with many of the community seeing him to be under the influence of Pakistani Muslims, with whom he shared a common pro-Palestinian stance. The party selected or re-selected only one candidate of Indian descent among its 39 safest seats. Jeremy Corbyn receiving endorsement from the Jammu Kashmir Liberation Front, a Pakistan sponsored Islamist separatist group designated as a terrorist organisation by the Indian government known for forcibly expelling Kashmiri Hindus in the 1990s out of the Kashmir Valley, also made him unpopular with Hindus, especially those who migrated from Kashmir as a result of this incident.

== Endorsements ==
Newspapers, organisations, and individuals had endorsed parties or individual candidates for the election.

== Media coverage ==
=== Party representation ===
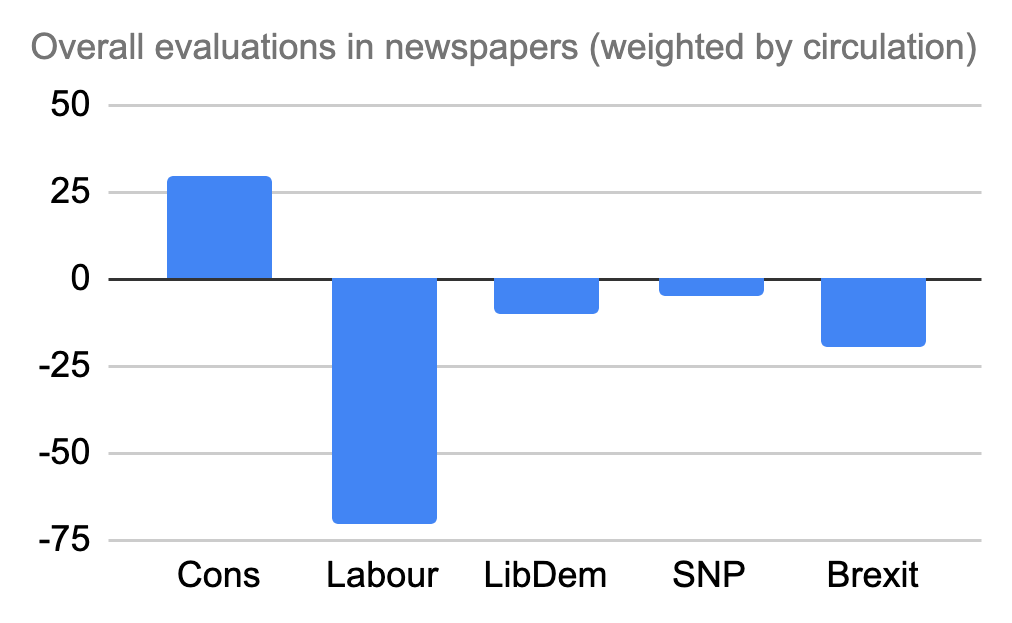
Overall evaluations in newspapers (weighted by circulation), 7–13 November 2019. The Conservatives were the only party with an overall positive coverage, while Labour had the most negative coverage.

According to Loughborough University's Centre for Research in Communication and Culture (CRCC), media coverage of the first week of the campaign was dominated by the Conservatives and Labour, with the leaders of both parties being the most represented campaigners (Johnson with 20.8%; Corbyn with 18.8%). Due to this, the election coverage was characterised as increasingly 'presidential' as smaller parties have been marginalised.

In television coverage, Boris Johnson had a particularly high-profile (30.4% against Corbyn's 22.6%). Labour (32%) and the Conservative Party (33%) received about a third of TV coverage each. In newspapers, Labour received two-fifths (40%) of the coverage and the Conservatives 35%. Spokespeople from both parties were quoted near equally, with Conservative sources being the most prominent in both press and TV coverage in terms of frequency of appearance. Sajid Javid and John McDonnell featured prominently during the first week because the economy of the United Kingdom was a top story for the media. McDonnell had more coverage than Javid on both TV and in print.

A large proportion of the newspaper coverage of Labour was negative. Writing in the British Journalism Review, James Hanning said that, in its leadership reporting and commentary, Conservative supporting newspapers made little mention of Johnson having "a track record that would have sunk any other politician". In the Loughborough analysis, during the first week of the campaign, for example, the Conservatives had a positive press coverage score of +29.7, making them the only party to receive a positive overall presentation in the press. Meanwhile, Labour had a negative score of −70, followed by the Brexit Party on −19.7 and the Liberal Democrats on −10. Over the whole campaign, press hostility towards Labour had doubled compared with during the 2017 election, and negative coverage of the Conservatives halved.

The Liberal Democrats were the party with the most TV coverage in the first week after Labour and the Conservatives, with an eighth of all reporting (13%). In newspapers, they received less coverage than the Brexit Party, whose leader Nigel Farage received nearly as much coverage (12.3%) as Johnson and Corbyn (17.4% each). Most of this coverage regarded the Brexit Party's proposed electoral pact with the Conservatives. The Brexit Party (7%) and the SNP (5%) were fourth and fifth in terms of TV coverage, respectively.

=== Dominant issues ===
As during the 2017 election and in line for British elections, the electoral process was the most covered media topic for this election at 31% of all coverage. Brexit was the most prominent policy issue on both TV (18%) and in the press (11%), followed by the economy, and health (8% and 7% of all coverage, respectively). Sky News referred to the election as "The Brexit Election", a strapline which Labour complained to Ofcom unduly favoured the Conservatives, a complaint that was rejected. There was little focused analysis of what the implementation of Brexit policies might mean, which contrasted with the more detailed analysis often undertaken of other manifesto commitments, such as those on the economy.

Wales, Scotland, and Northern Ireland's place within the United Kingdom received some prominence on TV but little coverage in the press. "Standards/scandals" and "Minorities/religion" received relatively significant discussion in large part relating to allegations of antisemitism in the Labour party and in the prior case an incident when Johnson was accused of reacting unsympathetically to an image of an ill child without a bed in hospital. Coverage of immigration and border controls fell overall from to 2017, while focus on environmental issues slightly increased.

=== Gender balance ===
Of the 20 most prominent spokespeople in media coverage of the first week of the election period, five were women, with Nicola Sturgeon, the SNP leader and first minister of Scotland, in seventh place, the most featured. Women including citizens, experts, pollsters, businesspeople, trade union representatives, and the like featured in 23.9% of coverage and men in 76.1%. Men spoke three times as much as women in TV coverage, and five times as much in newspaper coverage.

== Members of Parliament not standing for re-election ==
74 members of Parliament (MPs) who held seats at the end of Parliament did not stand for re-election. Of these, 32 were Conservative MPs, 20 were Labour, 3 were Liberal Democrats, and 16 were independents. The number of MPs retiring was higher than the 2017 general election, when 31 stood down. (Note: John Bercow stood down as an MP by being appointed steward of the Manor of Northstead before Parliament was dissolved.)

== Opinion polling ==
The chart below depicts the results of opinion polls, mostly only of voters in Great Britain, conducted from the 2017 general election until the election. The line plotted is the average of the last 15 polls and the larger circles at the end represent the actual results of the election. The graph shows that the Conservatives and Labour polled to similar levels from mid-2017 to mid-2019.

Following Johnson's election in July, the Conservatives established a clear lead over Labour, and simultaneously support for the Brexit Party declined from its peak in summer 2019. The Spreadex columns below cover bets on the number of seats each party would win, with the midpoint between asking and selling price.

Conservatives Labour Liberal Democrats SNP Greens UKIP Brexit Party Independent Group for Change

=== Predictions three weeks before the vote ===
The first-past-the-post system used in the United Kingdom general elections means that the number of seats won is not directly related to vote share. Thus, several approaches are used to convert polling data and other information into seat predictions. The table below lists some of the predictions.

Parties	Electoral Calculus as of 20 November 2019	Election Maps UK as of 17 November 2019	Elections Etc. as of 20 November 2019	BritainElects as of 20 November 2019
Conservatives	365	346	354	346
Labour Party	201	211	206	211
SNP	46	51	45	51
Liberal Democrats	15	18	25	24
Plaid Cymru	4	4	4	4
Green Party	1	1	1	1
Brexit Party	0	0	0	0
Others	18 (Note: DUP with 9, Sinn Féin with 7, and Alliance with 3)	19 (Note: DUP with 9, Sinn Féin with 6, SDLP with 2, and Alliance and speaker with 1)	18	18
Overall result (probability)	Conservative majority of 80	Conservative majority of 42	Conservative majority of 58	Conservative majority of 42

=== Predictions two weeks before the vote ===
Parties	Electoral Calculus as of 27 November 2019	Election Maps UK as of 28 November 2019	Elections Etc. as of 27 November 2019	YouGov as of 27 November 2019
Conservatives	342	338	353	359
Labour Party	224	226	208	211
SNP	41	45	44	43
Liberal Democrats	19	14	23	13
Plaid Cymru	4	5	4	4
Green Party	1	1	1	1
Brexit Party	0	0	0	0
Others	19 (Note: DUP with 8, Sinn Féin with 7, Alliance with 3, and speaker with 1)	19 (Note: DUP with 9, Sinn Féin with 6, SDLP with 2, and Alliance and speaker with 1)	19	19
Overall result	Conservative majority of 34	Conservative majority of 26	Conservative majority of 56	Conservative majority of 68

Note: Elections Etc. does not add up to 650 seats due to rounding, the speaker is shown under "Others" and not "Labour", and majority figures assume all elected members take up their seats.

=== Predictions one week before the vote ===
Below are listed predictions based upon polls.

Parties	Electoral Calculus as of 8 December 2019	Election Maps UK as of 6 December 2019	Elections Etc. as of 5 December 2019	UK-Elect as of 8 December 2019	Graphnile as of 11 December 2019	Spreadex as of 5 December 2019
Conservatives	348	345	346	354	352	341
Labour Party	225	224	218	212	221	220
SNP	41	43	45	43	52	44.5
Liberal Democrats	13	14	19	17	N/A	21
Plaid Cymru	4	4	4	4	N/A	4
Green Party	1	1	1	1	N/A	1.5
Brexit Party	0	0	0	0	N/A	1.75
Others	19	19 (Note: DUP with 8, Sinn Féin with 7, SDLP with 2, and Alliance and speaker with 1)	19 (Note: DUP with 9, Sinn Féin with 6, SDLP with 2, and Alliance and speaker with one)	19 (Note: Speaker with one, uses 2017 NI results for forecasting)	25	N/A
Overall result	Conservative majority of 46	Conservative majority of 40	Conservative majority of 42	Conservative majority of 58	Conservative majority of 56	Conservative majority of 32

Note: Elections Etc. does not add up to 650 seats due to rounding, the speaker is shown under "Others" and not "Labour", and majority figures assume all elected members take up their seats.

Below are listed predictions based upon betting odds, assuming the favourite wins in each constituency.

Parties	Oddschecker
Conservatives	351
Labour Party	210
SNP	44
Liberal Democrats	18
Plaid Cymru	4
Green Party	1
Brexit Party	0
Others	19 (Note: DUP with 9, Sinn Féin with 7, SDLP with 2, and Alliance and speaker with one)
Too close to call	3
Overall result	Conservative majority of 52

Note: The speaker is shown under "Others" and not "Labour", and majority figures assume all elected members take up their seats.

=== Final predictions ===
Parties	YouGov as of 10 December 2019	Electoral Calculus as of 12 December 2019	Election Maps UK as of 12 December 2019	Elections Etc. as of 12 December 2019	UK-Elect as of 11 December 2019	Spreadex as of 11 December 2019
Conservatives	339	351	344	341	348	340
Labour Party	231	224	223	224	217	222
SNP	41	41	45	43	44	43
Liberal Democrats	15	13	14	19	17	21
Plaid Cymru	4	2	4	4	4	4
Green Party	1	1	1	1	1	1.5
Brexit Party	0	0	0	1	0	1
Others	19	18 (Note: DUP with 10, Sinn Féin with 6, and SDLP with 2)	18 (Note: DUP with 10, Sinn Féin with 6, and SDLP with 2)	19	19 (Note: DUP with 10, Sinn Féin with 7, and others with 2)	N/A
Overall result	Conservative majority of 28	Conservative majority of 52	Conservative majority of 38	Conservative majority of 32	Conservative majority of 46	Conservative majority of 30

=== Exit poll ===
An exit poll conducted by Ipsos MORI for the BBC, ITV, and Sky News was published at the end of voting at 10 pm, predicting the number of seats for each party.

Parties	Seats	Change
Conservative Party	368	▲51
Labour Party	191	▼71
Scottish National Party	55	▲20
Liberal Democrats	13	▲1
Plaid Cymru	3	▼1
Green Party	1	Steady
Brexit Party	0	New
Others	19	Steady
Conservative majority of 86

== Results ==
Result by countries and English regions

Equal-area projection of constituencies

Constituencies gained in the 2019 general election (animated version)

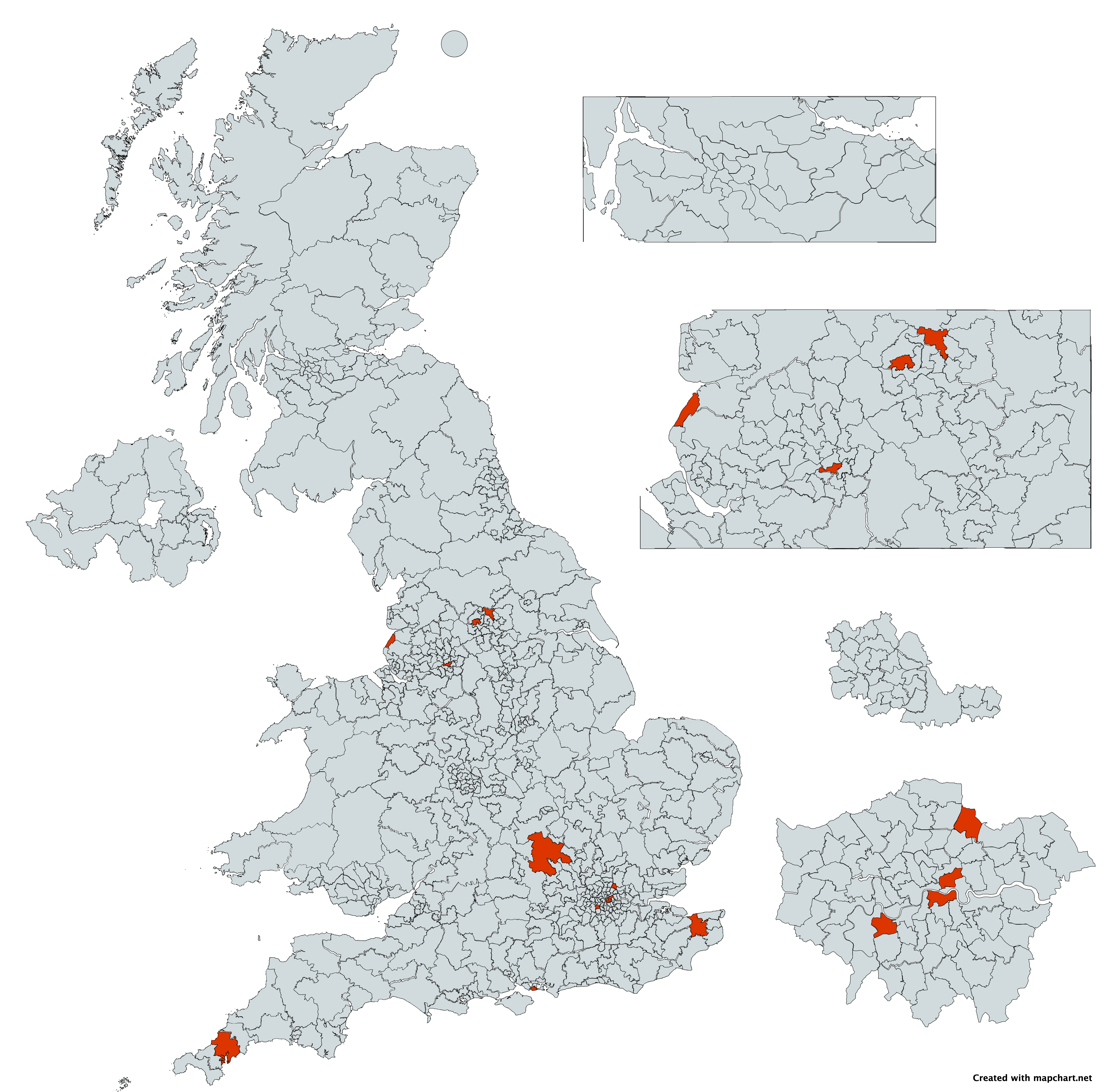
A map detailing constituencies in which the Labour Party gained in vote percentage in the 2019 general election

The Conservative Party won, securing 365 seats out of 650, giving them an overall majority of 80 seats in the House of Commons. They gained seats in several Labour Party strongholds in Northern England that had been held by the party for decades and which had formed the red wall; for instance, the constituency of Bishop Auckland, which elected a Conservative MP for the first time in its 134-year history. This marked a fourth consecutive general election defeat for the Labour Party. In the worst result for the party in 84 years, despite a better vote share than other losses as in 1931, 1983, 1987, and 2010, Labour won 202 seats, which was the lowest number since 1935 and a loss of 60 compared to the previous election.

The Liberal Democrats won 11 seats, down 1, despite significantly increasing their share of the popular vote. Ed Davey, former Cameron–Clegg coalition cabinet minister and MP for Kingston and Surbiton, was the winner of the 2020 Liberal Democrats leadership election. This came after Jo Swinson lost her seat to Amy Callaghan of the SNP by 150 votes and was disqualified from continuing as leader of the party. Swinson also became the first party leader to lose their seat since Liberal Party leader Archibald Sinclair in 1945.

While the Conservatives gained support in England and Wales, they lost support in Scotland in the face of a major SNP advance. The Conservatives won in England, advancing by 1.7% and gaining 48 seats to win 345 out of 533, while Labour fell back by 8% and lost 47 seats to win just 180. Labour won in Wales but lost 8% of its 2017 vote share and six seats, retaining 22 out of 40, while the Conservatives advanced by 2.5% and gained six seats, winning 14 in total.

The SNP advanced by 8.1% and gained 13 seats to win 48 out of 59, gaining several seats from the Conservatives and Labour. The Conservatives lost 3.5% of their 2017 vote share and half their seats, while Labour was reduced to one Scottish seat, Edinburgh South. This is the same Scottish seat that returned Ian Murray in the 2015–17 Parliament as the country's sole Labour MP. Among the Labour MPs who lost their seats in Scotland was Lesley Laird, deputy leader of Scottish Labour and Shadow Secretary of State for Scotland. In Northern Ireland, nationalist political parties won more seats than unionist ones for the first time. Nigel Dodds, the DUP's leader in Westminster, lost his seat in Belfast North.

=== Analysis ===
The results have been attributed to Leave-supporting areas backing the Conservatives, the Conservatives broadening their appeal to working-class voters, and the Conservatives making gains in the Midlands and the north of England. Most notable was the red wall turning blue in the election, which greatly contributed to the Conservative majority. In exit polls conducted by Opinium, 43% of voters who did not vote for the Labour Party cited 'the leadership' as their reason. Among those who did not vote for the Conservative Party, the cited reason was equally split between 'their stance on Brexit' and 'the leadership', with both at 26%. Several commentators stated that the party's loss was due to a complicated manifesto and Brexit policy, a poor approach to campaigning, and the unpopularity of Corbyn's leadership.

A YouGov post-election survey determined that the age over which voters were more likely to opt for the Conservatives than for Labour was 39, down from 47 in the 2017 election. In contrast to previous elections, the YouGov survey additionally found that a plurality of voters in the DE's NRS social grade — comprising the unemployed, state pensioners, and semi-skilled and unskilled workers — had opted for the Conservatives over Labour. This change reflects the collapse of the 'Red Wall' which has a plurality of people in the DE classification according to the ONS.

Between 26% and 33% of voters engaged in tactical voting, as they said that they were trying to prevent a victory by the party they liked least. Recommendation by tactical voting websites had some benefit for Liberal Democrat candidates. The new Parliament reportedly had the highest number of openly LGBT MPs in the world, with 20 Conservative MPs, 15 Labour MPs, and 10 SNP MPs who identify as LGBT. For the first time in both cases, the majority of elected Labour and Liberal Democrat MPs were female. The election also returned a record number of Black, Asian and Minority Ethnic (BAME) MPs, with 65 MPs (10%) describing themselves as BAME.

In a post-election review featuring Labour MPs, trade union officials and activists one of several reasons attributed to the electoral defeat was due to the declining popularity of Jeremy Corbyn in relation to the Brexit position and allegations of new antisemitism. The review projected that Labour would have retained 38% of the vote had Corbyn's popularity levels retained at its peak level in 2017.

=== Summary ===

A summarised results of the parties that won seats at the election is shown below.

Party	Leader	MPs		Votes	
Party	Leader		Of total		Of total
Conservative Party	Boris Johnson	365	56.2%	13,966,454	43.6%
Labour Party	Jeremy Corbyn	202	31.1%	10,269,051	32.1%
Scottish National Party	Nicola Sturgeon	48	7.4%	1,242,380	3.9%
Liberal Democrats	Jo Swinson	11	1.7%	3,696,419	11.6%
Democratic Unionist Party	Arlene Foster	8	1.2%	244,128	0.8%
Sinn Féin	Mary Lou McDonald	7	1.1%	181,853	0.6%
Plaid Cymru	Adam Price	4	0.6%	153,265	0.5%
Social Democratic and Labour Party	Colum Eastwood	2	0.3%	118,737	0.4%
Green Party of England and Wales	Jonathan Bartley; Siân Berry	1	0.2%	835,597	2.61%
Alliance Party of Northern Ireland	Naomi Long	1	0.2%	134,115	0.4%
Speaker	Lindsay Hoyle	1	0.2%	26,831	0.1%

=== Full results ===
Results of the December 2019 general election to the House of Commons of the United Kingdom
Political party	Leader	Candidates	MPs					Votes		
Political party	Leader	Candidates	Total	Gained	Lost	Net	Of total (%)	Total	Of total (%)	Change (%)
Conservative	Boris Johnson	635	365	58	10	▲48	56.2	13,966,454	43.63	+1.2
Labour	Jeremy Corbyn	631 (Note: Includes 50 Co-operative Party candidates, as part of the Labour-Co-op alliance)	202 (Note: Includes 26 Co-operative Party MPs, as part of the Labour-Co-op alliance)	1	61 (Note: Includes 12 Co-operative Party MPs, as part of the Labour-Co-op alliance)	▼60 (Note: Includes -12 Co-operative Party MPs, as part of the Labour-Co-op alliance)	31.1 (Note: Includes 4.0% for the Co-operative Party, as part of the Labour-Co-op alliance)	10,269,051 (Note: Includes 1,025,882 for the Co-operative Party, as part of the Labour-Co-op alliance)	32.08 (Note: Includes 3.2% for the Co-operative Party, as part of the Labour-Co-op alliance)	−7.9 (Note: Includes -1.0% for the Co-operative Party, as part of the Labour-Co-op alliance)
Liberal Democrats	Jo Swinson	611	11	3	4	▼1	1.7	3,696,419	11.55	+4.2
Scottish National Party	Nicola Sturgeon	59	48	14	1	▲13	7.4	1,242,380	3.88	+0.8
Green Party of England and Wales	Siân Berry and Jonathan Bartley	472	1	0	0	0	0.2	835,597	2.61	+1.1
Brexit Party	Nigel Farage	275						644,257	2.01	
DUP	Arlene Foster	17	8	0	2	▼2	1.2	244,128	0.76	−0.1
Sinn Féin	Mary Lou McDonald	15	7	1	1	0	1.1	181,853	0.57	−0.2
Plaid Cymru	Adam Price	36	4	0	0	0	0.6	153,265	0.48	0.0
Alliance	Naomi Long	18	1	1	0	▲1	0.2	134,115	0.42	+0.2
SDLP	Colum Eastwood	15	2	2	0	▲2	0.3	118,737	0.37	+0.1
UUP	Steve Aiken	16						93,123	0.29	0.0
Yorkshire	Christopher Whitwood	28						29,201	0.09	0.0
Scottish Greens	Patrick Harvie & Lorna Slater	22						28,122	0.09	
Speaker	Lindsay Hoyle	1	1	1	1	0	0.2	26,831	0.08	0.0
UKIP	Patricia Mountain (interim)	44						22,817	0.07	−1.8
Ashfield Ind.	Jason Zadrozny	1						13,498	0.04	0.0
Liberal	Steve Radford	19						10,876	0.03	0.0
The Independent Group for Change	Anna Soubry	3						10,006	0.03	
Aontú	Peadar Tóibín	7						9,814	0.03	
Monster Raving Loony	Howling Laud Hope	24						9,739	0.03	0.0
People Before Profit	Collective	2						7,526	0.02	
Birkenhead Social Justice	Frank Field	1						7,285	0.02	
CPA	Sidney Cordle	29						6,486	0.02	0.0
Heavy Woollen Independents	Aleksandar Lukic	1						6,432	0.02	
SDP	William Clouston	20						3,295	0.01	0.0
Animal Welfare	Vanessa Hudson	6						3,086	0.01	0.0
North East	Mark Burdon	2						2,637	0.01	
Lincolnshire Independent	Marianne Overton	1						1,999	0.01	
Green Party Northern Ireland	Clare Bailey	3						1,996	0.01	
English Democrat	Robin Tilbrook	5						1,987	0.01	0.0
Libertarian	Adam Brown	6						1,780	0.01	0.0
Mebyon Kernow	Dick Cole	1						1,660	0.01	0.0
Proud of Oldham and Saddleworth	Paul Errock	2						1,606	0.01	
Independent Network	Ian Stephens	1						1,542	0.0	
Gwlad	Gwyn Wigley Evans	3						1,515	0.00	
Cynon Valley	Andrew Chainey	1						1,322	0.00	
VPP	Robin Horsfall	2						1,219	0.00	
Burnley and Padiham Party	Mark Payne	1						1,162	0.00	
Shropshire Party	Robert Jones	1						1,141	0.00	
Putting Cumbria First	Jonathan Davies	1						1,070	0.00	
Peace	John Morris	2						960	0.00	
Wycombe Independents	Matt Knight	1						926	0.00	
JAC	Donald Jerrard	3						728	0.00	
Christian	Jeff Green	2						705	0.00	0.0
Renew	Julie Girling	4						545	0.00	0.0
Workers Revolutionary	Joshua Ogunleye	5						524	0.00	0.0
BNP	Adam Walker	1						510	0.00	0.0
Parties with fewer than 500 votes each		40						5,697	0.02	
Independent (non-party) candidates		224			1	▼1		206,486	0.64	
Blank and invalid votes								117,919	—	—
Total		3320	650			0	100	32,014,110	100	0.0
Registered voters, and turnout								47,587,254	67.52	−1.3

In total, the Green Party of England and Wales, Scottish Greens, and Green Party Northern Ireland received 865,715 votes (2.70%). This may be unclear from the table and sources which cite the total of the Greens in the whole of the United Kingdom rather than by region.

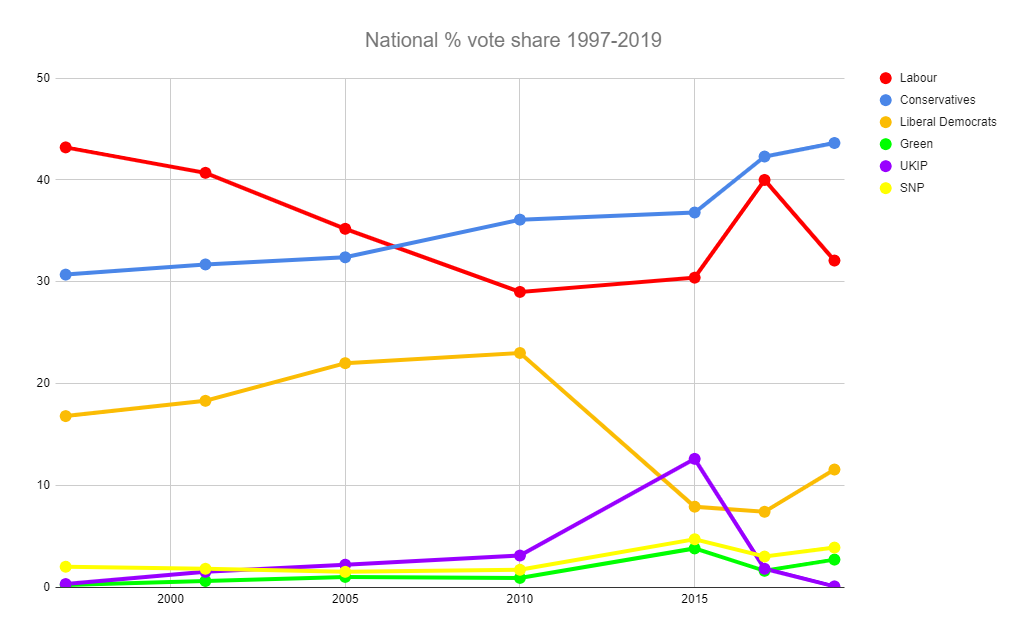
National vote share as a percentage between 1997 and 2019

Seats won in the election (outer ring) against number of votes (inner ring)

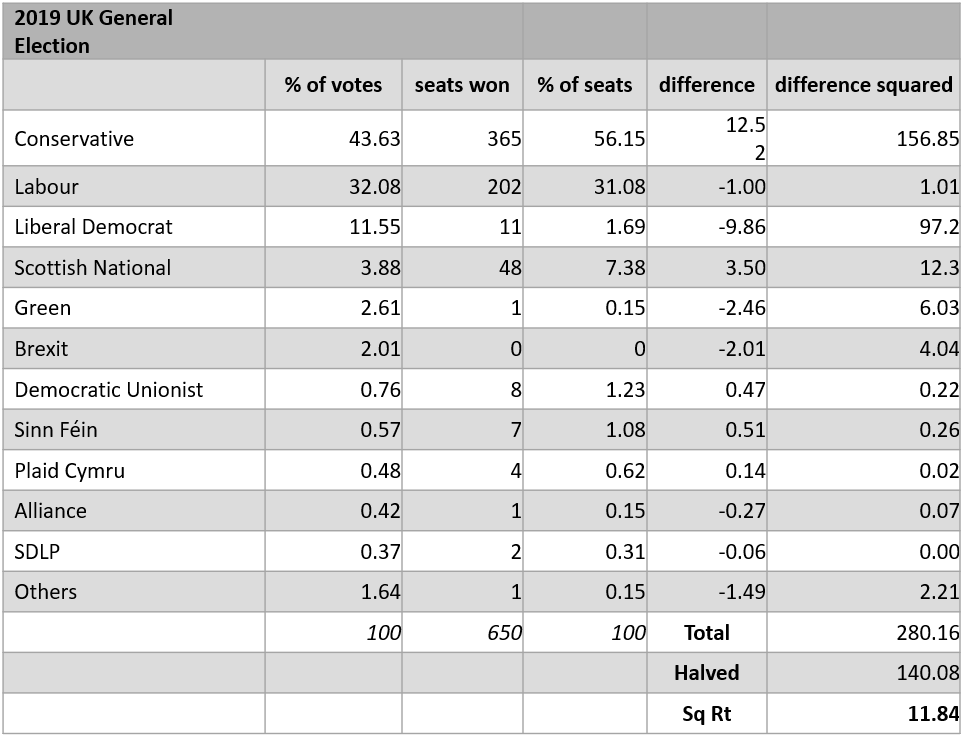
The parliamentary disproportionality in the 2019 election was 11.84 using the Gallagher Index.

Vote share
Conservative	43.6%
Labour	32.2%
Liberal Democrat	11.6%
Scottish National	3.9%
Green	2.7%
Brexit Party	2.0%
Democratic Unionist	0.8%
Sinn Féin	0.6%
Plaid Cymru	0.5%
SDLP	0.4%
Others	1.4%

Vote share of seats contested
Scottish National	45.5%
Conservative	44.9%
Labour	33.0%
Democratic Unionist	32.6%
Sinn Féin	27.2%
SDLP	17.8%
Liberal Democrat	12.3%
Plaid Cymru	11.2%
Brexit Party	5.1%
Green	3.4%

Parliamentary seats
Conservative	56.2%
Labour	31.1%
Scottish National	7.4%
Liberal Democrat	1.7%
Democratic Unionist	1.2%
Sinn Féin	1.1%
Plaid Cymru	0.6%
SDLP	0.3%
Green	0.2%
Alliance	0.2%
Speaker	0.2%

Parliamentary seats out of total contested
Scottish National	81.4%
Conservative	57.5%
Democratic Unionist	47.1%
Sinn Féin	46.7%
Labour	32.0%
SDLP	13.3%
Plaid Cymru	11.1%
Alliance	5.6%
Liberal Democrat	1.8%
Green	0.2%

=== Voter demographics ===
==== Ipsos MORI ====
Below is listed Ipsos MORI's demographic breakdown.

The 2019 UK general election vote in Great Britain
Social group	% Con	% Lab	% Lib Dem	% Others	% Lead
Total vote	45	33	12	10	12
Gender
Male	46	31	12	11	15
Female	43	34	12	11	9
Age
18–24	19	62	9	10	43
25–34	27	51	11	11	24
35–44	36	39	13	12	3
45–54	46	28	14	12	18
55–64	49	27	11	13	22
65+	64	17	11	8	47
Men by age
18–24	22	59	10	9	37
25–34	31	48	10	11	17
35–54	45	30	14	11	15
55+	58	21	11	10	37
Women by age
18–24	17	64	9	10	47
25–34	23	54	12	11	31
35–54	37	36	14	13	1
55+	59	21	12	8	38
Social class
AB	45	30	16	9	15
C1	45	32	12	11	13
C2	47	32	9	12	15
DE	41	39	9	11	2
Men by social class
AB	47	29	15	9	18
C1	47	31	12	10	16
C2	48	30	8	14	18
DE	43	37	8	12	6
Women by social class
AB	43	31	17	10	11
C1	44	33	13	10	11
C2	46	33	9	12	13
DE	39	40	9	12	1
Housing tenure
Owned	57	22	12	9	35
Mortgage	43	33	14	10	10
Social renter	33	45	7	15	12
Private renter	31	46	11	12	15
Ethnic group
White	48	29	12	11	19
BME	20	64	12	4	44
Qualifications
No qualifications	59	23	7	11	36
Other qualifications	47	33	10	10	14
Degree or higher	34	39	17	10	5
EU referendum vote
Remain	20	48	21	11	28
Leave	73	15	3	9	58
Did not vote	26	52	10	12	26
2017 general election vote
Conservative	88	3	6	3	85
Labour	8	80	8	4	72
Lib Dem	11	19	63	7	44
Did not vote	33	46	9	12	13
Aged 18–34 by social class
AB	26	52	13	9	26
C1	24	55	10	11	31
C2	27	51	9	13	24
DE	18	63	8	11	45
Aged 35–54 by social class
AB	42	29	20	9	13
C1	44	32	13	11	12
C2	44	31	10	15	13
DE	35	42	9	14	7
Aged 55+ by social class
AB	60	17	14	9	43
C1	59	20	13	8	39
C2	61	21	8	10	40
DE	53	26	9	12	27

==== YouGov ====
Below is listed YouGov's demographic breakdown.

2019 UK general election vote in Great Britain (demographic breakdown)
Social group	Con %	Lab %	Lib Dem %	SNP %	Green %	Brexit %	Others %	Lead %
Total vote	44	32	12	4	3	2	3	12
Gender
Male	46	31	12	4	3	2	2	15
Female	44	35	11	4	3	2	1	9
Age
18–24	21	56	11	6	4	1	1	35
25–29	23	54	12	4	4	1	1	31
30–39	30	46	14	5	3	1	2	16
40–49	41	35	13	5	3	2	2	6
50–59	49	28	12	4	3	3	2	21
60–69	57	22	11	3	2	3	2	35
70+	67	14	11	2	2	2	2	53
Men by age
18–24	28	46	12	7	4	2	2	18
25–49	35	40	14	5	3	2	2	15
50–64	51	28	12	3	3	4	3	23
65+	64	15	11	3	1	4	2	49
Women by age
18–24	15	65	10	5	4	–	1	50
25–49	32	45	12	5	3	1	1	13
50–64	50	28	12	4	3	2	1	22
65+	64	18	10	2	2	2	2	46
Social class
AB	42	32	16	4	3	1	1	10
C1	43	34	12	4	3	2	2	9
C2	49	31	9	4	3	3	1	18
DE	47	34	8	4	2	3	1	13
Highest educational level
GCSE or lower	58	25	11	4	2	3	1	33
Medium	48	31	11	4	3	2	2	17
High (degree or above)	29	43	17	4	4	1	2	14
Household earnings
Less than £20,000	45	34	9	5	3	3	4	11
£20,000–39,999	47	31	11	4	2	2	3	16
£40,000–69,999	43	35	13	4	3	1	1	8
Greater than £70,000	40	31	20	4	3	1	1	9

== Seats changing hands ==
=== Seats which changed allegiance ===
Labour to Conservative (54)

- Ashfield
- Barrow and Furness
- Bassetlaw
- Birmingham Northfield
- Bishop Auckland
- Blackpool South
- Blyth Valley
- Bolsover
- Bolton North East
- Bridgend
- Burnley
- Bury North
- Bury South
- Clwyd South
- Colne Valley
- Crewe and Nantwich
- Darlington
- Delyn
- Derby North
- Dewsbury
- Don Valley
- Dudley North
- Gedling
- Great Grimsby
- Heywood and Middleton
- High Peak
- Hyndburn
- Ipswich
- Keighley
- Kensington
- Leigh
- Lincoln
- Newcastle-under-Lyme
- North West Durham
- Penistone and Stocksbridge
- Peterborough
- Redcar
- Rother Valley
- Scunthorpe
- Sedgefield
- Stockton South
- Stoke-on-Trent Central
- Stoke-on-Trent North
- Stroud
- Vale of Clwyd
- Wakefield
- Warrington South
- West Bromwich East
- West Bromwich West
- Wolverhampton North East
- Wolverhampton South West
- Workington
- Wrexham
- Ynys Môn

Conservative to SNP (7)

- Aberdeen South
- Angus
- Ayr, Carrick and Cumnock
- East Renfrewshire
- Gordon
- Ochil and South Perthshire
- Stirling

Labour to SNP (6)

- Coatbridge, Chryston and Bellshill
- East Lothian
- Glasgow North East
- Kirkcaldy and Cowdenbeath
- Midlothian
- Rutherglen and Hamilton West

Liberal Democrat to Conservative (3)

- Carshalton and Wallington
- Eastbourne
- North Norfolk

Conservative to Liberal Democrat (2)

- Richmond Park
- St Albans

DUP to Sinn Féin (1)

- Belfast North

DUP to SDLP (1)

- Belfast South

Speaker to Conservative (1)

- Buckingham

Labour to Speaker (1)

- Chorley

Liberal Democrat to SNP (1)

- East Dunbartonshire

Sinn Féin to SDLP (1)

- Foyle

Independent to Alliance (1)

- North Down

SNP to Liberal Democrat (1)

- North East Fife

Conservative to Labour (1)

- Putney

== Reaction and aftermath ==
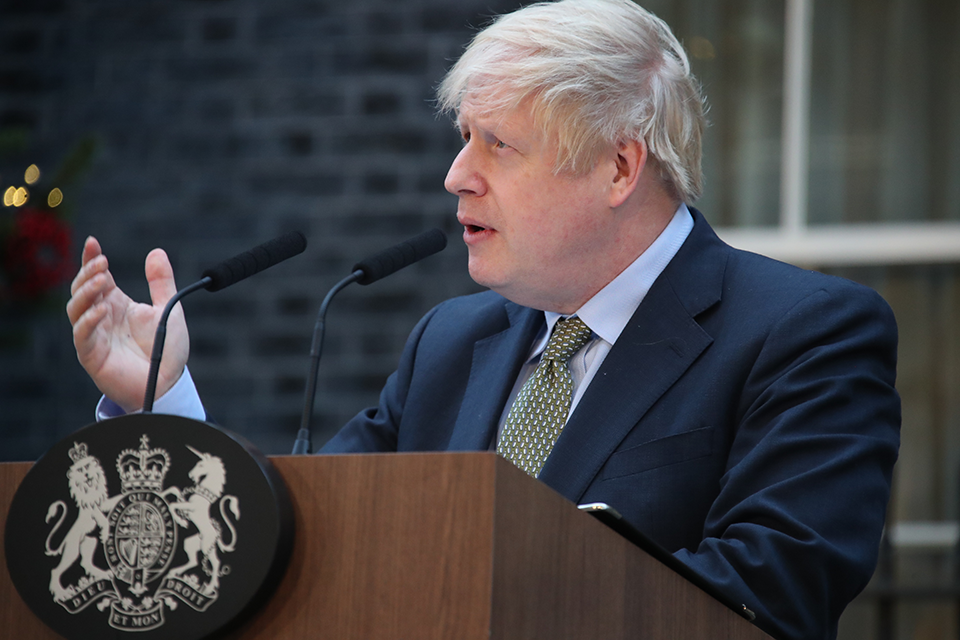
Boris Johnson making first statement outside 10 Downing Street following the election

In his victory speech, Johnson described the result as a mandate for leaving the EU and promised to do so by 31 January. The United Kingdom left the EU on 31 January 2020 but continued using EU trading rules until 23:00 on 31 December.

The election led to both Labour and the Liberal Democrats having leadership contests: the former as Corbyn resigned, the latter as Swinson failed to be elected as an MP. Corbyn portrayed the 2019 election results primarily as a consequence of attitudes surrounding Brexit rather than a rejection of Labour's social and economic policies. In an interview held on 13 December 2019, Corbyn said the election was "taken over ultimately by Brexit", and said that he was "proud of the [Labour] manifesto".

The Labour leadership campaign was marked by conflicting analyses of what had gone wrong for the party in the general election. There was debate as to whether Corbyn's unpopularity or their position on Brexit was more significant. The 2020 Labour Together report, published by internal Labour party figures after Keir Starmer was elected as leader, highlighted issues like Corbyn's unpopularity, the party's Brexit policy, and poor seat targeting, as well as long-term changes in Labour's electoral coalition. In openDemocracy, Jo Michell and Rob Calvert Jump argued that the report underplayed the effect of the geographical redistributions, stating that "Labour's decline in the North, Midlands and Wales is not the result of a dramatic collapse in its vote share, but changes in the distribution of votes between parties and constituencies."

Successful Liberal Democrats MPs were critical in private of how the party had decided to advocate revoking the exercise of Article 50, and the communication of that policy. Some criticised the election campaign for being hubristic, with its initial defining message that Swinson could be the country's next prime minister. Ed Davey, the party's co-acting leader after the election, argued that the unpopularity of Corbyn lost the Liberal Democrats votes to the Conservatives. Wera Hobhouse, who was re-elected by a majority of 12,322, argued that the party had been wrong to pursue a policy of equidistance between Labour and the Conservatives in the general election campaign. Instead, she argued that the party should have concentrated more on campaigning against the Conservatives. The SNP's leader Nicola Sturgeon described the result as a clear mandate to hold a new referendum for Scottish independence. The British government said that it would not agree to a referendum being held and the Scottish government announced a few months later that it would put the issue on hold due to the COVID-19 pandemic in the United Kingdom.

== See also ==
- 2010s in United Kingdom political history
- 2019 in politics and government
- 2019 United Kingdom general election in England
- 2019 United Kingdom general election in Scotland
- 2019 United Kingdom general election in Wales
- 2019 United Kingdom general election in Northern Ireland
- Elections in the United Kingdom
- List of United Kingdom general elections
