= North High School (Phoenix, Arizona) =

Public secondary school

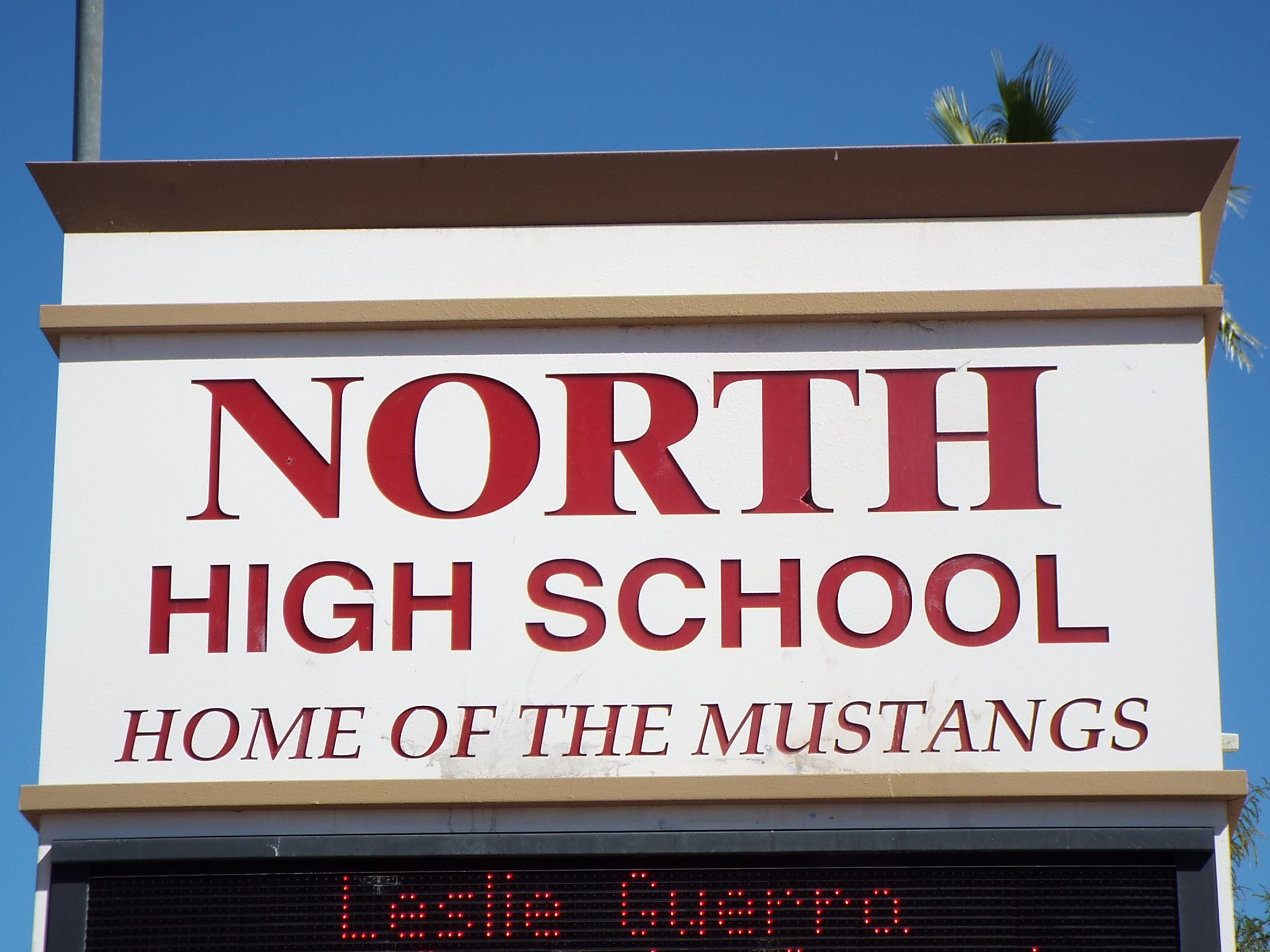

Location
- 1101 East Thomas Road; Phoenix, Arizona 85014; United States; 33°28′47″N 112°03′29″W

Information
- Type: Public secondary school
- Motto: Empowering all students to be global citizens as they pursue success.
- Established: 1939; 87 years ago (Initial); 1983; 43 years ago (reopening)
- Status: Operational
- Closed: 1981; 45 years ago (Initial)
- School district: Phoenix Union High School District
- NCES District ID: 0406330
- NCES School ID: 040633001244
- Principal: Jamie Johnston
- Teaching staff: 101.00 (FTE)
- Grades: 9-12
- Enrollment: 1,902 (2023-2024)
- Student to teacher ratio: 18.83
- Colors: Blue and Red
- Mascot: Mustang
- Website: www.pxu.org/o/nhs

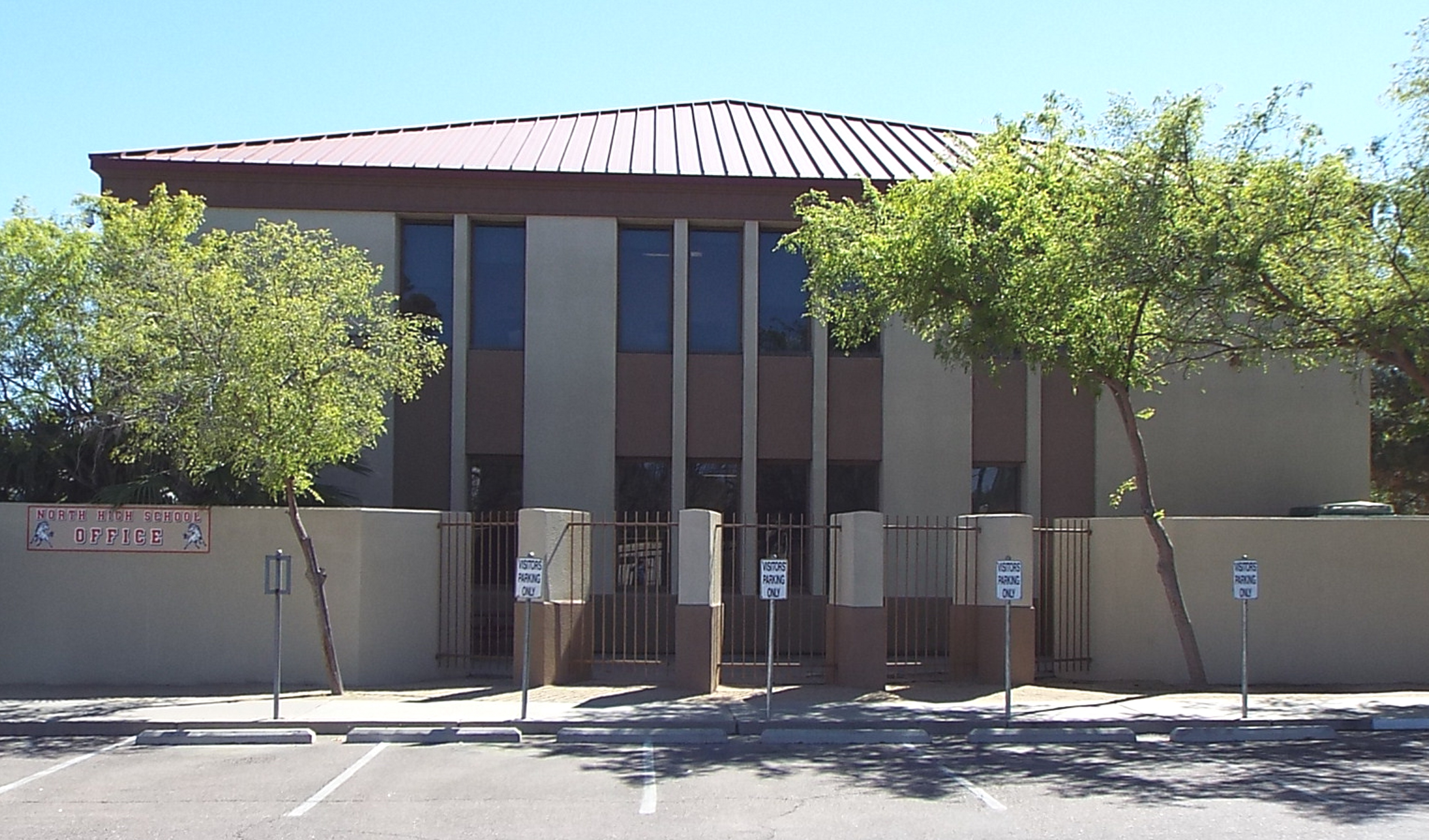
The original building built in 1939, of the once North Phoenix High School, now North High School (1954)

North High School (Formerly known as North Phoenix High School) is a high school that forms part of the Phoenix Union High School District in Phoenix, Arizona.

== History ==
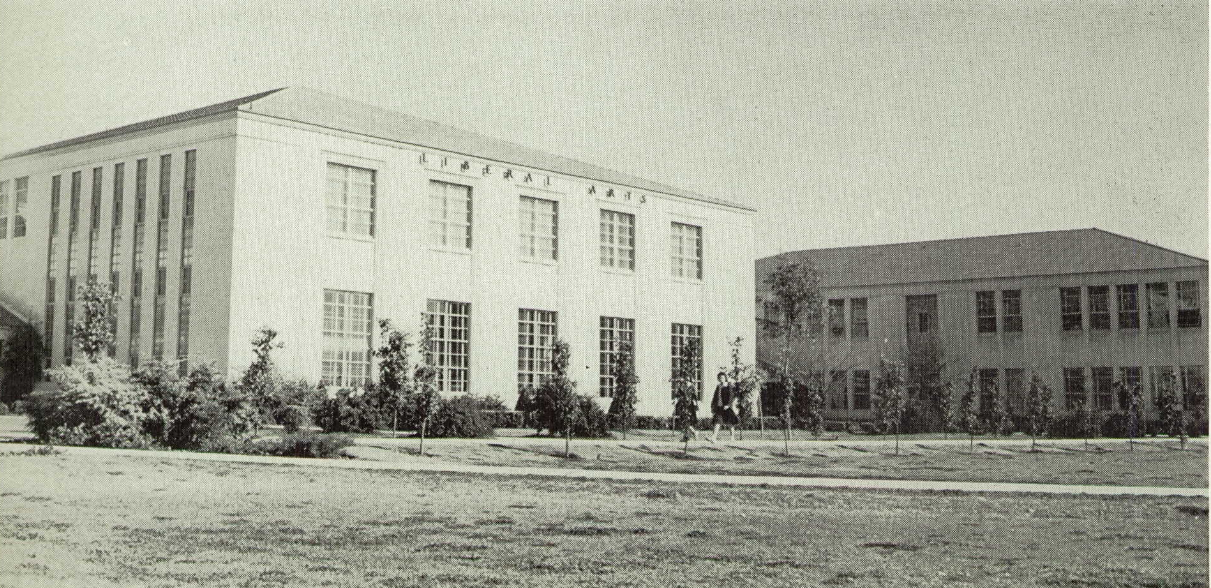
North High School in 1942

North Phoenix High School opened its doors in 1939, becoming the first high school built after George Washington Carver High School, a school that was built for segregation purposes.

=== Closure ===
By 1981, the school's enrollment had fallen to 814. As a result, North High was closed in 1981, and would become one of four Phoenix high schools to close during the 1980s. As a result of the closures, two lawsuits were filed, accusing the Phoenix Union High School District of discriminating against ethnic minorities and low-income students by closing schools in their neighborhoods, in addition to unfair resource allocations. The lawsuits were later consolidated into the Castro v. Phoenix Union High School District lawsuit, in which a federal judge ruled against the school district. That ruling resulted in the reopening of North High, as well as, among other measures, the establishment of magnet programs across the district.

Phoenix Union High School District's website makes no reference to the controversy surrounding the school's closure and eventual reopening, merely stating that the school closed, due to declining enrollment, and later reopened.

=== Reopening ===
The school reopened in 1983, and in 1984, 875 students were enrolled at the school.

== Campus ==
The school's campus was built using funds from the Works Progress Administration and Public Works Administration, both established as part of the New Deal.

The school is noted for having built-in lockers in the hallways, at a time when every other school within the Phoenix Union High School District has removed theirs. Film and commercial producers have said the school reminds people of a traditional high school.

The school's football field contains lattice tower light poles and a concrete grandstand.

== In popular culture ==
The 1996 movie No One Would Tell was filmed on the school's campus.

Charles Barkley filmed his "I am not a role model" commercial for Nike at the school's gymnasium.

== Notable alumni ==
- Rebecca White Berch – Chief Justice, Arizona Supreme Court
- Gil Blanco – professional baseball player
- Evelyne Bradley – Former Navajo Nation district judge
- Michael Bruce – Alice Cooper band member, inducted into the Rock N' Roll Hall of Fame in 2010
- Ed Buck – Democratic political activist, fundraiser, and convicted felon
- Samuel Burke – CNN correspondent
- Eldridge Wayne Coleman – professional wrestling champion "Superstar" Billy Graham
- Joan Ganz Cooney – creator/producer, Sesame Street
- George Flint – professional football player
- Don Nicholas – professional baseball player
- Abdihamid Nur – World Championships distance runner and NCAA record holder
- Beverly Garland – actress
- John Howard Lindauer – Republican candidate for governor of Alaska in 1998
- Dallas Long, Jr. – Olympic shot putter
- Wayne Newton – entertainer
- Terry Peder Rasmussen – serial killer
- Meg Sneed – LGBT / civil rights activist
- Alan Williams – NBA basketball player
- Gordie Windhorn – professional baseball player
- Tito Torbellino - Professional Musician
