= Samuel Burke =

American news correspondent

- Samuel Burke at the 2015 Philadelphia train crash site
- Born: 1985 or 1986 (age 40–41)
- Education: The Cronkite School
- Occupations: CNN reporter and anchor (2009–2019)
- Years active: 2009–present

Samuel Burke (born 1985/1986) is a business and technology correspondent who has anchored programs on both CNN International and CNN en Español. He is host of the CNN series "Suddenly Family - DNA Discoveries with Samuel Burke." He's also hosted the program iReport in English and the Cyber Café daily on the Spanish-language morning program CafeCNN. Previously, he served as producer for war correspondent Christiane Amanpour. In 2014, he won an Outstanding Entertainment Program Emmy Award for his reports on the technology show CLIX. In 2016, he won the Daytime Emmy for Outstanding Morning Program for his role hosting Café CNN.

== Early life and education ==
Samuel Burke was born and raised in Phoenix, Arizona to a Greek Sephardic Jewish family. He learned to speak Spanish at a young age, travelling to Mexico frequently as a child and spending summers in Mexico at a language college as a teenager. Burke attended Phoenix's North High School and in 2003 he was a member of the United States House of Representatives Page Program after he was nominated by Congressman Ed Pastor.

Burke attended the Arizona State University, graduating with a BA in Spanish. Samuel Burke then went to graduate studies at the university, graduating from a master's degree in journalism from the Walter Cronkite School of Journalism and Mass Communication. While pursuing his graduate studies there, Burke worked as the teaching assistant to former CNN anchor Aaron Brown. Since his 2009 graduation, Burke has returned several times to give seminars for current students attending the school. He is a member of the Cronkite School National Board of Advisors.

== Journalism ==
Burke was a co-anchor for the Spanish college news program Cronkite Newswatch in 2008 through 2009, which was broadcast on PBS and Telefutura, and was produced at the Walter Cronkite School. While attending graduate studies, Burke held an internship with CNN, working for the television program Anderson Cooper 360°. He also wrote for the Jewish News of Greater Phoenix. His first job out of college was as Christiane Amanpour's digital producer for the CNN show Amanpour. Initially there were no jobs available on the show, so he had decided to potentially take a job as a security guard at the CNN headquarters in New York City, work the nightshift, and volunteer for CNN programming during the day. Just before the start of the show, however, he was offered a temporary job with Amanpour, which turned into a full-time position.

Following his work with Christiane Amanpour, Burke was tapped to become the anchor for the CNN en Español program Europa Hoy from 2010 to 2011, a program based in London that was broadcast in both Latin America and North America. In 2011 he then became the anchor of the daily Cyber Café on CafeCNN. He also reports a nightly segment for the business news show CNN Dinero and a weekly segment on the technology news show CLIX. In addition Burke reports about technology on CNN International, appears on World Business Today, and reports on privacy and security on social media for the CNN U.S. news network. Burke is a CNN.com contributor; he once wrote a daily column on a range of international affairs, mainly in the Middle East.

In 2021, he became the host of the CNN series "Suddenly Family - DNA Discoveries with Samuel Burke" after discovering via an at-home DNA test that he isn't related to the Burke family. When his Jewish family learned they're also part of a Mormon Pioneer family, Burke began documenting his family and people around the world whose lives have been upended by at-home DNA testing.
