= George Flint (gridiron football) =

American gridiron football player (born 1937)

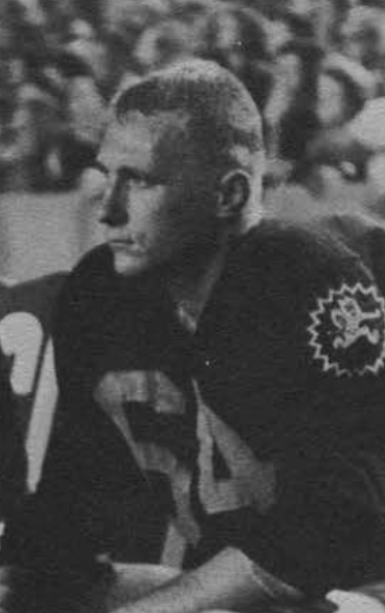
- Flint in 1961

No. 73, 55, 63
- Position: Offensive guard

Personal information
- Born: February 26, 1937 (age 89); Erie, Pennsylvania, U.S.
- Listed height: 6 ft 4 in (1.93 m)
- Listed weight: 240 lb (109 kg)

Career information
- High school: North (Phoenix, Arizona)
- College: Arizona State (1958–1961)
- NFL draft: 1962: undrafted

Career history
- Buffalo Bills (1962–1965); Oakland Raiders (1966); Houston Oilers (1967)*; BC Lions (1967); Buffalo Bills (1968)
- * Offseason or practice squad member only

Awards and highlights
- 2× AFL champion (1964, 1965); AFL All-Star (1965)

Career AFL statistics
- Games played: 65
- Games started: 11
- Stats at Pro Football Reference

George Howard Flint (born February 26, 1937) is an American former professional football player who was an offensive guard for five seasons with the Buffalo Bills of the American Football League (AFL). He played college football for the Arizona State Sun Devils. Flint was an AFL All-Star in 1965, and a member of the Bills teams that won the 1964 and 1965 AFL championships. He also played for the BC Lions of the Canadian Football League (CFL).

== Early life and college ==
George Howard Flint was born on February 26, 1937, in Erie, Pennsylvania. He attended North High School in Phoenix, Arizona.

He was a member of the Arizona State Sun Devils from 1958 to 1961 and a three-year letterman from 1959 to 1961. He was named first-team All-Border Conference in 1960 and 1961.

== Professional career ==
Flint signed with the Buffalo Bills of the American Football League (AFL) in 1962 after going undrafted. He played in all 14 games for the Bills during his rookie season in 1962. He appeared in nine games, starting six, in 1963. He played in all 14 games, starting one, during the 1964 season. He also appeared in the 1964 AFL Championship Game, a 20–7 victory over the San Diego Chargers. Flint played in all 14 games for the third season in 1965. He also started the 1965 AFL Championship Game, a 23–0 victory over the Chargers. He was named an AFL All-Star for the 1965 season.

On January 30, 1966, Flint and Tom Keating were traded to the Oakland Raiders for Bo Roberson. Flint was placed on injured reserve on September 1, 1966, and spent the entire season there. He was waived on August 6, 1967.

Flint was claimed off waivers by the Houston Oilers on August 7, 1967. He was released by the Oilers on September 5, 1967.

He then played in eight games for the BC Lions of the Canadian Football League (CFL) during the 1967 CFL season.

Flint signed with the Bills again on August 2, 1968. He played in 14 games, starting three, for the Bills in 1968. He retired on August 25, 1969.
