= Meg Griffiths =

American photographer

- Born: Megan Shea Griffiths; Bloomington, Indiana
- Education: University of Texas, Savannah College of Art and Design
- Known for: Photography

Meg Griffiths is a photographer based in Denton, Texas.

Griffiths studied photography at Savannah College of Art and Design, completing a master's in fine arts in 2012. The following year she was named on PDN's 30 New and Emerging Photographers to Watch 2013 list.

Griffiths is an Assistant Professor of Photography and Area Head in the Department of Visual Art at Texas Woman's University. Her work has been exhibited publicly across the United States. Her work has also been published in several magazines and newspapers including Oxford American, Aint Bad Magazine, Boston Globe, Photo District News, South X Southeast Magazine, Lenscratch, Le Journal de la Photographie, and Fraction Magazine. In 2017, she received the Julia Margaret Cameron Award for Best Fine Art Series.

== Photography ==
=== Casa de fruta y pan ===
The series Casa de fruta y pan (2011–2014) includes photographs of domestic life in Cuba. The series was published in a catalog by Anti-Bad in 2015.
