= Meg Russell =

British political scientist

Meg Russell FBA is a constitutional scholar of British politics. She is Professor of British and Comparative Politics at University College London.

== Biography ==
Russell worked in the House of Commons and for the British Labour Party before taking up a role with UCL at the Constitution Unit. In 2006 she was awarded the Richard Rose Prize from the Political Studies Association. She has served as an advisor to the Select Committee on Reform of the House of Commons and the Public Administration and Constitutional Affairs Select Committee. Russell is a senior fellow at the UK in a Changing Europe research institute and an Associate of the Institute for Government. She was elected as a Fellow of the British Academy in 2020.

== Select publications ==
- Russell, M., James, L. 2023. The Parliamentary Battle over Brexit. Oxford University Press.
- Russell, M. 2017. Legislation at Westminster: Parliamentary Actors and Influence in the Making of British Law. Oxford University Press.
- Heffernan, R., Hay, C., Russell, M., Cowley, P. (eds.) 2016 Developments In British Politics 10. Palgrave Macmillan.
- Russell, M. 2013. The Contemporary House of Lords: Westminster Bicameralism Revived. Oxford University Press.
- Russell, M. 2005. Building New Labour: The Politics of Party Organisation. Palgrave Macmillan.
