= Meg Sneed =

American activist

- Born: August 16, 1982 (age 43)
- Known for: Right to Marry: Arizona, H.E.R.O.

Meg Sneed (born 1982) is an LGBTQ activist from Phoenix who founded the Right to Marry: Arizona campaign and cofounded the H.E.R.O. (Human and Equal Rights Organizers) organization.

== LGBT work ==
During 2006, Meg Sneed participated as a member of the first Soulforce Equality Ride. She also, in 2006, attempted to enlist in the Coast Guard of the United States to protest the military's "Don't ask, don't tell" policy.

In 2008, Meg Sneed founded the Right to Marry: Arizona campaign. The campaign uses the framework of pilgrimage for its outreach. Each summer a group of core Equality Walkers walk a mile for every year Arizona has been a state without full legal recognition of its LGBTQ citizens. The Equality Walkers utilize these miles to speak to police, city slickers, faith communities, elected officials and individuals in diverse districts. In 2008 the Equality Walkers completed 96 miles through western Maricopa County, in order to raise awareness about Proposition 102, and in 2009 the Equality Walkers completed 97 miles through eastern Maricopa County focusing their outreach to diverse faith communities. In 2010 the Equality Walkers completed 98 miles through Northern Arizona walking through some of the most rural cities in the State and putting faces and stories to the issue of Marriage Equality. In 2011 the Equality Walkers completed 99 miles in the extreme heat and desert of Southern Arizona.

After the passage of Proposition 102, Meg Sneed vowed to continue the fight regardless and to steadily work to regain individual rights conferred by marriage, 300 by Arizona law and another 1,100 by federal law. She and others held a rally after its passage that contained over 5,000 supporters.

In November 2008, Meg Sneed and other young activists formed H.E.R.O. (Human & Equal Rights Organizers). H.E.R.O. is an organization that works with the community, in order to profess the ideals of S.A.V.E. (Service, Action, Visibility, and Education) events.

In February 2009, Meg Sneed and friend Melissa Halverson, began to work toward removing the ban on homosexuals donating blood, which states that men who have had sex with men are permanently banned from donating. They gained the support of United Blood Services in their actions.

In April 2010, Meg Sneed, Jimmy Gruender, Lee Walters, Luisa Valdez and Lonnie Allen Howard-Stidham refused to leave Senator McCain's office until McCain spoke with them about Howard-Stidham's 2007 discharge from the Coast Guard under Don't Ask, Don't Tell. The five were arrested when they refused to leave.

In July 2010 Meg Sneed joined the national group GetEqual in Las Vegas to protest Senate Majority Leader Harry Reid's inaction on bringing the Employment Non Discrimination Act to the Senate floor. Eight activists were arrested for shutting down the Las Vegas Strip for almost thirty minutes. Las Vegas Police stated that this is the first time in 15 years that a group has successfully shut down the Strip.

In September 2010 Meg Sneed and other members of H.E.R.O. interrupted a Senate Armed Services Committee hearing. Members of H.E.R.O. stood up in the middle of the hearing; where they invoked images of those who have stood in the way of civil rights progress in the past and demanded Senator McCain immediately end his threat to filibuster Don't Ask, Don't Tell. Activists held signs saying, "Senator McCain Repeal Don't Ask Don't Tell, Do You Want to Be the next George Wallace?" and "Senator McCain Repeal Don't Ask Don't Tell, It's Not Too Late to Change Your Legacy.

In August 2012 The Right to Marry: Arizona officially was re branded as the Equality Walk. Meg Sneed lead the fifth year of the Equality Walk, and for the first time had two campaigns which covered the entire State of Arizona visiting 35 cities on foot.

== Awards ==
2011 Echo Magazine Readers' Choice Award "HEROIC Service by a Woman"

2011 Phoenix Pride "grand marshal"

City of Phoenix Martin Luther King "Living the Dream Award"

Echo Magazine "2010 Woman of the Year"

Echo Magazine "Hall of Fame"

American University "Richard L. Schlegel Award for Visionary Leader"

'N Touch Magazine "2009 Woman of the Year

== Writer ==
Meg is a columnist for Echo Magazine.

== See also ==
- LGBT-welcoming church programs
- Same-sex marriage status in the United States by state
