= Capita =

Business process outsourcing and professional services company

Capita plc
- Formerly: Known Limit Limited (1986–1987); Capita Limited (March–April 1987); Capita Holdings Limited (1987–1988); The Capita Group PLC (1988–2012)
- Type: Public limited company
- Traded as: LSE: CPI
- Industry: Business process outsourcing; Professional services
- Founded: 1984
- Headquarters: London, England
- Key people: David Lowden (Chairman); Adolfo Hernandez (Chief Executive)
- Products: BPO & service transformation; Back office administration; Customer service; Finance & treasury; Claims & policy administration; HR, staff support & training; ICT & software; Corporate services; Advisory services; Property & infrastructure; Offshore outsourcing
- Revenue: ▼£2,312.3 million (2025)
- Operating income: ▼£(129.6) million (2025)
- Net income: ▼£(165.6) million (2025)
- Number of employees: 34,000 (2026)
- Website: capita.com

Capita plc is an international business process outsourcing and professional services company headquartered in London. It is the largest business process outsourcing and professional services company in the United Kingdom, with an overall market share of 29% in 2016, and has clients in central government, local government and the private sector. It also has a property and infrastructure consultancy division which is the fourth largest multidisciplinary consultancy in the UK. Roughly half of its turnover comes from the private sector and half from the public sector. Whilst UK-focused, Capita also has operations across Europe, Africa and Asia.

Established in 1984 and gaining its independence in 1987 management buyout, Capita's early business activities were largely orchestrated by Rod Aldridge, the company's first executive chairman. Since 1991, it has been listed on the London Stock Exchange. Various British government bodies have contracted services out to Capita, including the Ministry of Defence, Department for Business, Innovation and Skills, Department for Work and Pensions and numerous NHS Trusts. Aldridge stepped down as the company's CEO in 2006 amid claims that a personal loan made to the Labour Party had influenced government contracts that were awarded to Capita. In February 2007, a Capita office in Victoria, London was subject to a letter bomb attack that injured one person. In September 2019, Capita announced that it was re-branding as a "purpose-led" living wage employer; however, it subsequently abandoned this position after reports emerged that thousands of its employees were being paid below the minimum wage.

Across much of its existence, Capita has frequently engaged in acquisitions of other companies to fuel its growth, as well as the occasional divestment dependent upon circumstance; some of this acquisitions, such as of the 2015 purchase of a former government research operation responsible for food safety, has been subject to criticism. During 2018, following a profit warning, dividend suspension, a £700 million rights issue, and other measures amid rising debts and a pensions deficit, the company's share value dropped by 47%. Several divestments of non-core divisions took place during the late 2010s and early 2020s. In May 2019, the company became the first FTSE 250 company in 30 years to appoint rank-and-file workers to its board. During early 2023, Capita acknowledged that hackers had breached its systems and stolen personal information of almost a hundred business clients. In 2025-26, thousands of civil servants have had their imminent pensions delayed by months, with no communication from Capita. Some have had to defer their retirement or are in financial hardship.

== History ==
Capita was formed in 1984, as a division of the non-profit Chartered Institute of Public Finance and Accountancy (CIPFA). During 1987, it became an independent company with 33 staff as a result of a management buyout, led by Rod Aldridge, the company's first executive chairman. During 1991, it was listed on the London Stock Exchange.

A key development in Capita's fortunes was the emergence of the private finance initiative (PFI) model, under which private companies such as Capita could secure government contracts that involved them paying for the construction and delivery costs of a given project, such as a school or hospital, and earning income by renting the finished project to the public sector. Via PFI, Capita was awarded contracts for the provision of various services across numerous British government departments, including the National Health Service and the Ministry of Defence.

In October 1999, Capita purchased Capstan, a UK-based supplier of emergency cover teachers, in exchange for £6 million in cash and £7 million in shares in the business. During May 2001, it acquired the UK business of the loss adjuster McLarens Toplis in exchange of £33 million. Two years later, the company announced that it had achieved a record operating profit of £107 million.

During March 2006, Aldridge resigned as Capita's CEO in the aftermath of claims that contracts awarded to the company had been influenced by his loan of £1 million to the Labour Party. At the time of his resignation, Aldridge denied the claims and stated that he was leaving the company to avoid any lingering doubts on the matter. Aldridge had overseen the company's growth from a small company in 1987 to a FTSE 100 member in 2006. He was replaced by his longtime associate Paul Pindar.

In February 2007, a Capita office in Victoria, London was subject to a letter bomb attack that injured one person.

On 2 October 2009, one of Capita's businesses (Capita Financial Group) announced plans to move some of its operations from London to Leeds.

During the early 2010s, Capita undertook a series of acquisitions. In April 2011, it bought Right Document Solutions Holdings Limited ('RDS') for a cash-free consideration of £30 million; later that same year, it acquired the customer contact specialist Ventura in exchange for a cash consideration of £65 million. On 28 February 2013, Capita bought the Fire Service College from the Department for Communities and Local Government for £10 million.

In 2014, Pindar stepped down as Capita's CEO, he was replaced by Andy Parker.

During 2015, the company acquired Avocis, a German call centre business, and Trustmarque Solutions from rival outsourcing group Liberata in exchange for £57 million. In 2016, it purchased Orange Bus, a specialist digital interaction agency, and NYS Corporate events and travel agency in 2017. Around this time, Capita secured several key appointments and contracts within the British public sector.

In October 2017, the company announced that former Amec Foster Wheeler CEO Jonathan Lewis would take over as CEO from 1 December 2017, following the departure of Andy Parker. After completing an initial assessment, on 31 January 2018, Lewis announced a profit warning, dividend suspension, a £700 million rights issue, cost cutting and a disposals programme, as net debts were predicted to hit £1.15 billion and a pensions deficit reached £381 million. The announcement knocked 47% off Capita's shares, reducing its market value by over £1.1 billion. The share price slide continued the following day, losing a further 13%. On 3 April 2018, Capita shares fell 6% to a 20-year low after British Airways decided to retain in-house operation of two UK call centres rather than award contracts to run them to Capita. On 23 April 2018, Capita launched a cash call to raise £701m and reported a £513m loss for the previous financial year. On 1 August 2018, Capita announced its profits in the six months to 30 June had dropped to £80.5m (from £195m in the same period in 2017), while revenues were down 4% to £1.98bn; the company's shares fell almost 9% after markets opened, to 148p a share.

Following Lewis's appointment, Capita embarked on a medium-term strategy to turn around the company. In May 2019, the company became the first FTSE 250 company in 30 years to appoint rank-and-file workers to its board. Lyndsay Browne, a chartered accountant and finance manager, and Joseph Murphy, a project manager in the real estate division, topped competition from other internal candidates to become the first workers' representatives on Capita's board.

In September 2019, Capita announced that it was re-branding as a "purpose-led" living wage employer, changing its logo for the first time in 13 years. The company said that from April 2020, it will pay all 40,000 of its employees an independently verified "real living wage". This will involve a pay rise for almost 6,000 employees. The rates, which are set at the basic income needed to cover the real cost of living, are overseen by the Living Wage Commission. Less than five years later, Capita announced it would stop paying the real living wage and freeze pay for all staff as part of cost-cutting measures.

During the early 2020s, the company undertook a series of divestments of non-core businesses with the aim of raising £700 million in response to financial pressures from the COVID-19 pandemic. Nevertheless, Capita still opted to make several strategic purchases and investments.

In July 2023 Capita announced that Lewis would be stepping down at the end of that year and that Adolfo Hernandez would be the new CEO for the group. Hernandez joined from AWS where he was vice president for their global telecommunications business.

== Operations ==
=== Consultancy division ===
In July 2019, the company announced that it was launching a consultancy arm. The new division will employ around 1,000 consultants and compete with the likes of Accenture, Deloitte and KPMG.

=== Healthcare recruitment ===
Capita entered the healthcare recruitment market during May 2011, through acquisition of Team24, a healthcare recruitment specialist owned by Robert Stiff extending the services offered within the recruitment industry.

=== Capita Financial Administrators ===
In March 2006, Capita Financial Administrators (CFA) was fined £300,000 by the Financial Services Authority for having poor anti-fraud controls. The division provides administration services for third parties and the Capita Group.

=== Legal services ===
Capita also intended to enter into the legal services market and entered into a funding arrangement with the Law Firm Optima Legal Services Limited which saw them, in the period between May 2006, to the end of 2009, invest a total of £36,700,000 by way of investment loans into Optima. As part of the funding arrangement Capita Group had the option of acquiring the shares of Optima Legal Services for the nominal sum of £1 upon the full implementation of the Legal Services Act 2007, which would make ownership of law firms by the likes of Capita possible. It is thought that such Alternative Business Structures ("ABS") could be lawful around October 2011. However, on 9 August 2010, it was reported that the Solicitors Regulatory Authority ("SRA") had found that the arrangement breached its rules in that it effectively amounted to an ABS. As a consequence, Optima Legal Services Lead Litigation and Property Partners, Philip Robinson and Anthony Ruane respectively were both severely reprimanded by the SRA for what was found to be professional misconduct and only narrowly avoided referral to the Solicitors Disciplinary Tribunal and Adrian Lamb, former CEO of Optima Legal Services Limited, left the business in June 2010.

=== Constructionline ===
In 1998, Capita won the contract to run Constructionline, the newly created Public-Private Partnership owned by the Department for Business, Innovation and Skills (BIS). During March 2012, Capita acquired the UK arm of the construction consultancy firm Northcroft. In January 2015, Capita acquired Constructionline outright from BIS for £35m. Three years later, on 31 January 2018, Capita announced it wanted to sell Constructionline as part of a transformation programme including disposal of non-core assets and cost cutting. In June 2018, it was reported that Constructionline had been sold to private equity investor Warburg Pincus for £160m.

=== NHS services ===
In June 2014, it was reported that at least five of eight Liverpool NHS Trusts which had contracted their payroll and recruitment to Capita in 2012, were withdrawing because of concerns about the quality of the service provided. Several NHS trusts contracted with the company for human resources services. West London Mental Health NHS Trust cancelled their contract in September 2014, after the company proved "unable to meet acceptable 'time to hire' targets", particularly for nurses. At the same time Alder Hey Children's NHS Foundation Trust and Liverpool Heart and Chest Hospital NHS Foundation Trust terminated their contracts.

In November, Mersey Care Trust revealed that "information governance issues" had been uncovered when the services were taken back in-house. Details of staff at other Merseyside trusts were sent to Liverpool Community Health Trust's HR department.

The company was awarded a four-year contract to become sole provider of administrative services including payment administration, management of medical records and eligibility lists of practitioners for GPs, opticians and dentists across the UK by NHS England in June 2015. In July 2016, it was reported that there was "a large backlog of unprocessed correspondence relating to patients". It was earlier reported that the company was unable to deal "effectively" with the movement of paper records between practices.

During 2015, an undercover investigation by The Daily Telegraph showed that in some cases locum agencies, Medicare and Team24 owned by Capita were charging some hospitals higher fees than others and giving false company details. The agencies were charging up to 49% of the fee. Health secretary Jeremy Hunt criticised agencies who sought "big profits" at the expense of the NHS and taxpayers and promised to "reduce the margins rip-off agencies are able to generate."

The company established Primary Care Support England in September 2015, replacing former regional services provided by each local health authority. The new service was described as shambolic by the Local Optical Committee Support Unit and the Optical Confederation. A deal was negotiated to enable optician practices to claim interest, administrative costs and bank charges on late payments of General Ophthalmic Services fees by Capita. In August 2016, a survey of GPs found 85% were missing records of recently registered patients, 65% had experienced shortages of clinical supplies or delays in deliveries, and 32% had suffered from missed or delayed payments. Delays in the payment of GP trainees' salaries were also reported. The situation was repeated in October 2017, with The Guardian reporting that "hundreds" of trainee GPs had not been paid. Capita was unable to say how many were affected in what the Cameron fund – a GP hardship charity – blamed on "another botched privatisation." Inadequacies by Capita may have put patients at risk. The National Audit Office maintains almost 90 women were told incorrectly they were no longer in the cervical screening programme. Patients could have been at risk due to trouble with the 'performers list' a list of NHS dentists, GP's and opticians. "The failure to update performers lists may have compromised patient safety in cases where practitioners should have been removed," the report authors maintained. Roughly 1,000 dentists, doctors and opticians could not work in 2016 due to delays processing new applications. Further failures included a backlog of 500,000 patient registration letters, failure to deliver medical supplies, and patients' medical records being lost or delayed.

In March 2019, Simon Stevens announced that the cervical screening programme administration they had been running would be brought back in house.

=== Education services ===
- SIMS.net – Schools Information Management Software. A management information system used in 70% of primary and secondary schools across England and Wales to record many aspects of pupil data. In March 2009, Capita SIMS was said to be responsible for sending a truancy warning notice to the family of a Cheshire school pupil who had died two months before. SIMS also links with Capita One (through a process called B2B), which is a database used within Local Education Authorities for general analysis and overview of pupil and school data.
- Individual Learning Account – A £290 million scheme intended to give financial support to adult learners that was opened in 2000, and scrapped in 2001, following widespread and massive fraud.
- Connexions Card – A £109 million scheme that involved issuing 16- to 19-year-olds with smart cards that recorded their lesson attendance and rewarded them with discounts on consumer goods. It ran from 2002, until it was terminated in 2006, owing to lack of uptake.
- Education Maintenance Allowance for the Learning and Skills Council.
- Capita Education Resourcing – Capita Education Resourcing is an education recruitment specialist with a large networks of schools, colleges and nurseries across England and Wales. They have 19 offices covering teaching jobs operating throughout the UK.
- C2k (formerly Classroom 2000) - A Northern Ireland-wide ICT network operated on behalf of the Education Authority, providing internet connectivity, managed services, and digital learning tools to schools. The service has been funded by the Department of Education and European programmes, and is delivered under contract by Capita IT and Networks.

=== Irish postcodes ===
During 2014, Capita were awarded the contract to introduce postcodes to Ireland. The Irish communications minister has welcomed the implementation saying that the Irish code is the first in the world to be unique to each individual address. The scheme was launched in July 2015.

The emergency services have expressed concern that the new system may lead to responders having difficulty getting to incidents. Further, the Irish Data Protection Authority has raised concerns over the design of the code as information about individuals will be made more accessible. Liam Duggan, CEO of Capita Ireland stated at a Government enquiry in 2014, that they had thoroughly tested the new system for unsuitable words and even used a game of Scrabble for this purpose.

The project is generally running to programme and budget: roll out, which was originally planned to start in March 2015, will now take place in "mid-2015" and the cost, which was originally budgeted at €25 million has increased to €27 million.

=== Ministry of Defence Services ===
In 2012, Capita was awarded a 10 year long recruiting contract for the British Army, worth £1.3 billion. However, they have been greatly criticised, as they failed to meet the army's recruiting target every year up until 2020, with the shortfall ranging between 21% and 45% every single year. According to the National Audit Office one of the main failings of the contract was the new recruiting website, that was delivered in 2017- four years late and three times the original cost. In 2020, the contract was extended for two further years, meaning that it will now terminate in 2024. The Public Accounts Committee stated that Capita entered into the contract without "understanding the complexity of what it was taking on."

During 2019, Capita won a 12-year contract to operate the Defence Fire and Rescue Service, at 53 sites across the UK, Cyprus, and the Falkland Islands, in a deal worth £525 million. The deal also saw Capita take over all the work of the Defence Fire Training and Development Centre and transfer it to the national Fire Service College- including Royal Air Force firefighter training. However, Capita once more was subject to criticism when it proposed to cut firefighter numbers at HMNB Clyde and RNAD Coulport, two nuclear warhead facilities, by 15% less than two years after the contract was awarded. This was described as a purely cost-cutting measure, as the firm is set to request the Scottish Fire and Rescue Service to backfill the gaps in response.

In December 2020, an industry consortium led by Capita, called Fisher Training won a contract to deliver shore-based training to the Royal Navy and Royal Marines at 16 sites across the UK. The consortium is composed of Capita, Raytheon UK, Elbit Systems UK, and Fujitsu, and the contract is worth up to £2 billion.

=== Capita Scaling Partner ===
In 2018 Capita Scaling Partner was established as a corporate venture capita investment arm focused on B2B tech companies in customer services, AI and augmented reality. As a result of the financial losses reported in 2023 the Capita Scaling Partner business was discontinued.

== Criticism ==
Capita Group has not been received well in the media. It has gained the nickname "Crapita", particularly from the coverage in the satirical and current affairs magazine Private Eye, which routinely documents the company's many failures and setbacks in the public sector.

During January 2013, it was revealed that Capita was embroiled in a scandal over misinforming people that they had to leave the UK as they had no valid visa. One such person was, in fact, the holder of a UK passport.

In April 2014, a leak to The Guardian revealed that the Department for Work and Pensions (DWP) had to send civil servants in to help the company process personal independence payments for the seriously ill and the disabled. "Waiting times for assessment," the newspaper noted, "have been so long that in some cases people with terminal conditions have died before receiving a penny."

The 2015 sale of a government research operation charged with overlooking food safety to Capita has been criticised by Tim Lang, an advisor to the UK government and the WHO on food safety issues. Arguing that a for-profit operation will be under pressure to ignore low-paying projects vital to public safety and the environment, he indicates that there is no profit in public research concerning food and biodiversity or food and pesticide residues, and predicts "commercial concerns will skew Fera's priorities".

In December 2016, Liberal Democrat leader Tim Farron questioned how Atos and Capita could have been paid over £500m from taxpayers money for assessing fitness to work as 61% who appealed won their appeals. Farron stated, "This adds to the suspicion that these companies are just driven by a profit motive, and the incentive is to get the assessments done, but not necessarily to get the assessments right. They are the ugly face of business."

In September 2021, it was revealed that Capita had been paying thousands of its employees below the minimum wage. In early 2025, Capita staff were striking due to unpaid pay awards that were due in April 2024.

== 2023 Cyberattack ==
In late March 2023 hackers gained access to Capita's systems, stole large volumes of client and staff information and then deployed ransomware, disrupting internal IT services and causing prolonged outages across parts of the business.

Major clients, including the Universities Superannuation Scheme, later confirmed that personal data about hundreds of thousands of pension scheme members may have been compromised. By the end of May 2023, at least 90 organisations had notified the Information Commissioner's Office (ICO) of personal data breaches linked to the incident, and Capita estimated that the attack would cost up to £25 million in recovery and remediation expenses.

An investigation by the ICO concluded that personal data relating to around 6.6 million individuals, including special category data such as health and criminal record information, had been exfiltrated, prompting hundreds of complaints and a High Court multi-party claim on behalf of more than 5,000 people. In October 2025 the ICO fined Capita plc and Capita Pension Solutions Limited a combined £14 million for failures to implement appropriate security measures under the UK GDPR.

== 2025 Civil Service Pension Scheme Mismanagement ==
In December 2025, Capita officially took over the Civil Service Pension Scheme from incumbent operator MyCSP. It was widely reported that Capita underestimated the size of the backlog of complex cases inherited from MyCSP. This started at 86,000 and grew to over 120,000 in less than a week. Service levels dropped significantly resulting in delayed pension quotations and missed payments for retiring and already retired civil servants. As a result the Cabinet Office deployed a civil service surge resource of over 140 officials to support service normalisation and made 'hardship loans' of up to £20,000 available to affected civil servants.

Despite this, in March 2026, Capita was awarded a £370m contract to run Business Process Services (BPS) for the Synergy Cluster comprising the Department for Work and Pensions (DWP), the Department for Environment, Food and Rural Affairs (Defra), the Ministry of Justice (United Kingdom) (MoJ) and, the Home Office (HO). DWP has since confirmed the tender process for this contract was conducted in line with Government Procurement standards.

In July 2026, the Cabinet Office deployed independent auditors to review Capita's systems, data integrity and compliance as part of an 'enforcement plan' stating that the government would seek to be repaid for every additional penny spent on resolving the pension crisis. As of July 2026, the Cabinet Office had witheld over £9.9m in payments to Capita as a result of the service failings.

As of September 2026, Capita had been unable to resolve the most complex cases with just over 2,500 cases still outstanding for more than 100 days. The government deployed the GAD to further support service normalisation.
