= Primary Care Support England =

British administrative organisation

Primary Care Support England is a support service for GP Practices, Pharmacies, Dentists and Opticians in England.

It provides administrative and payment services, sends out test results, manages supplies and runs the performers lists. It administers the authorisation process for access to the list of patients registered with GPs in England, processes patient registrations and moves patient records, and issues access credentials.

It is run by Capita under a £330 million seven year contract started in 2015. Capita relies on other organisations to provide some services.

In May 2018, the National Audit Office reported that failings by Capita and other organisations had hit primary care services and, potentially, put patients at risk. They recommended that NHS England should consider taking some or all of the work back in-house. The House of Commons Public Accounts Committee criticised NHS England for its handling of the contract, calling the arrangement short sighted and a shambles, and saying that in its rush to save money. It failed to consider the impact on the 39,000 GPs, dentists, opticians, and pharmacists affected.

Katrina Venerus, clinical director of the Local Optical Committee Support Unit, was seconded to the organisation in August 2018 to help with the modernisation of the ophthalmic payments service.

Capita's contract was extended by 3 years in 2022. It will run to 31 August 2025 at a cost of £94 million. The extension was not welcomed by the British Medical Association.
