= Connexions Card =

Defunct rewards card programme

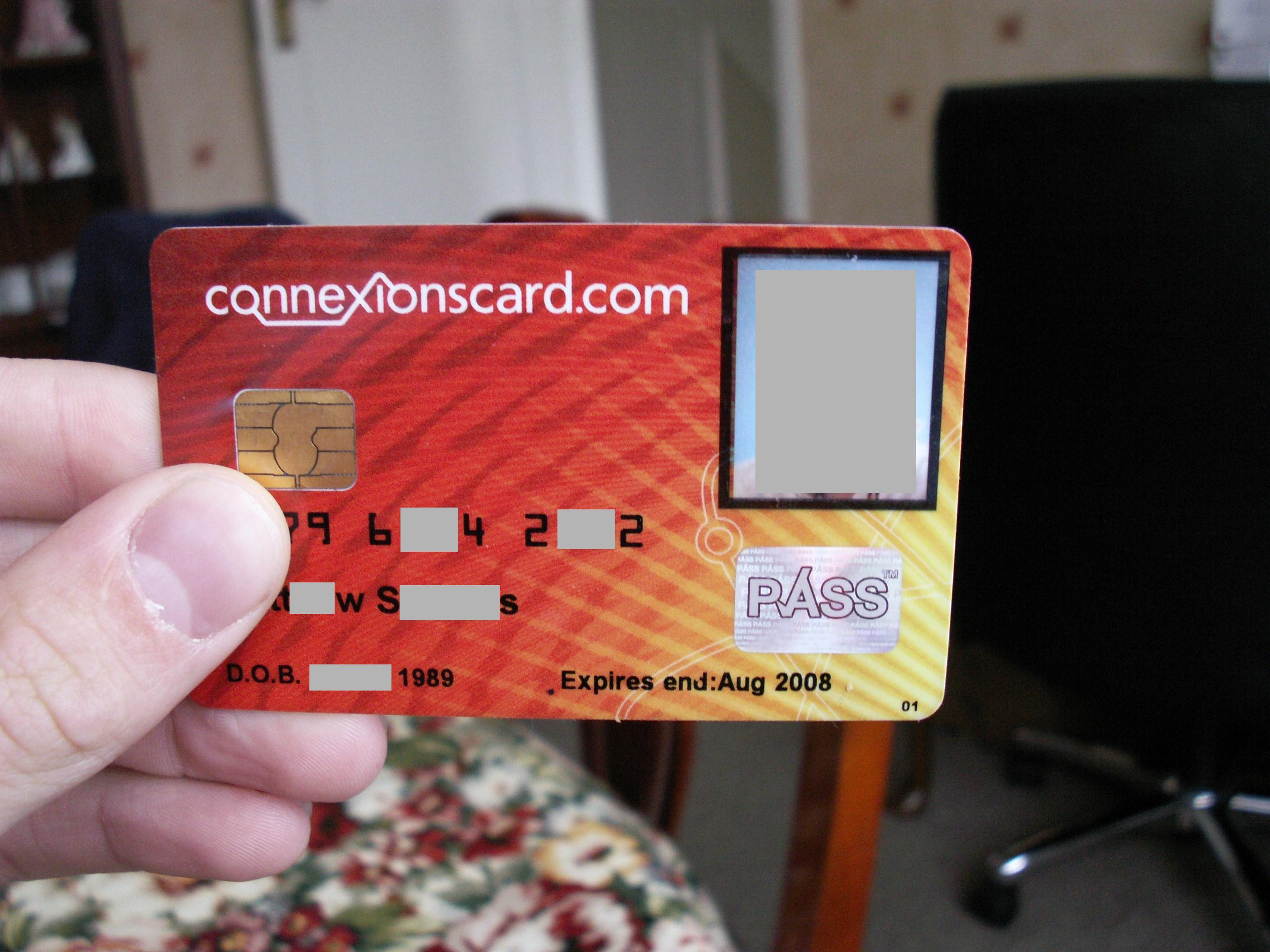
A typical Connexions Card

The Connexions Card was a smart card for 16- to 19-year-olds in England for rewarding students who turned up to lessons, work-based training and other activities with points that could be redeemed for discounts on consumer goods listed on the Connexions website, bus journeys or suitable goods in local retailers.

The seven-year contract to run the Connexions Card was won by Capita, signed in July 2001, and operated as a Public-Private Partnership with a budget of £109million.

The scheme flopped and was sunsetted in the summer of 2006 with a saving of £23million. Over the course of its operation, from its roll-out in early 2002 to its conclusion, one million cards had been issued but only 145,947 had ever been used. (183 million out of 1.6 billion points had been redeemed.)

An official evaluation of the programme completed in September 2004 concluded that the programme had fallen far short of its aims (e.g. 1.7 million young people using the card in a steady state) and there was no clear evidence of a direct impact on attitudes to attendance, learning or career choices. Indeed, the only young people to use the cards were those who didn't have a problem in the first place. The inflexible contract with Capita was also singled out as a barrier to targeting the product more effectively. And, as predicted, the system where students had to swipe their cards through a reader connected to Capita's central database at the beginning of every lesson (in addition to the school keeping its own attendance register) was a disaster.

== See also ==
- Individual Learning Account
