= Prescription charges =

Charges for medical prescriptions on the UK NHS, and in Ireland

In the United Kingdom most medicines are supplied via the National Health Service at either no charge, or for a fixed charge for up to three months' worth of any medicine. Charges for prescriptions for medicines and some medical appliances are payable by adults in England under the age of 60, but not by older people or children. However, people may be exempt from charges in various exemption categories. Charges were abolished by NHS Wales in 2007, Health and Social Care in Northern Ireland in 2010 and by NHS Scotland in 2011. In 2010/11, in England, £450 million was raised through these charges, some 0.5% of the total NHS budget. As of 2025 the prescription charge is £9.90 per item.

Ireland also has a system of fixed charges rather than individually priced medicines, but the details are totally different.

== History ==
When the National Health Service was established in 1948 all prescriptions were free. The power to make a charge was introduced in the NHS Amendment Act 1949 under pressure from Chancellor of the Exchequer Stafford Cripps, but Minister of Health Aneurin Bevan managed to block their implementation by threatening to resign. In 1951 Cripps's successor Hugh Gaitskell and Foreign Secretary Herbert Morrison did introduce NHS charges for dentures and spectacles in order to help fund the Korean War, leading Bevan to resign in protest. Charges on medications were introduced in 1952, by the Conservative government of Winston Churchill, at a rate of one shilling (£0.05, 5 pence, in decimal currency) per prescription.

There were exemptions for people in receipt of National Assistance or War Disablement Pension, children under 16 or at school, and venereal disease patients. In 1956 the rules were changed so that a charge applied to each item prescribed. In 1961 it was doubled to 2s (£0.10, in decimal currency). Charges were abolished by the Wilson Government in February 1965, but reintroduced in June 1968 at 2s 6d (£0.125, in decimal currency), but with a wider range of exemptions. Charges were increased over the years; as of 2025 the prescription charge in England (but not other UK countries) is £9.90.

Prescription charges and exemptions are administered by the NHS Business Services Authority.

The existing list of medical exemptions is essentially a list of conditions for which long-term life-saving medication was available in 1968, and it has never been revised since. The policy on prescription charges was dismissed as a "dog's dinner" by the Social Market Foundation, which said in 2003 that the rules determining who must pay for medicines were unfair and illogical.

In 2007, a survey conducted by Ipsos Mori found that 800,000 people failed to collect a prescription during 2007 due to cost.

In 2008, 88% of patients in England received medicines free of charge. Prime Minister Gordon Brown introduced an exemption for cancer patients—previously not exempt—in 2009, and promised free prescriptions for people with long-term conditions.

The Prescription Charges Coalition, a campaigning organisation of which the Royal Pharmaceutical Society and numerous organisations of disabled people are members, launched a survey investigating the impact of prescription charges on people in England with long-term conditions in March 2017. It advocates free prescriptions for everyone with long-term conditions. In July 2017 they said a third of patients of working age had not collected a prescription because of cost.

The Royal College of General Practitioners launched a campaign in May 2017 to scrap mental health prescription charges for students.

Normal practice in Wales was to prescribe 28 days'-worth, but in 2022 Community Pharmacy Wales asked GPs in Wales to extend repeat prescription intervals from 28 to 56 days to free up community pharmacists' time.

== Exemptions ==
Prescriptions in England are free for:

- children under 16,
- people between 16 and 18 who are in full-time education,
- people who get some means-tested benefits such as Income Support, income-based Jobseeker's Allowance, income-related Employment and Support Allowance or the guaranteed credit part of Pension Credit and Universal Credit if their net earnings are £435 or less in the last month, or £935 or less if they get money for a child or who have a limited capability to work,
- people over 60,
- women who are pregnant or have had a baby in the previous 12 months and have a valid maternity exemption certificate (MatEx)
- people who have a certificate (HC2) entitling them to help under the NHS Low Income Scheme. An HC3 certificate gives some help but not exemption from charges.
- people with certain medical conditions (e.g. diabetes)

Exemptions were applied for by ticking a box on a paper prescription form. In July 2022 the Department for Work and Pensions 'Real Time Exemption Checking' system was implemented, and most eligible patients no longer needed to apply for exemption as more than 80% of community pharmacies in England can digitally check eligibility electronically with the NHS database.

=== Medical exemptions ===
Patients with any of these conditions who have a valid medical exemption certificate (MedEx) are entitled to free prescriptions for all conditions, not limited to the qualifying condition. Exemptions, including those for medical conditions, are specified in the NHS Electronic Drug Tariff

- epilepsy needing continuous therapy
- a permanent fistula
- diabetes mellitus
- hyperthyroidism (also referred to as Graves' Disease, an autoimmune disorder)
- myxoedema which occurs in hypothyroidism, or hyperthyroidism
- hypoparathyroidism
- diabetes insipidus or hypopituitarism
- Addison's disease and other forms of hypoadrenalism
- myasthenia gravis
- any continuing physical disability which stops them going out alone
- undergoing treatment for cancer, including the effects of cancer, or the effects of current or previous cancer treatment

Medical Exemption Certificates last for five years, and are not applicable to NHS wigs or fabric supports.

Medicines administered at an NHS hospital or an NHS walk-in centre, personally administered by a GP, contraceptives or supplied at a hospital or clinic for the treatment of a sexually transmitted infection or tuberculosis are always free. War pensioners do not pay if the prescription is for their war disability.

There is concern that exemptions are arbitrary and many chronic illnesses are not included in the list. Some people on low income cannot easily afford their prescriptions and do not collect prescribed medicines when short of money, often leading to avoidable hospitalisation, which may cost the NHS more than providing free prescriptions.

=== Administration ===
An online tool to help patients understand the eligibility criteria for free prescriptions was launched in September 2018, and prescription exemptions were digitised to allow eligibility for exemption to be checked before they are dispensed. Pharmacies or other dispensers are reimbursed for the cost of the medicines through NHS Prescription Services, a division of the NHS Business Services Authority.

== Penalties ==
A person who claims exemption without having a valid exemption certificate is liable for a penalty charge, which is five times what they should have paid, up to a maximum of £100, plus the original charge itself. If they do not prove entitlement to help with health costs, and do not pay the amount stated in the penalty charge notice, the NHS may take court action to recover the debt. The penalty charge is increased by 50 percent of the penalty charge if they do not pay within 28 days of the date the penalty charge notice is sent. 979,210 people were fined in 2016–17, double the number, 494,129, in 2015–16. Most had failed to renew their certificate, as there was no effective reminder system. The Public Accounts Committee found in 2019 that 1.7 million incorrect penalties had been overturned since 2014, almost a third of the fines issued, worth £188 million. The committee commented on the "breathtaking complacency" of the fining system. 21,497 penalty notices were withdrawn in 2018/2019 because the patient had actually paid.

== Discounts ==
For those who do not qualify for free prescriptions, Prescription Prepayment Certificates (PPC) are available, covering all prescription charges for a period of three or twelve months, at a cost approximately equivalent to one prescription per month.

Some over-the-counter medicines cost less than the prescription charge.

== Refunds ==
Refunds are available for charges made to people who qualify for free prescriptions: "Where any person who is entitled to a repayment of any charge paid under the Charges Regulations presents an NHS pharmacist with a valid claim for the repayment within three months of the date on which the charge was paid, the NHS pharmacist must make the repayment." (Regulation 96 of the NHS (Pharmaceutical and Local Pharmaceutical Services) Regulations 2013). This may apply, for example, to people actually exempt who pay for a prescription to avoid a possible fine.

Refunds can be obtained through any NHS England pharmacy on presentation of a valid FP57 form along with proof of exemption.

== Blacklist ==
If the prescriber has the appropriate prescribing rights, any food, drug, toiletry or cosmetic may be prescribed on an NHS prescription unless it is listed in the blacklist – Schedule 1 to the NHS (General Medical Services Contracts) (Prescription of Drugs etc.) Regulations 2004, reproduced in Part XVIIIA of the Drug Tariff.

== Ireland ==
The Drugs Payment Scheme ensures that a family ordinarily resident in Ireland has to pay no more than €100 per calendar month for a month's supply of prescribed medicines and medical appliances. Family means a person or a couple and their children aged under 18 (or under 23 if in full-time education) and any family member who has a physical or intellectual disability or an illness and is unable to fully maintain themself.

Those who are entitled to a medical card pay a government levy for each item dispensed. The levy is €2.00 up to a maximum of €20 per family per calendar month. The levy was reduced to €1.50 from April 2019 for medical card holders over the age of 70.

The Over 70s prescription charge was reduced to €1, and the Drugs Payment Scheme cap reduced to €114, in 2020.

The Long Term Illness Scheme provides free drugs, medicines and medical and surgical appliances for the treatment of specified conditions:

- Intellectual disability
- Mental illness (for people under 16 only)
- Diabetes insipidus
- Diabetes mellitus
- Haemophilia
- Cerebral palsy
- Phenylketonuria
- Epilepsy
- Cystic fibrosis
- Multiple sclerosis
- Spina bifida
- Muscular dystrophies
- Hydrocephalus
- Parkinsonism
- Acute leukaemia
- Conditions arising from use of Thalidomide

== See also ==
- Prescription drug
- Prescription costs – for the situation in other countries
