= General Optical Council =

The General Optical Council (GOC) is an organisation in the United Kingdom which maintains a register of opticians and regulates the services provided by dispensing opticians and optometrists. The stated function of the GOC is "to protect the public and promote high standards of professional conduct and education amongst opticians".

== Role ==
To practice as optometrist or work as a dispensing optician within the UK, individuals must demonstrate to the GOC that they are suitably qualified and fit to practise. The GOC also maintains a register of companies who carry on business as opticians. As of 2019, the register had around 30,000 optometrists, dispensing opticians, undergraduate optometry students, opticians and optical businesses.

The GOC sets standards so that every registered practitioner knows what is expected of them. They take action against opticians who do not meet these standards of professional conduct and also against people or companies who break the terms of the Opticians Act. A consultation on new standards of practice in 2015 received 2,000 responses. The Optical Confederation and other trade associations called for the new standards to be proportionate to the risks.

== History ==
The GOC was set up by the Opticians Act 1958 to maintain a register of opticians and to uphold the Act. Legislation was subsequently consolidated with the Opticians Act 1989.

The GOC was in the news at the end of September 2005 after taking action against eBay UK for "aiding and abetting" sales of contact lenses without the involvement of a qualified optician.

== Oversight of health and social care regulators ==
The Professional Standards Authority for Health and Social Care (PSA), is an independent body accountable to the UK Parliament, which promotes the health and wellbeing of the public and oversees the twelve UK healthcare regulators, including the General Optical Council.
