= C2K =

The acronym C2K may refer to:

- Classroom 2000 - a Northern Ireland-wide information and communications network
- Coast To Kosciuszko - ultramarathon run from sea level in mainland Australia
