= Political positions of David Cameron =

Political positions of the former British Prime Minister

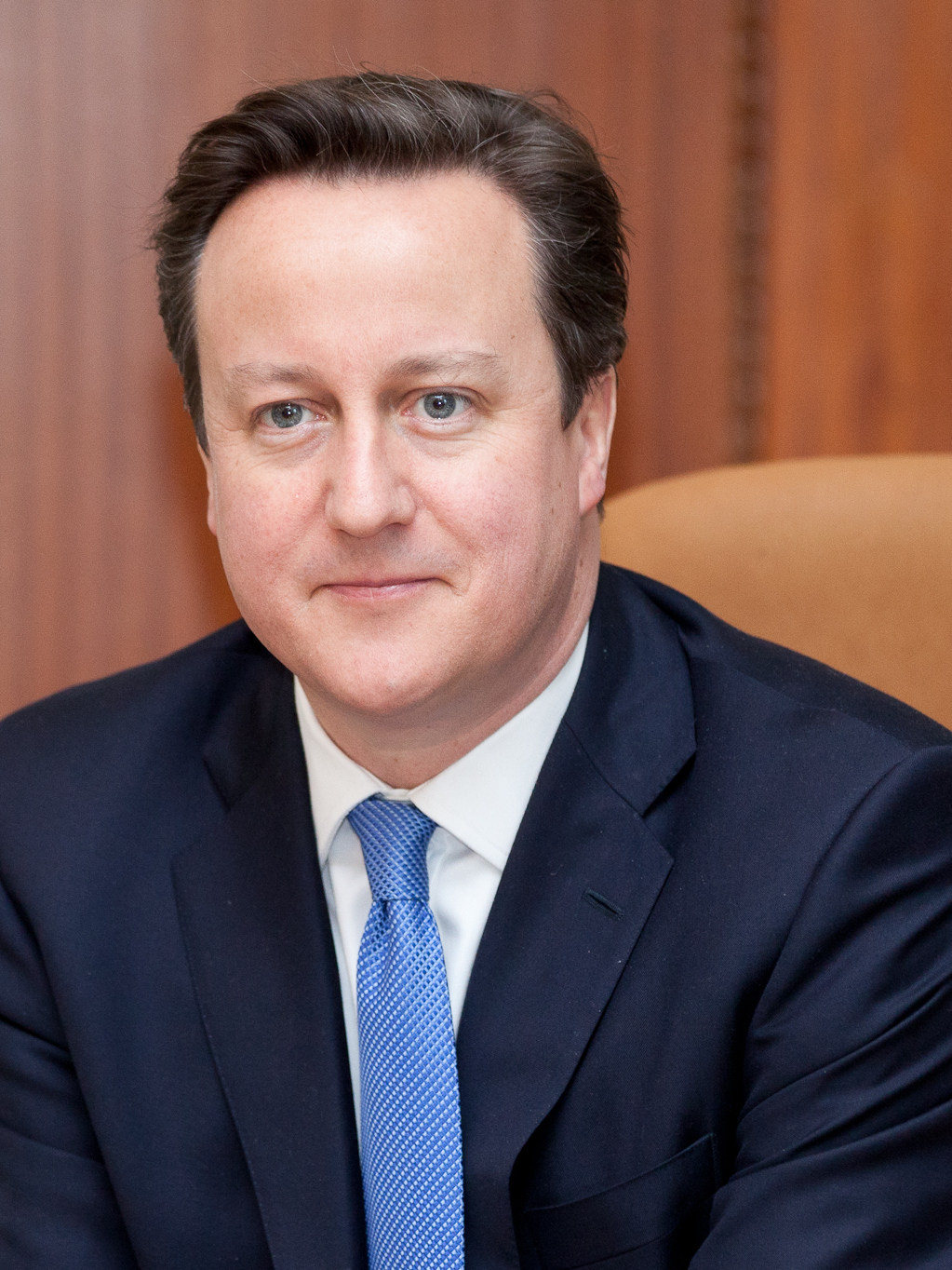
David Cameron in 2013

This article concerns the policies, views and voting record of David Cameron, former Prime Minister of the United Kingdom (May 2010 to July 2016) and former Foreign Secretary in the Sunak ministry (November 2023 to July 2024). Cameron describes himself as a "modern compassionate conservative" and has said that he is "fed up with the Punch and Judy politics of Westminster". He has stated that he is "certainly a big Thatcher fan, but I don't know whether that makes me a Thatcherite." Our Society, Your Life, a 2007 policy statement for the Conservative Party launched shortly after David Cameron became leader of the party, has been seen by some (such as Richard Kelly, head of politics at Manchester Grammar School) as a triangulation of Conservative ideology with that of Tony Blair's New Labour, linking into the idea of the Third Way and an attempted revival of one-nation conservatism. There have been claims that he described himself to journalists at a dinner during the leadership contest as the "Heir to Blair", and Cameron stated in 2005 that he did not intend to oppose the Labour government as a matter of course, and will offer his support in areas of agreement. He also wants to move the Conservatives focus away from purely fiscal matters, saying "It's time we admitted that there's more to life than money, and it's time we focused not just on GDP, but on GWB – general well-being". However, commentators have questioned the degree to which Cameron and his coalition have embodied this, instead locating them in the intellectual tradition of Thatcherism. However, Cameron has claimed to be a "liberal Conservative", and "not a deeply ideological person".

He and others in the "Notting Hill set" have sought to focus on issues such as the environment, work–life balance and international development – issues not previously seen as priorities for the post-Thatcher Conservative party. In a speech to the Conservative annual conference in October 2006, he identified the concept of "social responsibility" as the essence of his political philosophy. The idea of the Big Society, championed by Cameron under the 2010 coalition government, proposes "integrating the free market with a theory of social solidarity based on hierarchy and voluntarism" drawing upon "a mix of conservative communitarianism and libertarian paternalism" in principle.

In 2008, Cameron organised a seminar for senior Conservatives with the economist Richard Thaler and began discussing the influence of Thaler's ideas on Conservative policy. Thaler is the co-author with Cass Sunstein of Nudge: Improving Decisions About Health, Wealth, and Happiness, and the pair are informal policy advisors to Barack Obama. Cameron included the book in a 2008 reading list for Conservative MPs.

== Economic policy ==
Cameron has said that it is "essential to reduce taxes on employment and wealth creation in order to enhance our economy's competitiveness. But I don't think it's sensible today to write a Conservative budget for 2009 or 2010, with specific pledges on tax reduction." He has stated that he hoped to cut taxes and raise public spending, "as the economy grows".

=== Air travel ===
Cameron has expressed interest in abolishing Air Passenger Duty for those who travel abroad only rarely, while introducing "frequent flyer" taxes on those who frequently fly around the globe.

Cameron has reportedly come into conflict with London Mayor Boris Johnson over proposed plans for expanding Heathrow Airport, something the mayor opposes and instead favours expansion at Gatwick Airport.

=== Copyright ===
Cameron intends to increase the period of copyright from 50 to 70 years, bring copyright infringing downloads under stronger legal control and require Internet service providers to "block access and indeed close down offending file sharing sites". He supports music industry representatives going into schools to teach children about copyright, technology hindering copyright infringement (DRM), and encourages the music industry to exercise self-censorship on its material in return for the above music industry friendly measures.

=== Environment ===
Cameron has regularly stressed his green credentials since becoming leader, describing himself as "passionate about our environment." He has argued that "there is a price ... for tackling climate change" but it is a "social responsibility to the next generation". He has stated he is committed to achieving the 2010 emissions limit and has announced he would change the current Climate Change Levy to a carbon tax in order to counter global warming. Cameron proposed a Climate Change Bill which would include committing to binding annual carbon reduction targets. However, a memo that was leaked to the Labour Party suggested the binding targets proposal may be dropped, and these do not form part of the proposed Bill as of November 2006.

Cameron has expressed his opposition to Green Taxes in Prime Minister's Questions in October 2013, stating that, in order to cut taxes generally, he would 'roll back' the Green Tax. The 'Big Six' energy companies are advocates of this, according to the Express, in order to avoid Labour's plans for an energy price freeze, which would 'deter much-needed investment' from the energy industry (according to The Daily Telegraph). Labour – on the other hand – implied that Cameron was being hypocritical, because even though he was proposing reducing renewable investment, he had said previously in the 2010 election campaign, '...vote blue to go green...' (in other words, that the Conservatives would be eco-friendly).

The prospect of large-scale solar energy farms being built in the British countryside was discarded by Eric Pickles, the Communities Secretary, on 8 June 2014. At the time, the solar energy industry received £600mn per annum in subsidy. Pickles killed a project because it would have had "major ... adverse impact on the landscape... The loss of a substantial area of productive agricultural land for at least 25 years is another negative factor".

=== Globalisation ===
At a speech in Mumbai in 2006, Cameron said there were depressed towns "where the winds of globalisation [felt] like a chilling blast, not an invigorating breeze". While stressing "the benefits of globalisation", Cameron also argued that globalisation – not immigration – was to blame for lower wages in the UK, and opposed saying "We must also be honest about [globalisation's] costs, because the alternative is that people project their fears and anxieties on to other ethnic groups or other countries."

In a 2013 speech at London Gateway, Cameron rejected the "unthinking embrace of globalisation, exemplified by New Labour, or the timid alternative of go-it-alone Little Englandism", according to Patrick Wintour of The Guardian. Cameron also stated that welfare reform and education reform were necessary in order to compete on the global market, while emphasising national sovereignty and what he perceived to be the UK's role in international affairs.

=== Rail transport ===
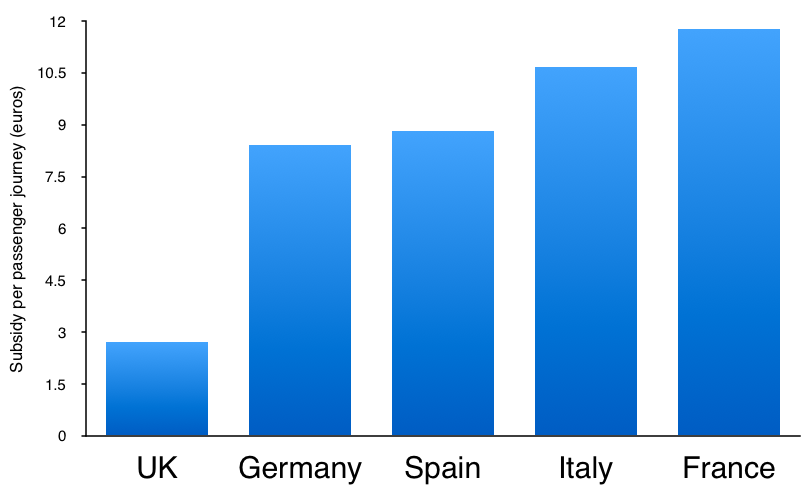
Subsidy per rail passenger journey for UK, Germany, Italy, France and Spain

Following the 2010 General Election, the new Conservative-led Coalition continued Labour's policies on rail transport largely unaltered after a pause to review the finances, keeping the privatised system in place. There was continuing support for the High Speed 2 scheme and further developing plans for the route. Whilst initially showing scepticism towards the electrification of the Great Western route, they later gave the project its backing and work began formally in 2012. Crossrail and the upgrade to Thameslink are due for opening in 2018.

The Government has moved towards allowing more competition on the intercity network through open-access operators. In 2015 it approved a service run by Alliance Rail to operate between London and Blackpool, and both Alliance and FirstGroup have applied to run open access services on the East Coast Main Line.

In January 2015, Cameron said "We've made sure that rail fares cannot go up by more than inflation. So the rail fare increase this year, as last year, is linked to inflation, and I think that's right. In previous years it's gone up by more than inflation. But, of course, what you're seeing on our railways is a £38bn investment project. And that money is coming, of course, from taxpayers, from the government, and from farepayers as well." He said Britain was seeing "the biggest investment in our roads since the 1970s, but in our railways since Victorian times".

=== Regulation ===
Despite initial strong opposition, Cameron has since declared his support for the National Minimum Wage Act 1998 introduced by the Labour Party. More generally though, he has strongly supported deregulation of the private sector, promising an immediate deregulation bill upon election. He has also pledged to remove Britain from the European Union's social chapter and to withdraw unilaterally from certain directives stemming from the European Union. He has said that Britain must not be a "soft touch" and has called for a crackdown on "access to justice".

In November 2013 at the World Islamic Economic Forum, Cameron said it was important for the UK to promote and boost Islamic finance: "I don't just want London to be a great capital of Islamic finance in the western world, I want London to stand alongside Dubai and Kuala Lumpur as one of the great capitals of Islamic finance anywhere in the world." During his speech Cameron said that the UK would become the first sovereign state outside the Islamic world to issue an Islamic 'sukuk' bond. In June 2014, HM Treasury, under direction of Chancellor George Osborne, issued a £200 million Sakk, which was 11.5 times oversubscribed.

=== Taxation and public spending ===
In 2007, the Conservative Party under Cameron's leadership pledged to meet Labour's spending on public services. However, since 2010, the coalition government led by David Cameron issued a nationwide programme of austerity. Comparing coalition austerity measures with the Opposition's, the Financial Times commentator Martin Wolf commented that the "big shift from Labour ... is the cuts in welfare benefits." The government's austerity programme is a series of sustained reductions in public spending, intended to reduce the government budget deficit and the welfare state in the United Kingdom.

However, the health service and education were "ringfenced" and protected from spending cuts, although some (such as Dr Louise Marshall in The Guardian) have questioned as to whether the National Health Service (NHS) really is exempt from austerity measures. In particular, the Health and Social Care Act 2012 caused an increased privatisation of the NHS by 500% in 2014 alone, Paul Evans claims in openDemocracy.

By 2014 the Treasury extended the proposed austerity period until at least 2018.

== Crime and justice ==
=== Capital punishment ===
Cameron opposes the death penalty but does not consider backing it to be unacceptable, saying that "There are MPs who think we should restore the death penalty... I don't happen to take that view but a number of my colleagues do, and a sizable number of people in the country do."

=== Terrorism ===
In 2007, Cameron wrote a piece about his experiences in a national newspaper about his visit with a Muslim family in Birmingham. It turns out he has been leery since before that time of the adjective "Islamist" used to describe the type of terrorism seen in some Muslims:

...many Muslims I've talked to about these issues are deeply offended by the use of the word "Islamic" or "Islamist" to describe the terrorist threat we face today. We do need greater understanding of the true nature of the terrorist threat. There's too much complacency about it among non-Muslims, and too much denial of it in the Muslim community. But our efforts are not helped by lazy use of language. Indeed, by using the word "Islamist" to describe the threat, we actually help do the terrorist ideologues' work for them, confirming to many impressionable young Muslim men that to be a "good Muslim", you have to support their evil campaign.

In July 2014, emergency laws were brought in to force phone and internet companies to hold records of customers' calls, texts and visits to websites, purportedly to defend national security against the terrorist threat from Iraq and Syria in light of the civil war in that part of the world. The legislation brought to domestic shores the Five Eyes program revealed in 2012 by former Booz-Allen contractor Edward Snowden, and were a response to a ruling by the European Court of Justice which struck down mere regulations that forced communications companies to retain metadata for police use for 12 months. MI5 investigations had employed this data over the past decade to catch drug dealers, paedophiles and fraudsters and prevent miscarriages of justice. The legislation carries a 2-year sunset clause.

=== ISIL flag ===
A home ban on the ISIL flag was promised by David Cameron on 16 August 2014, in the wake of the "onslaught of this exceptionally dangerous terrorist movement"; he went so far as to address the issue with the Metropolitan Police Commissioner, Sir Bernard Hogan-Howe:

The position is clear. If people are walking around with Isil flags or trying to recruit people to their terrorist cause, they will be arrested and their materials will be seized. We are a tolerant people, but no tolerance should allow the room for this sort of poisonous extremism in our country.

The ban promised by Cameron was tested to failure not 11 months afterward, when a man and his daughter were photographed on a summer weekend in broad daylight near Parliament Square mere days after the 2015 Sousse attacks. Hogan-Howe now said carrying the black flag of the terrorist organisation was "not necessarily the worst thing in the world", adding that the police should not overreact, while Boris Johnson, then still the Mayor of London, saw no problem with the terrorist flag in the UK because "we live in a free country".

=== Deportation and the ECHR ===
In the context of the successful conviction at trial, which occurred in the state of New York after a lengthy extradition battle in the UK, of Egyptian-born Finsbury Park Mosque hate preacher Abu Hamza Cameron said that:

Obviously, we also need to look, as I've said many times, at the European Convention on Human Rights and the position that we have got to get into where, if someone threatens our country, we should be able to deport them if they have no right to be here and that is absolutely essential that we restore that. We have taken some big steps but I plan to take more steps if I'm elected as a Conservative prime minister after the next election.

Abu Hamza al-Masr, formerly known as Mustafa Kamel Mustafa, had preached at the Finsbury Park mosque after having been jailed for seven years for inciting murder and racial hatred. Hamza was on trial in New York accused of conspiring to set up a terrorist training camp in Oregon and helping abduct two American tourists and 14 other people in Yemen in 1998. More terrorists could be kicked out of the country if it were not for the Liberal Democrats led by Nick Clegg with whom the Conservatives were allied in coalition government between 2010 and 2015, suggested Cameron on 20 May 2014. The Government needed to restore Britain's ability to deport extremists, said Cameron, but it was crucial to overhaul the European Convention of Human Rights to do this. Cameron's proposal to abolish the Human Rights Act 1998 and create a British Bill of Rights would have enabled some of these measures, as well as resolving issues including the rights of terror suspects and the ability of prisoners to vote. However, Cameron has opposed leaving the ECHR altogether.

Cameron had expressed previously his joy at the hate preacher's extradition, and said in October 2012 that the Government must consider ways of stopping similar cases reoccurring:

I'm absolutely delighted that Abu Hamza is now out of this country. Like the rest of the public I'm sick to the back teeth of people who come here, threaten our country, who stay at vast expense to the taxpayer and we can't get rid of them. I'm delighted on this occasion we've managed to send this person off to a country where he will face justice. Now we should learn every lesson. How do we stop these people coming in? How do we get rid of them more quickly? How do we make sure they don't spend so long at taxpayers' expense? I'm as frustrated as the rest of the country when these things happen. I'm delighted that this man at least is on an aeroplane and on his way to face justice.

Cameron had said previously in April 2012 on the occasion of the ECHR decision that facilitated Hamza's extradition: "I am very pleased with the news. It is quite right that we have proper legal processes, although sometimes one can get frustrated with how long they take. I think it is very important that the deportation and expulsion arrangements (work) promptly and properly, particularly when people are accused of very serious crimes."

=== Youth justice and ASBOs ===
In July 2006 Cameron spoke to the Centre for Social Justice in which he highlighted the problem of young offenders and called for more understanding. At the time, the News of the World headlined its report of the speech "Hug a hoodie, says Cameron", coining a phrase which came into popular use, although Cameron never actually used the phrase. Cameron afterwards stated that he never advocated hugging "hoodies" and on 17 May 2007, Cameron labelled the speech as the "most misrepresented thing he had ever said".

Cameron has criticised ASBOs as "reacting" to crime, rather than reducing it, and argued that they should be replaced with "challenging community punishments." In the same speech he also argued that young offenders should be shown "a lot more love" and more understanding into why youths commit crime, specifically calling for more youth counselling, education and training. Cameron was mocked by many Labour MPs for the speech, but he received unexpected backing from right-wing peer Norman Tebbit. Cameron has repeatedly defended his argument, saying that although "I understand, you break the law, you get punished" it was important "to understand what's gone wrong in these children's lives."

== Social policy ==
In a July 2005 speech to the Centre for Social Justice he stated, "the biggest challenge our country faces today is not economic decline, but social decline", stating that in life in Britain "there is a complex web of interconnected problem ... Family breakdown. Persistent unemployment among some groups. Low expectations. Chaotic home environments. Drugs. Crime. Poor quality public space." Upon becoming leader of the Conservative Party, Cameron set up a number of committees, such as the Social Justice Policy Group chaired by Iain Duncan Smith, to generate policy ideas on these issues.

He describes Big Society project as his "great passion"; with 10 Downing Street saying that the policy "create[s] a climate that empowers local people and communities, building a big society that will 'take power away from politicians and give it to people'."

Some commentators have seen the "Big Society" as invoking Edmund Burke's idea of civil society, putting it into the sphere of one-nation conservatism, a legacy which Cameron "eagerly latched" onto, according to Forbes. The idea of a "Big Society" became the flagship policy of the 2010 Conservative Party general election manifesto and formed part of the subsequent legislative programme of the Conservative–Liberal Democrat coalition agreement.

Upon the launch of the "Big Society" on 19 July 2010 it was deemed damaging and unworkable by the Labour Party, the national press, and the country's two largest unions.

=== Counter-Extremism policy ===
In the midst of the bombing campaign of ISIS in Iraq and the raft of murders by fundamentalist Islamic terrorists in the past decade both at home and abroad, Cameron outlined in a speech in July 2015 a plan based on what he termed "liberal values" to counter what he labelled as "extremism". He argued that people were attracted towards extremism for four primary reasons, and later set out four planks of a response. Among other items, he promised a Counter-Extremism Bill, empowered parents to cancel the passports of their children, said that the government would publish a Counter-Extremism Strategy, reiterated his goal to promote identity politics, and offered a revitalised Cohesive Communities Programme.

It has been suggested by David Anderson QC (on behalf of a governmental anti-extremism watchdog) that:

If the wrong decisions are taken, the new [counter-extremism] law risks provoking a backlash in affected communities, hardening perceptions of an illiberal or Islamophobic approach, alienating those whose integration into British society is already fragile, and playing into the hands of those who, by peddling a grievance agenda, seek to drive people further towards extremism and terrorism.

=== Media ===
In May 2007, Cameron viewed the BBC as a means of curbing the spread of Islamism, saying:

... by using the word "Islamist" to describe the threat, we actually help do the terrorist ideologues' work for them, confirming to many impressionable young Muslim men that to be a "good Muslim", you have to support their evil campaign. There's no easy answer. I don't think this is something that can or should be addressed through a government edict, but the BBC, as our national broadcaster, has both the responsibility and the opportunity to give a lead.

=== Abortion ===
Cameron suggested in May 2008 that the current time limit be cut from 24 weeks after conception to 20 weeks.

=== Three-parent babies ===
The question of three-parent embryos or three-person IVF was proposed in December 2014 and passed through Parliament in February 2015. The Parliamentary Under-Secretary of State for Health (Jane Ellison) obtained the support of 382 of her colleagues in this free vote, including David Cameron.

The Chief Medical Officer for England, Professor Dame Sally Davies, encouraged the vote, calling it "an historic day for the future of modern medicine" and remarked that the UK would "become the first country in the world to allow mitochondrial donation techniques to be used in IVF treatment." Michael Nazir-Ali, the former Bishop of Rochester, was very troubled by the technique, and instead urged members to support the negative motion of Fiona Bruce, because "No other country has legalised this procedure for ethical reasons. The procedure would cause the germ-line to be interfered with and changed and human embryos could be destroyed in the process. It is unclear whether the UK would be violating international agreements on germ-line interventions and there has been no informed debate on the issue." In the event, the Bruce motion was un-voteable.

=== Succession to the Throne ===
Female members of the Royal Family will be given equality with men in the rules of succession to the throne, under a new law first proposed in October 2011 by David Cameron. The changes to the laws of succession were finalised with Royal Assent on 25 April 2013. Heirs to the throne will also be free to marry Roman Catholics, a choice which would have required their abdication in years gone by.

=== Forced marriage ===
In June 2012, Cameron promised that forced marriage was to become a criminal offence, and that a package of measures would be put in place to ensure criminalisation does not drive the problem underground. Cameron stated that "Forced marriage is abhorrent and little more than slavery. To force anyone into marriage against their will is simply wrong and that is why we have taken decisive action to make it illegal."

The provisions in the Anti-Social Behaviour, Crime and Policing Act 2014 were enacted in Part 10. These make forced marriage and the breach of a Forced Marriage Prevention Order (FMPO) criminal offences. The statutory changes came into force in June 2014. Breach of an FMPO is punishable in the Crown Court by five years' imprisonment and/or a fine. In the magistrates' court, the maximum prison sentence would be six months.

=== LGBT rights and same-sex marriage ===
Cameron opposed the repeal of Section 28 of the Local Government Act 1988, which banned local authorities from the "promotion of homosexuality". In 2000, Cameron accused Labour Prime Minister Tony Blair of being against family values and of "moving heaven and earth to allow the promotion of homosexuality in our schools". In 2003, once Cameron had been elected as Conservative MP for Witney, he was absent when parliament voted to repeal Section 28. Shortly after becoming leader of the Conservatives, he distanced himself from this stance, saying "I'm glad that it's gone". In 2009, he apologised for previously supporting Section 28.

In 2002, Cameron voted in favour of a bill that would allow unmarried heterosexual couples to adopt children, but which would specifically ban gay couples from adopting. He later voted in favour of civil partnerships for gay men and lesbians in 2004. In 2008, he opposed giving lesbians the right to in vitro fertilisation treatment, stating that they should be required to name a father figure, which received condemnation from LGBT equality groups.

In 2010, David Cameron was given a score of 36% in favour of lesbian, gay and bisexual equality by Stonewall. In his speech at the 2011 Conservative Party Conference, Cameron endorsed same-sex marriage:

I stood before a Conservative conference once and I said it shouldn't matter whether commitment was between a man and a woman, a man and another man or a woman and a woman. You applauded me for that. Five years on, we're consulting on legalising gay marriage. And to anyone who has reservations, I say this: Yes, it's about equality, but it's also about something else: commitment. Conservatives believe in the ties that bind us; that society is stronger when we make vows to each other and support each other. So I don't support gay marriage in spite of being a Conservative. I support gay marriage because I am a Conservative.

The coalition government began a consultation on same-sex marriage. The Marriage (Same Sex Couples) Act 2013 was subsequently passed in 2013 and legalised same-sex marriage in England and Wales. The government also changed the ban on blood donations from men who have had sexual relations with other men from a permanent ban to a one-year ban, though the permanent ban remains in Northern Ireland.

When David Cameron announced his resignation on 13 July 2016, the former Prime Minister said in his speech, "enabling those who love each other to get married whatever their sexuality" was one of his most significant accomplishments.

=== Health ===
Cameron has pledged to develop policies to make the NHS a "more efficient, more effective and more patient-centered service." He wishes to grant the NHS much greater independence from the Department of Health in order to prevent it being used as a "political football" and to create "greater professional responsibility". In January 2007 he called for an "NHS Independence Bill", and asked the Labour leadership to support the bill, after he supported Blair's education reforms.

In 2011 Cameron made five "personal guarantees" on the NHS

- Not to endanger universal coverage – ensuring that it remains a NHS.
- Not to break up or hinder efficient and integrated care, but to improve it.
- Not to lose control of waiting times, ensuring they are kept low.
- Not to cut spending on the NHS, but to increase it.
- Not to sell-off the NHS but to ensure competition benefits patients.

The following year, the Cameron-lead coalition government introduced the Health and Social Care Act 2012, which has been described as the most deep-rooted and extensive reworking of the structure of the National Health Service ever undertaken. The proposals are primarily the result of policies of the then Secretary of State for Health, Andrew Lansley. Writing in The BMJ, Clive Peedell (co-chairman of the NHS Consultants Association and a consultant clinical oncologist) compared the policies with academic analyses of privatisation and found "evidence that privatisation is an inevitable consequence of many of the policies contained in the Health and Social Care Bill".

In 2014, Cameron called for global action to tackle the growing spread of antibiotic resistance, wanting the UK to utilise its pharmaceutical industry to lead the way and bring new drugs to the market. He commissioned economist Jim O'Neill to lead an independent review exploring the economic issues surrounding resistance.

=== Education ===
Cameron has endorsed Labour's creation of city academies, as a way of improving standards in deprived areas. He called on the then government to go "further and faster" with the policy, saying that academies should be given even more freedom from central control. He said the scheme would be greatly extended if he were elected.

He has pledged to give schools much greater independence from government, promising to give them control over admission policy and increase the use of specialist statuses.

Before his election in 2010, Cameron had spoken of busting the public monopoly on education to let new schools be set up, although has not specified what exactly that means.

Under Cameron's premiership the cap on university tuition fees was increased from £3,290 to £9,000 per year which led to student protests nationwide. While it was speculated that the rise would deter poorer young people from higher education, in fact the gap between applications from richer and poorer students decreased after the rise.

=== MPs Expenses ===
During the MPs expenses scandal in 2009, Cameron said he would lead Conservatives in repaying "excessive" expenses and threatened to expel MPs that refused after the expense claims of several members of his shadow cabinet had been questioned

We have to acknowledge just how bad this is, the public are really angry and we have to start by saying, 'Look, this system that we have, that we used, that we operated, that we took part in – it was wrong and we are sorry about that'. (David Cameron 10 May 2009)

=== Disability ===
Cameron stated in 2006 that the government needs to change social attitudes towards disability by setting an example for the private sector. However, and the actions committed by Iain Duncan Smith under Cameron's leadership have been criticised by disability rights activists as disproportionately affecting disabled people. (See "Welfare" section of this article).

=== ID cards ===
Cameron has spoken out against mandatory identity cards on a number of occasions, saying that they did not reduce crime and illegal immigration, were a waste of money and a violation of human rights. The Identity Documents Bill was presented to the House of Commons by Home Secretary Theresa May on 26 May 2010, making the Identity Documents Act the first government bill to be introduced to the 55th Parliament of the United Kingdom under David Cameron.

=== British Hindus ===
Cameron supports referring to British Hindus as a separate ethnic group, refining definition of "Asian" to separate ethnic groups, saying "And if you prefer to be referred to as British Hindus or British Indians rather than as simply Asians, we should welcome that as a positive thing." Cameron's comments are significant because the British Hindu community prefer terms "Hindu" or "Indian" to the ethnic grouping Asian.

=== Fox hunting ===
Cameron is in favour of overturning the 2004 ban on fox hunting and has stated in 2010 and 2015 that a Conservative government under his leadership would give Parliament time for a free vote on the issue. He himself has been fox-hunting on several occasions. He has described the ban on fox-hunting in Britain as one of the issues that made him "furious". In response to this, over 24 MPs have given their support to Conservatives Against Fox Hunting (also known as the "Blue Fox", after the party's colours), described by The Independent as "a campaign group set up to challenge the pro-hunt lobby's influence" in the Conservative Party.

=== Immigration, asylum and integration ===
Cameron has championed the introduction of an upper annual limit of immigration and an increase in the minimum age for foreign nationals to join spouses in the UK to 21. According to José Manuel Barroso, the President of the European Commission, Cameron's immigration policy would be illegal under EU law. The High Court also declared the minimum age for foreign spouses to be unlawful. He has called for the introduction of a British Border Control police force, quotas for asylum seekers and all asylum claims to be assessed in overseas centres. If necessary, the party under his leadership would "tear up its commitments under the 1951 UN Convention on Refugees to get its way."

In January 2010, prior to the election that brought him to power in May 2010, Cameron said in response to George Carey, the former Archbishop of Canterbury, who worried about strain on the British tradition of hospitality: "In the last decade, net immigration in some years has been sort of 200,000, so implying a 2 million increase over a decade, which I think is too much. We would like to see net immigration in the tens of thousands rather than the hundreds of thousands. I don't think that's unrealistic. That's the sort of figure it was in the 1990s and I think we should see that again."

In February 2011, Cameron said in response to a question in the House of Commons that too many children from immigrant families are not able to speak English when they start at school, that the parents of immigrant children had "a responsibility and an obligation" to ensure it, and that the UK must go further to ensure those settling learn English "so they can be more integrated into our country". He agreed parents should be responsible for making sure children speak English. Cameron also said: "If you look at the figures for the number of people who are brought over as husbands and wives, particularly from the Indian sub-continent, we should be putting in place – and we will be putting in place – tougher rules to make sure they do learn English and so when they come, if they come, they can be more integrated into our country."

Also in February 2011, the UK Border Agency was upbraided by an independent Government inspector because immigration staff were failing to take action against hundreds of migrant workers who have no right to stay in Britain. Chief Inspector John Vine reported that the visas of migrants whose jobs had ended were not being cancelled, and found that insufficient checks were being carried out on companies which sponsor overseas workers.

In April 2011, Cameron delivered a speech on the government's immigration policy, which sparked a row with coalition partner Liberal Democrat Business Secretary Vince Cable, and which he concluded as follows: "But with us, our borders will be under control and immigration will be at levels our country can manage. No ifs. No buts. That's a promise we made to the British people. And it's a promise we are keeping."

It was reported by the Office for National Statistics in August 2013 that the net number of immigrants arriving in Britain was 176,000 in the 12 months to the end of December 2012, up from 153,000 the previous year.

In a speech in October 2013, Cameron said that schools must produce young people who are 'fully capable' of doing work in a manufacturing facility, a cap on the number of migrants from outside the EU was part of the government's attempt to substantially reduce levels of net migration, and:

You can go round factories in the country where half of the people in the factory have come from Poland, Lithuania or Latvia. You can't blame them. They have got to work hard. They see the jobs, they come over and they do them. But as a country, what we ought to be saying is no. Let's get our education system right so we are producing people out of our schools and colleges who are fully capable of doing those jobs which are being made available. Second, let's reform the welfare system so it does not pay to be out of work and it pays you to be in work. And thirdly, let's have the sensible controls on immigration.

In May 2014, the Cameron government passed the Immigration Act 2014. In her May 2014 appearance on the Andrew Marr show, Home Secretary Theresa May blamed the Liberal Democrats coalition partners for the immigration target failure, when it was reported by the Office for National Statistics that the net influx of immigrants had risen to 212,000 in the year to December 2013, from 177,000 the previous year.

In November 2014, Home Secretary Theresa May made clear government is preparing for public admission of failure to cut net migration to tens of thousands. The pledge made by Cameron to reduce annual net migration to below 100,000 during this parliament had "begun to publicly unravel"; May said that Cameron's "no ifs, no buts" passage in April 2011 was just a "comment" while another spokesman described it as an "objective".

As the General Election of 2015 drew near, the ONS revealed an increase from 210,000 to 298,000 in the net number of immigrants taken in over the course of the year to September. The immigrant influx had risen in a "statistically significant" way to 624,000 in the year to September from 530,000 in the previous 12 months. There were significant increases in immigration of non-EU citizens, for whom a visa is required and over whom control is domestic, up 49,000 to 292,000. A journalist commented that "Today's figures are the final nail in the coffin for the promise made by Prime Minister David Cameron and Home Secretary Theresa May to slash net migration to below 100,000 by the end of the current parliamentary term." An opposition politician said Mr Cameron's immigration target was "now in tatters".

==== Integration ====
As early as May 2007 Cameron saw the Muslim community as a solution to family breakdown, crime and incivility:

And the third step in promoting integration is to ensure there's something worth integrating into. 'To make men love their country,' said Edmund Burke, 'their country ought to be lovable.' Integration has to be about more than immigrant communities, 'their' responsibilities and 'their' duties. It has to be about 'us' too – the quality of life that we offer, our society and our values. Here [in the UK] the picture is bleak: family breakdown, drugs, crime and incivility are part of the normal experience of modern Britain. Many British Asians see a society that hardly inspires them to integrate. Indeed, they see aspects of modern Britain which are a threat to the values they hold dear – values which we should all hold dear. Asian families and communities are incredibly strong and cohesive, and have a sense of civic responsibility which puts the rest of us to shame. Not for the first time, I found myself thinking that it is mainstream Britain which needs to integrate more with the British Asian way of life, not the other way around.

=== Welfare ===
UK Government welfare expenditure 2011–12

- State pension (46.32%)
- Housing Benefit (10.55%)
- Disability Living Allowance (7.87%)
- Pension Credit (5.06%)
- Income Support (4.31%)
- Rent rebates (3.43%)
- Attendance allowance (3.31%)
- Jobseeker's Allowance (3.06%)
- Incapacity Benefit (3.06%)
- Council Tax Benefit (3%)
- Other (10.03%)

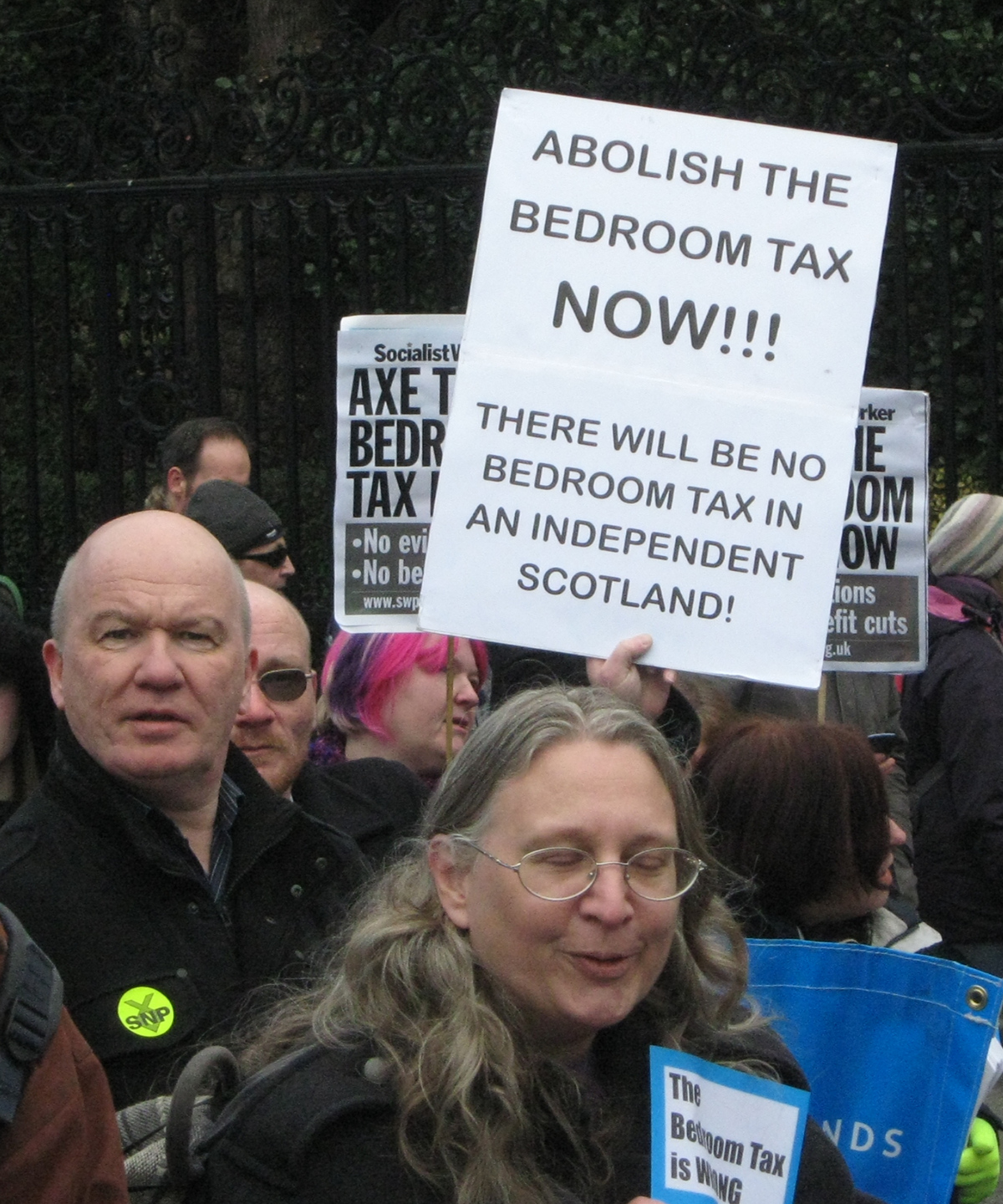
Protesters opposing the bedroom tax outside the Scottish Parliament.

Cameron has argued passionately for limits in welfare payments and in favour of individual initiative. Alongside the tougher medical tests, he proposes requiring all people receiving Jobseeker's Allowance to join a return to work programme and prevent people who refuse a job offer while on benefits from claiming for three years. People who claim benefits for two out of three years would be required to join a community work scheme. He strongly believed in the centrality of work to life and the duty of every citizen and resident to work full-time hours in either one full-time job or several part-time jobs from adolescence into old age.

The government's austerity programme, which involves reduction in government welfare spending, has been linked to a rise in food banks. A study published in The British Medical Journal in 2015 found that each 1 percentage point increase in the rate of Jobseeker's Allowance claimants sanctioned was associated with a 0.09 percentage point rise in food bank use. The austerity programme's welfare cuts have faced opposition from disability rights groups for disproportionately affecting disabled people. The bedroom tax is an austerity measure that has attracted particular criticism, with activists arguing that two thirds of council houses affected by the policy are occupied with a person with a disability.

==== Welfare Reform and Work Bill ====
One of these reforms was the Welfare Reform and Work Bill, supported by Iain Duncan Smith (Secretary of State for Work and Pensions) and the Conservative Party. Many people have criticised the bill, with some even going as far as to defining it as a "Pandora's box for Britain's poorest families". The cuts to tax credits have been criticised for unfairly disadvantaging the working poor, and a clause in the bill allows the benefits cap of £20,000 (£23,000 in London) to be reduced further, without any consultation with Parliament, thus making those from larger families even worse off. It also called for £12bn to be made in cuts, in accordance with the government's policy of austerity.

Harriet Harman (then acting as Leader of the Labour Party) ordered her Labour MPs to abstain from the vote for the bill as opposed to voting against it – a move which United States-based magazine The Nation said "underline[d] Labour's moral and intellectual bankruptcy". The former Leader of the Labour Party, Jeremy Corbyn, voted against the bill, alongside 48 Labour MPs who defied the orders of Harman. Other parties in opposition to the bill were the Scottish National Party (who said that the Bill was "...an attack on civil society, it's an attack on our poorest and hard working families, and it's a regressive Bill that takes us back in time with cuts that will hit women and children the hardest"), the Liberal Democrats, the Democratic Unionist Party (Northern Ireland), Plaid Cymru and the Greens.

==== Poverty ====
In 2006 Cameron described poverty as a "moral disgrace" and also promised to tackle relative poverty. In 2007 Cameron promised, "We can make British poverty history, and we will make British poverty history". Also in 2007 he stated "Ending child poverty is central to improving child well-being".

The Cameron government plans welfare cuts which official government advisors warn are set to increase child poverty. The Children's Commissioner expects the number of children in poverty to rise by roughly one million over five years. Polly Toynbee claimed in The Guardian that reductions in child tax credits were likely to increase child poverty among working families with low wages. Anna Feuchtwang of the National Children's Bureau claims too little was done to implement the Conservative manifesto promise to give every child the best start in life. Gareth Jenkins of Save the Children fears the effect cuts will have on life chances of children in poor families, saying "Our biggest concern would be that increases in financial hardship for the poorest working families will only further worsen the chances of their children to do well at school and escape the circumstances they were born into – a key goal of the Conservative government."

In 2015, George Eaton writing in the New Statesman claimed the two-year freeze in working-age benefits by the Cameron government will increase poverty among wage earners. He claimed that removal of Housing Benefit for those between 18 and 25, reductions in housing benefit for people with spare bedrooms, caps on housing benefit and other changes will further add to poverty and homelessness.

The July 2015 budget under the Cameron government reduced funds to help disabled people find work. For example, Jamie McCormack, who is deaf and physically disabled, wrote in The Independent that removing specialist advisers from jobcentres and ending of funding for tailored support reduced his work opportunities. He also believes ending student maintenance grants prevents him going to university. According to him and Anoosh Chakelian of the New Statesman, removal of 'the disability element of Employment and Support Allowance (ESA)' will cause stress and hardship to many disabled people.

Under Cameron's leadership, poverty is no longer classified by a family's income, but as to whether a family is in work or not. Considering that two-thirds of people who found work were accepting wages that are below the living wage (according to the Joseph Rowntree Foundation), this has been criticised by anti-poverty campaigners as an unrealistic view of poverty in Britain today.

== Foreign policy ==
Cameron has stated that he believes in "spreading freedom and democracy, and supporting humanitarian intervention" in cases such as the genocide in Darfur, Sudan. However, he says that he is not a neo-conservative because, as a conservative, he recognises "the complexities of human nature, and will always be skeptical of grand schemes to remake the world." He supports multilateralism stating "a country may act alone – but it cannot always succeed alone." He believes multilateralism can take the form of acting through "NATO, the UN, the G8, the EU and other institutions", or through international alliances. Cameron has also argued that "If the West is to help other countries, we must do so from a position of genuine moral authority" and "we must strive above all for legitimacy in what we do."

Cameron advanced a less activist interventionist policy before becoming Prime Minister, but in the event intervened abroad more frequently than Tony Blair's administration had done.

=== United States ===
Cameron has supported the alliance with the United States, viewing it as highly important. He has praised its role in the Second World War and the Cold War, about which he has said "Unlike some, I never had any doubts about whose side I was on". This was interpreted as a knock at sections of the Labour Party, some members of which had expressed support for the former Soviet Union. He has also claimed "we must be steadfast not slavish in how we approach the special relationship", arguing that "questioning the approach of the U.S. administration, trying to learn the lessons of the past five years, does not make you anti-American."

=== Israel ===
Cameron also supports Israel, claiming that he felt "some sense of connection" to Israel due to his "relatively limited" Jewish ancestry. Cameron has described the state as being "a lone democracy in a region that currently boasts no others." He is a member of and has spoken for the Conservative Friends of Israel group. However he criticised the country's 2006 missile attacks on Lebanon, describing the force used as "disproportionate." Regarding East Jerusalem and Israeli settlements in the region, he said in 2016 that:

I am well-known as being a strong friend of Israel but I have to say the first time I visited Jerusalem and had a proper tour around that wonderful city and saw what has happened with the effective encirclement of East Jerusalem – occupied East Jerusalem – it is genuinely shocking. What this government has consistently done and gone on doing is saying yes, we are supporters of Israel, but we do not support illegal settlements, we do not support what is happening in East Jerusalem and it's very important that this capital city is maintained in the way that it was in the past.

=== Argentina and the Falkland Islands ===
Cameron clashed regularly with President of Argentina Cristina Fernández de Kirchner over the Falkland Islands' sovereignty. In 2011, she called Cameron "arrogant, mediocre and stupid". At the 2012 G20 Los Cabos summit in Mexico, the two had a verbal exchange in which Cameron refused to accept the brown envelope containing a letter from Fernández de Kirchner. In 2013, in response to Argentina's calls for negotiations over the Falkland Islands' sovereignty, a referendum was called asking Falkland Islanders whether they supported the continuation of their status as an Overseas Territory of the United Kingdom. With a turnout of 91.94%, an overwhelming 99.8% voted to remain a British territory with only three votes against.

In light of this Cameron said:

We believe in the Falkland islanders' right to self-determination. They had a referendum. They couldn't have been more clear about wanting to remain with our country and we should protect and defend them.

=== Iraq and the war on terror ===
Before becoming leader, he voted in favour of the Iraq War, confirming this stance during an interview on the British TV show Friday Night with Jonathan Ross. In defence of the Iraq situation, he stated, "You've got to do what you think is right even if it's unpopular, that's the only thing you can do". Subsequently, he supported a motion brought by the SNP and Plaid Cymru on 31 October 2006, calling for an inquiry into the government's conduct of the Iraq war. This was after the government informed the Conservatives that an inquiry would not be accepted in 2007, the initial policy call of the party. The motion was defeated by a margin 25 votes, 273 MPs voting in favour and 298 against. He was criticised for this in The Times. He was also criticised by some Conservative MPs who claimed it was irresponsible to support an inquiry while British troops were still involved.

Cameron supports the war on terror. He has praised it for the removal of "two of the world's most repressive regimes", Libya's abandonment of nuclear weapons procurement, and Syria's withdrawal from Lebanon. He has argued "it must be a battle of hearts and minds, as well as force" and that "the threat cannot be negotiated away or appeased – it has to be confronted and overcome".

=== Syria ===
Cameron's government was critical of Bashar al-Assad's government in the Syrian civil war stating it had "forfeited the right to lead" by "miring itself in the blood of innocent people", and backed the rebels. On 21 August 2013, immediately following a chemical-weapons attack at Ghouta, Cameron urged U.S. President Barack Obama to respond with a military intervention. However a motion to participate in military strikes against the Syrian regime was defeated in Parliament on 29 August 2013. This was the first time that a British government was blocked from taking a military action by Parliament. After the vote Cameron said:

"I strongly believe in the need for a tough response to the use of chemical weapons but I also believe in respecting the will of this House of Commons ... It is clear to me that the British Parliament, reflecting the views of the British people, does not want to see British military action. I get that and the Government will act accordingly."

Ultimately a negotiated agreement was reached to eliminate Syria's chemical weapons.

In December 2015, Cameron won support from the House of Commons for airstrikes against ISIS in Syria.

=== Libya ===
In 2011, the United Kingdom joined the NATO forces that took part in a military intervention against Libya. Hostilities ended only after the death of dictator Muammar Gaddafi in October 2011. Cameron supported this international action. He said it was "right because we believe we should not stand aside while this dictator murders his own people." When the fighting ceased in October 2011, there was a leadership vacuum in Libya and Cameron as well as the other western powers did not really exert much effort to fill this vacancy. Libya was plunged in civil war and United States President Barack Obama pointed a finger at Cameron for not helping rebuild Libya.

China

Cameron famously heralded a “golden era” of economic relations with China. He vowed in 2013 to champion an EU-China trade deal with as much determination as championing the EU-U.S. trade deal. Cameron gained credit for The Golden Era of relations between the UK and China because of his repeated emphasis on mutual benefits in trade, investment and cultural exchanges between the two.

=== European Union ===
Immediately following his election as leader, he restated his pledge to withdraw the party's MEPs from cooperation with the European People's Party (EPP) within the European Parliament. The British Conservative Party were part of the anti-federalist European Democrats, a sub-group of the EPP-ED Group in the European Parliament, but Cameron planned for the ED to break away in order to form a new, independent grouping. Cameron aimed to set up a group more focused on the Conservative Party's views, a move that has been resisted by some Conservative MEPs and all mainstream Conservative member-parties of the EPP. After much speculation, he announced in July 2006 that Conservative MEPs would withdraw from the EPP in 2009. The stated reason for the delay was that the Conservatives' proposed future alliance partners, the Czech Civic Democratic Party, needed time to form a new domestic coalition in order to form a "eurorealist" grouping in the European Parliament. At the EU level, the Conservatives are currently associated with the Alliance of European Conservatives and Reformists (ECR) group, which "contains parties that follow a broadly Eurosceptic line" and "focuses on promoting inter-governmentalism over supra-nationalism, and pushing for development of free market policies".

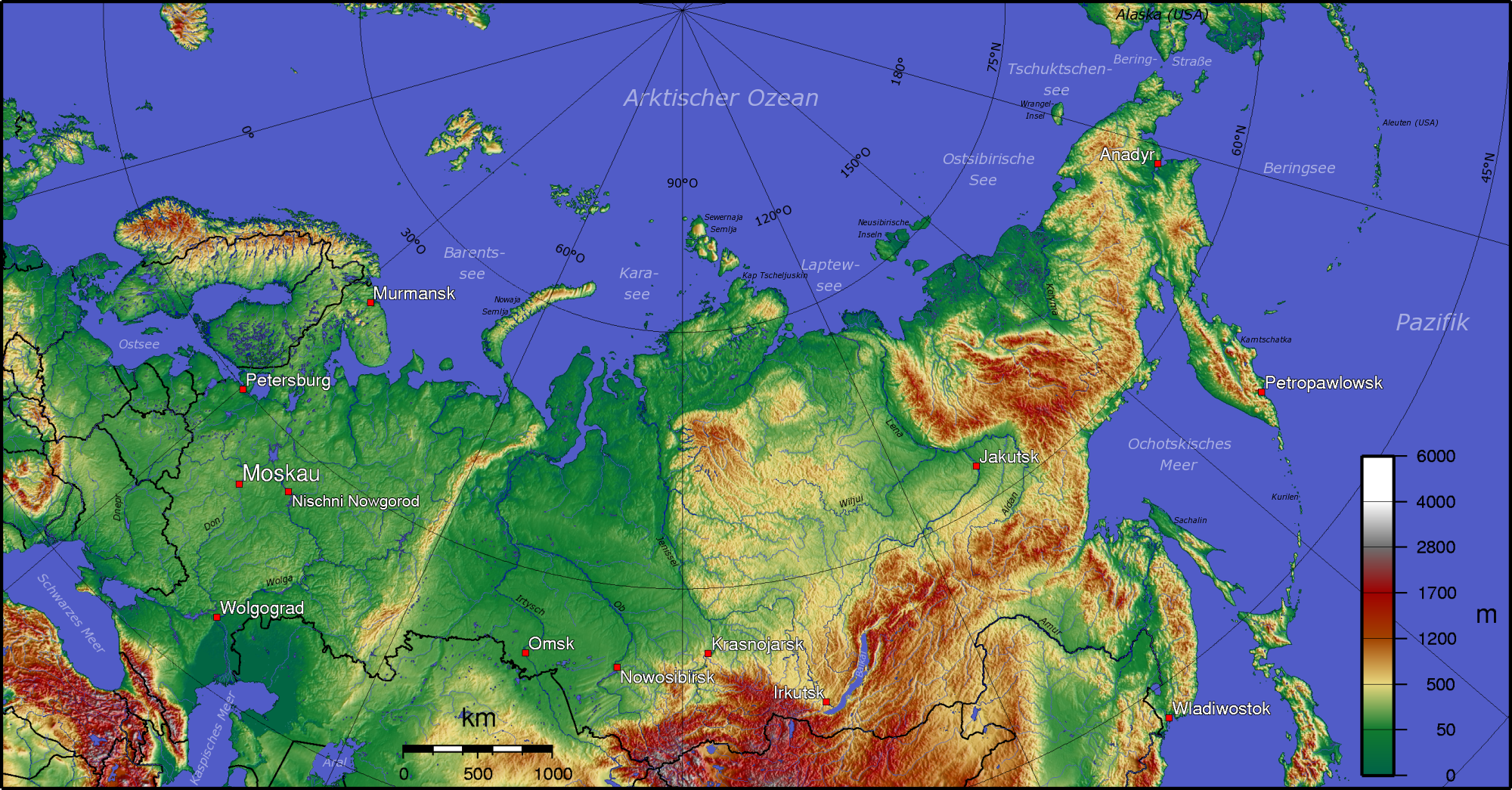
The Ural Mountains are seen here in the yellowish line that runs along approximately 60th longitude East. By reference, St. Petersburg and Kyiv are on the 30th longitude East, while London is at nil degrees.

Cameron was against unilaterally withdrawing from the European Union's Common Fisheries Policy, as some on the Conservative Right have proposed. In fact Mr. Cameron's very first policy change as leader was to scrap the party's pledge to withdraw from Common Fisheries Policy as his legal aides advised him it would mean complete withdrawal from the EU would be necessary to facilitate this.

In an April 2013 interview with a Spanish daily, Cameron stated his reformation plans for the EU as follows below. However, in a February 2014 interview, EU Commission President José Manuel Barroso said that Cameron had to that date made no proposals.

On 1 July 2013, Cameron outlined his "vision of the EU is that it should be a large trading and co-operating organisation that effectively stretches, as it were, from the Atlantic to the Urals. We have a wide vision of Europe and have always encouraged countries that want to join," as he welcomed the 28th member of the union (Croatia) to the fold while he spoke to Kazakh university students. The speech was characterised as a "hugely provocative pro-EU" one by some observers. Cameron "hailed the power of the EU to transform divided societies," whereas President of Russia Vladimir Putin "may regard Cameron's remarks as hostile. Putin believes that the EU should extend no further into the former USSR than the Baltic states."

The Eastern Partnership is planned to link Europe and former Soviet states in a free trade and political accord.

The European Union–Ukraine Association Agreement (UkEUAA) was rejected by President Viktor Yanukovych at a summit in Vilnius on 21 November 2013. This sparked months of protest and turmoil, and culminated with regime change in Kyiv on 21 February 2014. Cameron spoke after the European Council meeting of 21 March 2014, at which the UkEUAA was finally signed by PM pro-tem Arseniy Yatsenyuk, of the EU plans, under the Eastern Partnership, to "further strengthen the political association and economic integration with Republic of Georgia and the Republic of Moldova, (and) to sign the association agreements, including the deep and comprehensive free trade areas (DCFTAs) ... no later than June 2014."

On 27 June 2014, the new President of Ukraine, Petro Poroshenko, signed in Brussels the remainder of the UkEUAA (see below for the DCFTA), while Georgia and Moldova both signed onto the Eastern Partnership.

David Cameron proposed a referendum on the UK's EU continuing membership on 23 June 2016, following negotiations and a package of changes agreed by the EU. On 24 June 2016, the United Kingdom voted to leave the European Union.

=== Turkey in the EU ===
On 9 December 2014, Cameron said that he still "very much supports" Turkey joining the European Union, during a visit to Turkey to meet the country's Prime Minister and President, despite his Government's inability to control numbers of EU migrants coming to the UK. The visit was his first since 2010 when he told the Turks he backed the country's goal of joining the EU. He had said then that he wanted to "make the case" for Turkey's EU membership, and added that he wanted to "pave the road" for Turkey to join the EU, saying the country was "vital for our economy, vital for our security and vital for our diplomacy". On 22 May 2016, Cameron said that "it is not remotely on the cards that Turkey is going to join the EU any time soon. They applied in 1987. At the current rate of progress they will probably get round to joining in about the year 3000 according to the latest forecasts."

=== India ===
Cameron has been a strong advocate of increased ties between India and the United Kingdom; describing Indian – British relations as the "New Special Relationship" in 2010.

In October 2012, as Narendra Modi rose to prominence in India, the UK rescinded its boycott of the then Gujarat state Chief Minister, and in November 2013, Cameron commented that he was "open" to meeting Modi.

Modi was later elected as Prime Minister in a landslide majority, leading to Cameron calling Modi and congratulating him on the "election success", one of the first Western leaders to do.

=== Sri Lanka ===
Cameron reiterated calls for an independent investigation into the alleged war crimes during the final stages of the Sri Lankan Civil War. "There needs to be proper inquiries into what happened at the end of the war, there needs to be proper human rights, democracy for the Tamil minority in that country" Cameron stated. He stated that, if this investigation was not completed by March 2014, he would press for an independent international inquiry. This followed a visit to Jaffna, a war-ravaged town in the northern part of Sri Lanka; Cameron was the first foreign leader to visit Jaffna since the island once colonised by Britain became independent in 1948. Cameron was mobbed by demonstrators, mostly women, seeking his assistance in tracing missing relatives.

=== 2014 Russian annexation of Crimea ===
On 16 March in the 2014 Crimean crisis, a referendum was held in Crimea, which resulted in a vote to join Russia. This elicited, two days later, a formal response from the President of the Russian Federation, Vladimir Putin, to set in motion the machinery that had been prepared in the Russian Parliament. On 21 March, the UK government issued an unbidden rebuttal, that rehashed the Western point of view.

President Viktor Yanukovych was ousted from power on 21 February by the 2014 Ukrainian revolution and replaced by Oleksandr Turchynov, the screenwriter and economist, and the Yatsenyuk Government was endorsed by the Rada. At a European Council summit in Brussels on 21 March 2014, new Ukrainian Prime Minister Arseniy Yatsenyuk and European Union leaders Herman Van Rompuy and José Manuel Barroso, along with the 27 national political leaders or heads of state on the Council, which included Cameron, signed the political provisions of the European Union–Ukraine Association Agreement. The Deep and Comprehensive Free Trade Area was to be signed following the presidential election in May 2014.

== Constitutional issues ==
Cameron is a Unionist although he supports devolution, admitting that the Conservatives, "fought against the idea of a Scottish Parliament long after it became clear that it was the settled will of the people." He has also defended the Barnett formula, saying "Other areas within the UK are subsidised more than Scotland is." Currently Scotland has a net compared to the rest of the UK. He also believes "unionists have to develop better arguments against independence", and that "the case for the Union isn't just economic." Cameron has stated that he wants to address anti-Scottishness in England, "Scotland has certainly not been an occupied or oppressed country these past three hundred years but I recognise that it has not all been a triumphal procession either", and that, "the ignorance of English people about Scots and Scotland", has sometimes meant that Scotland does not get "the respect it deserves."

On the West Lothian question, he has criticised the ability of Scottish MPs to vote on English matters, "We need to make devolution work ... one part of devolution that doesn't work is that Scottish MPs can vote on matters that don't affect their own constituents", and has asked the party's Commission on Democracy, led by Kenneth Clarke, to look at possible solutions.

Cameron has announced that he would scrap the Human Rights Act 1998 which came into force in 2000. Instead, it would be replaced with a Bill of Rights, based on "British needs and traditions". However, he has said that the country would remain a signatory of the European Convention on Human Rights, upon which the Human Rights Act is based.

He has also called for investigations into ministerial misconduct to be a "genuinely independent mechanism" after cabinet minister Tessa Jowell's husband was part of an alleged fraud inquiry. Additionally, in order to "clean up", he says ministers should not be allowed to set their expenses or salaries. Cameron has also called for a reduction in the number of Members of Parliament in the House of Commons.

=== Voting reform ===
Cameron declared on 26 May 2009 that his party does not support the AV+ system, or any other form of proportional representation, as it would end up choosing a government "on the basis of secret backroom deals". However, he pledged to hold a referendum on changing the method of electing MPs from first past the post to alternative vote upon forming government in 2010.

== Criticism of other parties and politicians ==
Upon his election as leader of the Conservative Party, Cameron declared that he was "fed up with the Punch and Judy politics of Westminster, the name calling, backbiting, point scoring, finger pointing."

However, in a war of words with the UK Independence Party (UKIP), Cameron accused its members of being "fruitcakes, loonies and closet racists, mostly," causing UKIP MEP Nigel Farage to demand an apology for the remarks. Right-wing Conservative MP Bob Spink also criticised the remarks, as did The Daily Telegraph.

Cameron has also criticised ex-Prime Minister Gordon Brown (Chancellor of the Exchequer at the time) for being "an analogue politician in a digital age" and repeatedly refers to him as "the roadblock to reform". He has also said that John Prescott "clearly looks a fool" in light of allegations of ministerial misconduct. During a speech to the Ethnic Media Conference in November 2006, Cameron described Ken Livingstone, then Mayor of London, as an "ageing far left politician" in reference to Livingstone's views on multiculturalism. He said that Livingstone saw minorities as "potential agents of revolutionary change", not equals wanting a better life.

However, Cameron encouraged Conservative MPs to join the unprecedented standing ovation to Tony Blair at the end of his last Prime Minister's Question Time; he had paid tribute to the "huge efforts" Blair had made and said Blair had "considerable achievements to his credit, whether it is peace in Northern Ireland or his work in the developing world, which will endure".

== See also ==
- Premiership of David Cameron – Period of the Government of the United Kingdom from 2010 to 2016
- Cameron–Clegg coalition – Government of the United Kingdom (2010–2015)
- Second Cameron ministry – Government of the United Kingdom (2015–2016)
- Politics of the United Kingdom
