= Means test =

Determination of whether an individual or family is eligible for government assistance

A means test is a determination of whether an individual or family is eligible to receive government benefits, assistance, or welfare, based upon a determination of their financial situation, i.e. their income and assets. A means-tested program is generally one in which eligibility is limited to people whose income falls below a particular determined threshold, such as the poverty line. Such programs are usually financed via tax revenues. Means testing is in opposition to universal coverage, in which benefits are extended to everyone. Means testing increases the administrative burden and can create perverse incentives, such as a poverty trap.

== By country ==
=== Canada ===
In Canada, means tests are used for student finance (for post-secondary education), legal aid, and "welfare" (direct transfer payments to individuals to combat poverty). They are not generally used for primary and secondary education which are tax-funded. Means tests for public health insurance were once common but are now illegal, as the Canada Health Act of 1984 requires that all the provinces provide universal healthcare coverage to be eligible for subsidies from the federal government. Means tests are also not used for pensions and seniors' benefits, but there is a clawback of Old Age Security payments for people making over $69,562 (in 2012). The Last Post Fund uses a means test on a deceased veteran's estate and surviving widow to determine whether they are eligible for federal funding to subsidize their funeral.

=== United Kingdom ===
Resentment over a means test was among the factors giving rise to the National Unemployed Workers' Movement in the United Kingdom. The means test was introduced in 1931 to cut benefit spending by assessing the total income and possessions of an entire household, rather than just the individual claimant "the government had reduced unemployment benefit and had introduced a means test." It was highly controversial because it often penalized those who had small savings or relied on family support, this lead to protest from the unemployed who felt that this test blamed them for their own poverty. The means test also had applicants prove that they were "genuinely seeking work," this is something that greatly impacted women "pressure to equalize male and female benefits." and was eventually outlawed. Today, means-tested benefits—meaning that entitlement is affected by the amount of income, savings, capital and assets— is a central feature of the benefit system. Means testing is also part of the determination of legal aid in a magistrates court and for the higher Crown Court. The means test is based on income, family circumstances and essential living costs. The Beveridge Report of 1942 proposed a system of contributory benefits which would leave only a residual role for means-tested benefits which were then called National Assistance. The income limits are specified in relation to the needs of a household and for savings there are upper limits for some of the benefits. A couple who are not married may be treated as living together as a married couple.

The main means-tested benefits in 2019 were:

- Income Support
- Income-based Jobseeker's Allowance
- Income-related Employment and Support Allowance
- Pension Credit
- Universal Credit
- Housing Benefit
- Working Tax Credit
- Child Tax Credit

Receipt of such benefits other than Housing Benefit and tax credits is a passport to other non-cash help such as free school meals, free prescription charges, Legal Aid, cold weather payment. The claimant, their partner and dependent children are covered. The rules for free NHS dentistry and optical charges have become more complex since the introduction of Universal Credit and have led to many people facing financial penalties, often wrongly. People who are not entitled to any of the qualifying benefits may be able to qualify for help with health charges by a separate means test, the NHS Low Income Scheme. Defunct benefits include:

- National Assistance
- Supplementary Benefit
- Family Credit
- Family Income Supplement
- Social Fund (UK)

=== United States ===
Means testing is used to test for eligibility to Medicaid, Temporary Assistance for Needy Families, Section 8 housing, Supplemental Nutrition Assistance Program, Pell Grant, Federal Supplemental Educational Opportunity Grant, Federal Work-Study Program, direct subsidized student loans, as well as the eligibility for relief for debtors who have sufficient financial means to pay a portion of their debts. The means test is perhaps best recognized in the United States as the test used by courts to determine eligibility for Title 11 of the United States Code Chapter 7 or Chapter 13 bankruptcy.

During the Great Depression in the 1930s, the test was used to screen applicants for such programs as Home Relief, and starting in the 1960s, for benefits such as those provided by Medicaid and the Food Stamp Program.

In 1992, third-party presidential candidate Ross Perot proposed that future Social Security benefits be subjected to a means test; though some viewed it as a potential solution to the program's potential insolvency, few other political candidates since Perot have publicly made the same suggestion, which would require costly investigations, might associate accepting those benefits with social stigma, may worsen the poverty trap, and demotivate people from saving or otherwise improving their conditions.

==== Bankruptcy ====
In 2005, the US substantially changed its bankruptcy laws, adding a means test to prevent wealthy debtors from filing for Chapter 7 Bankruptcy. The most noteworthy change brought by the 2005 BAPCPA amendments occurred within 11 U.S.C. § 707(b). The amendments effectively subject most debtors who make an income, as calculated by the Code, above the median income of the debtor's state to an income-based test. This is referred to as the "means test." The means test provides for a finding of abuse if the debtor's income is higher than a specified portion of their debts. If a presumption of abuse is found under the means test, it may be rebutted only in the case of "special circumstances."

Debtors whose income is below the state's median income are not subject to the means test. The code-calculated income may be higher or lower than the debtor's actual income at the time of filing for bankruptcy. This has led some commentators to refer to the bankruptcy code's "current monthly income" as "presumed income". If the debtor's debt is not primarily consumer debt, then the means test is inapplicable.

Thus, the means test is a formula designed to keep filers with higher incomes from filing for Chapter 7 bankruptcy. These filers may use Chapter 13 bankruptcy to repay a portion of their debts but may not use Chapter 7 to wipe out their debts altogether. The bankruptcy means test is complex and the terms that govern many parts of it – including those terms that control whether it applies at all – are of unsettled definition.

=== Other ===
Other examples of means testing include Medifund in Singapore and medical cards in Ireland. Both are used in the healthcare sector. Australia uses a means test for its Age Pension.

== See also ==
- Conditional cash transfer
- Entitlement
- Entitlement theory
- Personal Responsibility and Work Opportunity Act
- Social insurance
- Social welfare
- To each according to his needs
