= NHS Low Income Scheme =

The NHS Low Income Scheme is intended to reduce the cost of NHS prescription charges, NHS dentistry, sight tests, glasses and contact lenses, necessary costs of travel to receive NHS treatment, NHS wigs and fabric supports, i.e. spinal or abdominal supports or surgical brassieres supplied through a hospital. It is administered by the NHS Business Services Authority. It is not necessary to be in receipt of any benefits in order to qualify.

An online application system was under trial in 2022. It is restricted to people who do not have capital or savings of over £6,000.

== Tax credits ==
People entitled to most means-tested benefits do not need to use the scheme as they are exempt from these charges. People who receive working tax credit or child tax credit are automatically assessed and, if entitled, issued with an NHS Tax Credit Exemption Certificate. Tax credit beneficiaries with an income of less than £15,276 (2013 figure), people who receive working tax credit and child tax credit and those who receive working tax credit with a disability element are entitled to a certificate.

== Universal Credit ==
The introduction of Universal Credit led to complications. People entitled to Universal Credit who had net earnings of less than £435 in a month (or £935 or less if they have a child element or had limited capability for work) should receive free prescriptions on the same basis as other people in receipt of other means tested benefits. However, as of December 2017, at which point the introduction of universal credit (which started in April 2013) was well under way, the prescription form did not mention it. Claimants were officially advised by NHS England to tick the box for income-based jobseeker's allowance.

== Outside England ==
Charges are not made for prescriptions, wigs or fabric supports in Scotland or Wales.

== Financial assessment ==
The assessment of means uses similar principles to those of income support. Weekly income is compared to assessed requirements but includes housing costs and council tax which income support does not. There is a capital limit (between the claimant and their partner, if they have one) of £23,250 for those permanently in a care home (£24,000 in Wales) and £16,000 for everyone else.

== Certificates ==
The HC2 certificate for full help (which includes free NHS prescriptions), is issued if weekly income is less than or equal to requirements, or income is greater than requirements by no more than half the current English prescription charge. The HC3 certificate for partial help is issued if income is greater than requirements by more than half the current English prescription charge. This shows the payment liability for health costs. It is possible to apply for a refund of charges already paid when an application for a certificate is made. HC1 refers to the form used to claim eligibility under the scheme.
