= Federation of Manufacturing Opticians =

The Federation of Manufacturing Opticians is a trade body for manufacturers of ophthalmic examination technology established in 1917. It claims to be the world's longest established optical trade body.

Its members are optical companies involved in aspects of manufacturing, importing and wholesaling of spectacles. It is one of the five representative bodies that make up the Optical Confederation.

FMO has two main income sources – membership subscriptions and surpluses from its trade show, Optrafair – and as a not-for-profits body it ploughs any surpluses back into the sector.

FMO members are companies rather than individuals, and include manufacturers, suppliers and distributors of optical and contant lenses, spectacle frames, optical consumables and accessories; service providers for the optical industry.

The FMO own and manage an annual trade fair, Optrafair.
