= Orchid Cellmark =

Orchid Cellmark Ltd is a UK based DNA and forensic testing company with a history of UK and US ownership.

Cellmark was established in 1987 by ICI having licensed the DNA Fingerprinting technology developed Alec Jeffreys at the University of Leicester and received a Queen's Award for Technological Achievement in 1990. The company was established to develop and provide specialist DNA testing services and now delivers a range of accredited DNA and forensic services for relationship testing and criminal investigation. Cellmark was the first private paternity testing company in the UK and participated in the consultation process which led to the establishment of the Department of Health's voluntary code of practice on genetic paternity testing in England, Wales and Northern Ireland. The company undertakes DNA paternity testing on behalf of the CSA and provides accredited DNA relationship testing to support immigration and Visa applications.

When ICI demerged in 1993, Cellmark became part of Zeneca and then part of AstraZeneca in 1998. Cellmark was acquired by Orchid BioSciences Inc in 2001. Based in Princeton, New Jersey Orchid BioSciences Inc subsequently changed its name to Orchid Cellmark Inc and operated DNA laboratories in Germantown, Dallas and Nashville, Tennessee. Cellmark was registered in the UK as Orchid Cellmark Ltd in 2005.

In December 2011, Laboratory Corporation of America Holdings (LabCorp) completed the acquisition of Orchid Cellmark Inc. In 2015 the company acquired Keith Borer Consultants, based in Durham, who provide forensic defence services through its wholly owned subsidiary, OCM Acquisition Corp.[7] It is now, in the United States, called Cellmark Forensics, Inc.

In 2018 the management team at Orchid Cellmark Ltd acquired the company from LabCorp.

The company is now one of the major providers of forensic services to police forces in England and Wales and has laboratories in Abingdon-on-Thames, Oxfordshire, and Chorley, Lancashire.

On the 20th of August 2024, Cellmark was acquired by Eurofins Scientific.

== See also ==
In February 2007, the company's location in Abingdon-on-Thames, Oxfordshire was targeted as part of the Miles Cooper letter bomb campaign. One person, a pregnant receptionist, was injured.
