= Andy Parker (businessman) =

British businessman and former CEO of Capita (born 1969)

- Born: Andrew George Parker; January 1969 (age 56); York, England
- Education: Warwick University
- Occupation: Businessman
- Title: Former CEO, Capita
- Term: March 2014 - September 2017
- Spouse: married
- Children: 3 sons

Andrew George Parker (born January 1969) is a British businessman, and the CEO of Capita from March 2014 to September 2017.

== Early life ==
Andrew George Parker was born in January 1969.

== Career ==
He was the CEO of Capita from March 2014, having joined the company in 2001. He resigned or was ousted in March 2017, following a 33% drop in pre-tax profits, and Capita's relegation from the FTSE-100 index, but remained in post until 15 September.
