= New Labour, New Life for Britain =

Political manifesto published in 1996 by the British Labour Party

New Labour, New Life for Britain is a political manifesto published in 1996 by the British Labour Party. The party had recently rebranded itself as New Labour under the leadership of Tony Blair. The manifesto set out the party's new "Third Way" centrist approach to policy, with subsequent success at the 1997 general election.

The 1997 general election produced the biggest Labour majority, in seat terms, in the history of the party's existence. They won majority government with 418 out of 659 seats in the House of Commons, with a majority of 179, and Blair became the prime minister of the United Kingdom. During its time in office, Labour introduced policies that achieved the main aims of the manifesto including introducing a minimum wage, increasing National Health Service (NHS) spending, and reducing class sizes in schools.

The Conservatives left government after about eighteen years, following victories in 1979, 1983, 1987, and 1992; the first three under the leadership of Margaret Thatcher and the last under John Major. In 1997, they suffered their worst defeat since 1906, losing 178 seats, including the unseating of seven Conservative Cabinet Ministers and the loss of all their representation in Wales and Scotland. With 165 seats, the Tories became the Official Opposition. This election began a Labour government following an 18-year spell in opposition and continued with another landslide victory in 2001 and a third consecutive victory in 2005, despite losing a great deal of popular support. In 2010, with Blair having retired as prime minister, in which capacity Gordon Brown succeeded him, Labour became the official opposition with 258 seats, having fallen to 29% in the popular vote.

Following the general election defeat of 2010, Brown resigned as leader of the Labour Party. His successor, Ed Miliband, completely abandoned the New Labour branding in 2010 after being elected, moving the party's political stance to the left.

== Pledge card ==
During the 1997 general election campaign, a pledge card with five specific pledges was issued and detailed in the manifesto too.

== See also ==
- List of Labour Party (UK) general election manifestos
- Our Society, Your Life
- Individual Learning Accounts
- Freedom of Information Act 2000
- Human Rights Act 1998
- National Minimum Wage Act 1998
- Regional development agencies
- Devolution for Scotland and Wales
- UK Trident programme (retaining)
- Windfall Tax (United Kingdom)
- Total ban on the use of landmines
