= Student Awards Agency for Scotland =

Executive agency

Student Awards Agency Scotland

Executive agency overview
- Jurisdiction: Scotland
- Employees: 266 (2024/25)
- Executive agency executive: Catherine Topley, Chief Executive Officer
- Parent Executive agency: Scottish Government
- Website: www.saas.gov.uk

Student Awards Agency Scotland (SAAS) (Scottish Gaelic: Buidheann-tabhartais Oileanach na h-Alba) is an executive agency of the Scottish Government. It supports eligible Scottish students by paying their tuition fees, as well as offering bursaries and supplementary grants. It also assesses students applying for loans. The Agency administers the Individual Learning Accounts Scotland scheme (ILA's) in partnership with Skills Development Scotland (SDS).

== Funding provided ==
SAAS provides funding to students. Some of the most noteworthy are:

=== Tuition fees ===
SAAS pays the tuition fees of eligible Scottish and EU students. SAAS will pay these fees regardless of a student's financial situation.

=== Fee loans ===
SAAS can authorise loans to cover the tuition fees of Scottish students going to study elsewhere in the UK.

=== Student loans ===
Student loans are available to help with living costs. Student loans are paid by the Student Loans Company but students apply for their loan through SAAS. Any eligible student can apply for the minimum loan regardless of their income. The maximum loan is income assessed. The maximum loan that a young student can receive is £5,750, and the maximum loan for an independent student is £6750. However, if your household income is over £34,000 the maximum loan for a student is £4,750.

Students normally do not have to start repaying this loan until the April after they graduate or leave their course. The Student Loans Company (SLC) expect students to pay 9% of any income they earn over £17,335 a year. This threshold normally increases every year with inflation.

=== Bursary ===
A bursary is a non-repayable income-assessed grant to help students with living costs.

A young student can receive a bursary of up to £1,750. To be eligible to receive a bursary an applicant's family have to have a household income of no more than £33,999.

An independent student can receive a bursary of £750. To be eligible to receive the bursary an applicant's spouse/partner must earn no more than £16,999.

Bursaries for higher education students from Scottish households with an income of up to £24,000 will increase by £125 from academic year 2015/16 - raising the maximum available bursary for young students to £1,875, and £875 for independent students. From 2016/17 the household income threshold for receiving the maximum bursary will also be raised from up to £17,000 to up to £19,000.

== See also ==
- Education in Scotland
