= Miles Cooper letter bomb campaign =

2007 terrorist incident in the UK

In the United Kingdom, a series of seven letter bombs were sent during January and February 2007 to various companies and agencies, all related in some way to DNA testing and road transport. Police said that some of the letters were hand written and some typed. All seven letter bombs were sent in A5 Jiffy-style envelopes. On 19 February 2007, Miles Cooper was arrested, and appeared in court on 23 February charged with 12 offences relating to the case. On 27 September, he was found guilty of all 12 charges.

== Locations and injuries ==
- On 18 January a device was sent to the Forensic Science Service in Chelmsley Wood, West Midlands. On the same day, another device was sent to Orchid Cellmark in Abingdon near Oxford, and another to a company, LGC Forensics, located at Culham Science Centre, near Abingdon. These three incidents were believed to be the work of animal rights extremists. On the back of one of those envelopes, sent to one of the firms in Abingdon, was the name of Barry Horne, an animal rights activist who died in 2001 while serving an 18-year jail sentence for a firebombing campaign in Bristol.
- On 3 February a device was sent to a private house in Folkestone, Kent. It was addressed to the "Senior Manager" of a dissolved security company that used to be run from the address. The man, Mike Wingfield, 53, suffered minor injuries to his hands, face and stomach.
- On 5 February, a device was sent to the Capita centre in Victoria, London, that deals with the congestion charge in London. One person was injured, and later admitted into hospital with minor injuries to her hands and stomach.
- On 6 February, a device was sent to the accountancy firm Vantis plc in Wokingham, Berkshire. The accountancy firm acted as the registered office of Speed Check Services Limited, a company that provided digital speed cameras to police. Two men received minor injuries, but did not need hospitalisation.
- On 7 February, a device was sent to the main Driver and Vehicle Licensing Agency centre in Swansea, south Wales. Four workers were taken to Morriston Hospital in Swansea.

== Miles Cooper ==
Miles Cooper, a 27-year-old former primary school caretaker from Cherry Hinton near Cambridge in the United Kingdom, was arrested on 19 February 2007 in conjunction with the letter bombs, as a result of the Operation Hansel investigation.

He appeared in court to answer 12 charges related to the bombings on 23 February 2007. Seven of these charges relate to the seven letter bombs, while the other five relate to the injuries caused by the successful bombs. All of the low-impact explosive devices were sent to state institutions and private companies that Cooper believed were connected to the rise in surveillance society. He pleaded not guilty to the charge of intent to cause injury or death, claiming his actions were designed to draw attention to the issue of authoritarian government. He was convicted on 27 September 2007.

On 28 September 2007, he was sentenced to an indeterminate term in prison. Sentencing him, Judge Julian Hall told Cooper "You are a terrorist, there can be no mistake", and said that he would have to serve 4 years and 149 days before he would be eligible to apply for parole. Judge Hall added "You come across as a quite unemotional young man with little empathy for others."

== Police investigation ==
The police investigation was codenamed Operation Hansel. A number of UK news media reported on 19 February that a man had been arrested in connection with a series of letter bomb attacks. On 22 February the suspect, Miles Cooper, was charged with seven offences under the Explosive Substances Act 1883 and with five offences against the person. Cooper pleaded not guilty, and on 27 September 2007 was found guilty on all 12 charges.

== See also ==
- 2007 UK terrorist incidents
- List of terrorist incidents in the United Kingdom
