= Cohabitation in the United Kingdom =

Cohabitation in the United Kingdom, according to social security law would typically relate to a couple being treated as living together as a married couple even if not married or in a civil partnership. This has the effect that for means-tested benefits their resources are treated as held in common. There are also effects on benefits which depend on the claimant not having a partner.

== History ==
The Victorian era of the late 19th century is famous for the Victorian standards of personal morality. Historians generally agree that the middle classes held high personal moral standards and rejected cohabitation. They have debated whether the working classes followed suit. Moralists in the late 19th century such as Henry Mayhew decried high levels of cohabitation without marriage and illegitimate births in London slums. However new research using computerized matching of data files shows that the rates of cohabitation were quite low—under 5% – for the working class and the urban poor.

== Statistics ==
There are 3.5 million cohabiting-couples in England and Wales as of 2025, (17.6% of all families) up 137% from 1.5 million in 1996.

In modern day Britain, nearly half of babies are born to people who are not married (in the United Kingdom 47.3% in 2011; in Scotland in 2012 the proportion was 51.3%). It is estimated that by 2016, the majority of births in the UK will be to unmarried parents.

There are differences in extramarital births by region; in 2012, the highest percentage of births to unmarried women were in North East of England at 59%, and in Wales at 58%; and the lowest in London (36%) and in Northern Ireland (42%). One of the reasons cited for the lower percentage of extramarital births in London is the high number of immigrants from conservative world regions who reside in the city. Younger mothers are more likely to be unmarried: in 2011, 96% of mothers aged under 20 were unmarried, compared to only 31% of mothers in their 30s. A study dealing with births that occurred in the year 2000 found several social and personal characteristics of cohabiting vs. married parents: married mothers are most likely to be Asian and least likely Black Caribbean; married mothers are more religious; married mothers and fathers are more educated (they are more than twice as likely to have a degree than cohabiting parents); married fathers are twice as likely to have a professional occupation as cohabiting fathers; married parents have a better financial situation; married mothers are older and are more likely to have had the birth planned. A 2006 study found that cohabiting couples, with and without children, are the fastest-growing family type in the UK. Cohabiting couples who live with their children are more common in the North of England than in the South.

== Legal status ==
In response to the increase in cohabitation, several legal changes were made in the UK in recent years. In Scotland, the Family Law (Scotland) Act 2006 provides cohabitants with some limited rights. In addition, since 2003 in England and Wales, 2002 in Northern Ireland, and 2006 in Scotland, an unmarried father has parental responsibility if he is listed on the birth certificate.

In the UK, in recent years, the falling marriage rates and increased births outside marriage have become a political issue, with questions of whether the government should promote marriage (i.e. through tax benefits or public campaigns) or whether it should focus on the status of a parent, rather than that of a spouse; with the former view being endorsed by the Conservative Party, and the latter by the Labour Party and the Liberal Democrats. There are also differences between England and Wales and Scotland, with the latter being more accepting of cohabitation.

While 49% of cohabiting couples that are not married or in a civil partnership believe they have rights under a 'common law marriage', common law marriage has no legal standing in England and Wales. Cohabiting couples are not automatic beneficiaries or have protections regarding non-joint bank accounts, mortgages, tenancies or pensions, unless the other person is explicitly mentioned as a joint account holder or in the terms as a beneficiary, for example in the event of death.

In June 2026, the Ministry of Justice (England and Wales), published a consultation on future reforms of financial rights, for unmarried families.

=== Social security law ===
Living together has been part of the law since the beginning of the modern welfare state in 1948. The term "Living together as husband and wife" was introduced from 4 April 1977 to mean the same as "cohabiting with a man as his wife" which was used before that date. The term is now "living together as a married couple".

To be regarded as "living together as a married couple" or cohabitating, there are various questions to consider. The question of cohabitation should take into consideration all the six questions, and looking at the relationship as a whole.

| Question | Consideration |
|---|---|
| Do the couple live in the same household? | Couple must live at the same address, eat together and share domestic jobs (such as washing). It is possible for two people to live in the same building and not share the same household (such as a marriage break up where two partners lead separate lives at the same address), thus they should be able to claim benefit separately. If one partner has a home elsewhere where they pay bills, they are not deemed living with the claimant. |
| Is this a stable relationship? | A casual affair is not the same as a marriage. |
| What happens to the money? | If a couple share money this may be evidence that the relationship is like a husband and wife. |
| Is there sex? | Sex is an important part of living together as a married couple, though disclosure is voluntary. Even if a couple consider their relationship like a marriage, if they do not have sex they should not be treated as living together as a married couple. |
| Are there children? | If a couple have children together then it is hard to argue that they are not living together as a married couple, unless it can be shown that the relationship has changed since they had the children. |
| What do other people think? | If people go out together in public as a couple, that is evidence that they are a couple. Not doing these things does not necessarily show they are not a couple. |

== See also ==
- Marriage in the United Kingdom
- Divorce in England and Wales
- Divorce in Scotland
- Social class in the United Kingdom
