= Eye care in the United Kingdom =

Eye care in the United Kingdom is available through the National Health Service. Eye care in the community is almost entirely provided by optometrists in private practice. Specialist NHS services are provided from a small number of eye hospitals, and their staff often run clinics in general hospitals in their region.

== Sight tests ==
Free NHS sight tests in England and Northern Ireland are available to anyone who is:

- aged under 16, or aged under 19 and in full-time education
- aged 60 or over
- registered blind or partially sighted
- diagnosed with diabetes or glaucoma
- aged 40 or over who is the parent, brother, sister, son or daughter of a person diagnosed with glaucoma, or has been advised by an ophthalmologist that they are at risk of glaucoma
- eligible for an NHS complex lens voucher
- a prisoner on leave from prison
- anyone entitled under the NHS Low Income Scheme

For those who have to pay the charge is £23.53. People who are unable to visit an optician can have a mobile sight test where an optometrist comes to visit their home or a day centre. For those who have to pay the charge is £64.33.

The patient is given the prescription which can be fulfilled by any optician. An optical voucher will be given to those who need glasses.

=== Scotland ===
In April 2006, the Scottish Government agreed to the introduction of an enhanced General Ophthalmic Services eye examination, with higher fees. Free NHS sight tests are available to any UK resident and are a thorough examination to check the health of the eyes.

Fees for optometrists are £45.00 for a primary eye examination for patients over 60, and £37 for those under 60 and £21.50 a supplementary examination. For the extra money a Scottish optometrist has to be assessed as fit to practice to the higher standard, has restrictions on the daily volume of eye exams they can perform, and has to fulfil a prescribed range of compulsory tests upon each patient having a primary eye examination. In 2007 following the introduction of the free exam, an additional 613,000 people received the free eye examination taking the total in Scotland to just under 1.6 million. A report published in May 2012. ‘The Economic Impact of Free Eye Examinations in Scotland’, carried out by 4-consulting and commissioned by the Association of Optometrists, showed the improved Scottish universal eye examination had led to an increase in the number of people having eye examinations, and an estimated 1,900 of people were likely to have had their condition remedied.

=== Wales ===
In Wales the entitlement to sight tests is similar to that in England, except that most optometrists can also offer a free eye test to people who:

- have an eye problem that needs urgent attention
- have sight in one eye only
- are registered as sight impaired
- have a hearing impairment and are profoundly deaf
- suffer from retinitis pigmentosa.
- are of Black or Asian ethnicity
- are at risk of eye disease because they are the genetic father, mother, sibling or child of someone with an eye disease that can be inherited, such as Glaucoma, Diabetes Mellitus, Age related Macular Degeneration or Retinitis Pigmentosa
- Their GP has referred them because they may have an eye problem

== Glasses ==
People qualify for help with the cost of glasses or contact lenses if they are:

- aged under 16
- aged under 19 and in full-time education
- eligible for an NHS complex lens voucher (a ophthalmic practitioner will advise a person on their entitlement)
- a prisoner on leave from prison
- qualify under the NHS Low Income Scheme

Qualifying people get an NHS optical voucher, the value of which depends on their prescription. The voucher can be cashed with any supplier who accepts NHS optical vouchers.

Between 1948 and 1985, the NHS supplied spectacle frames. In 1949, there were ten free styles of frame and seven which could be chosen for payment of an additional fee. There could be an 18-month waiting list before the finished spectacles arrived. Initially they were free, but a £1 charge was imposed in 1951. Free NHS lenses could be fitted into privately supplied frames.

== Ophthalmology services ==
In 2018, it was reported that more than 7,000 ophthalmology patients at University Hospital Southampton NHS Foundation Trust, 4,500 with glaucoma and 2,500 with diabetes-related eye problems, had not been given follow-up appointments. The trust said there had been a 5% rise in patients every year and demand had outstripped capacity in most NHS trusts. The president of the Royal College of Ophthalmologists said “More patients are being put on waiting lists that don’t tend to end up being managed appropriately, and we get a situation where there are hundreds if not thousands of patients on the lists.” As these patients were generally elderly, he felt they were not treated as a priority. The college calculated that 230 new ophthalmology consultants were needed to deal with the rising demand.

The college conducted a workforce census in 2019 which found a “serious shortage of ophthalmologists” and a “widespread use of locums which… can create significant risks to patients”. In 2018, 42 consultant posts were completely vacant and 127 were filled by locums.

== Artificial eyes ==
Prosthetic eyes are supplied by the National Artificial Eye Service centres based in hospitals.

== Providers ==
According to Which? consumers rate local independent opticians as offering a better experience for buying glasses or contact lenses than high street chains.

== Fees ==
The fee for the optometrist in England, Wales and Northern Ireland paid by the NHS is £21.31. Fees are negotiated by the Optometric Fees Negotiating Committee. Its members include the Association of British Dispensing Opticians, the Association of Optometrists, the British Medical Association and the Federation of Opticians.

The Federation of (Ophthalmic and Dispensing) Opticians is the trade body.
