= Profit warning =

Warning declaration issued by a listed company to investors through a stock exchange

A profit warning is a warning declaration issued by a listed company to investors through a stock exchange. It warns investors that the profit of the company in the coming quarter will significantly decline when compared with that of the same quarter of previous year, or the company may even make a loss. Investors should be aware of the possible loss when buying or selling its stock. For example, William Hill Bookmakers issued a profit warning on 23 March 2016 which they attributed to "a bad run of results and customers imposing betting limits on themselves". Company share prices often fall following a profit warning being issued.

Sometimes, "profit warning" is considered to be a neutral term and it refers to "estimated results improvement". Some companies may issue a "profit warning" to inform investors that their expected profit will obviously increase in the coming quarter. The expression has been criticized for being misleading and obscure, because it means profits are lower than expected or previously announced rather than a loss. It was a finalist for taboo word of the year in Germany in 2001, and in Austria in 2008.
