= Our Society, Your Life =

2007 Conservative policy statement

Our Society, Your Life is a 2007 policy statement for the Conservative Party, launched shortly after David Cameron became leader of the party – then in Opposition – in 2005, following a leadership election in that year.

It has been seen by some, such as Richard Kelly (head of politics at Manchester Grammar School) as a triangulation of Conservative ideology with that of New Labour, and linking into the idea of the Third Way. Kelly says New Labour "sought to reconcile ... the embedded ideals of Labour with the effects of Thatcherism". Kelly also says that Our Society, Your Life "echoed [Tony] Blair's rejection of the Thatcherite view that there is 'no such thing' as society":

... the big idea on which we'll build our plan for government ... is social responsibility. The idea that there is such a thing as society, it's just not the same thing as the state. Social responsibility means that every time we see a problem, we don't just ask what government can do. We ask what people can do, what society can do.

Instead Cameron supported what Kelly describes as the Burkean "little platoons": the network of families, churches and voluntary organisations which supposedly bind a society together.

== See also ==
- New Labour, New Life for Britain
- Big Society
