= Individual Learning Account =

Tax incentives for adult education in the UK

The Individual Learning Accounts (ILA) scheme was a British Government scheme designed to support adult education in the United Kingdom from the late 1990s. The scheme was announced in the 1997 Labour Party manifesto to support adult education in Britain with a system of tax incentives from employers, as well as a cash contribution of £150 to each of a million individuals. The system was biased towards the uptake of information technology skills, following the emergence of the Internet. The scheme was abandoned in October 2001, after widespread fraud and abuse was found.

ILA Scotland was a separate scheme launched in 2004 by the Scottish Executive, which was replaced in 2017. The Welsh Assembly Government also ran an ILA scheme from 2004 until 2017.

== Original scheme ==
The scheme was announced in the 1997 Labour Party manifesto, and formally introduced by the Chancellor of the Exchequer, Gordon Brown in the 1999 budget. It was launched in 2000 in the form of financial reimbursement to educational course providers for the cost of the ILA incentives, intended to support adult education in Britain with a system of tax incentives from employers, as well as a cash contribution of £150 to each of a million individuals. The system was biased towards the uptake of information technology skills, following the emergence of the Internet.

By the time the scheme was abandoned in October 2001, there were 8,500 accredited providers nationwide. The Department for Education and Skills was investigating 279 providers on the basis of substantial evidence of misselling, and police had arrested 30 people. Prosecutions based on this fraud were still taking place in 2008.

Capita was the contractor that implemented the payment scheme. Following its investigation, the Parliamentary Committee of Public Accounts reported that the total expenditure on the scheme exceeded £290million (£37million paid towards Capita) with fraud and abuse amounting to £97 million. The fraudulent activity was in the form of obtaining learning account numbers from individuals or of buying them from corrupt providers and simply cashing the credit, knowing that there was virtually no chance that the fact that no education had been delivered would be detected. At the same time, the "students" were made to think they were getting a computer for free. This was generally a 4–5 year-old machine, in which a "study pack" had been installed in order to amount to education providing.

== ILA Scotland ==
In 2004, the Scottish Executive launched ILA Scotland, to replace the original ILAs. This new scheme was managed by Learndirect Scotland and the Student Awards Agency for Scotland. The Scheme provided up to £200 per year for a variety of courses. ILAs were available for people with an income of £22,000 a year or less, who were not in full-time education or who are receiving benefits. In 2017, after consultations, the Scottish Government replaced ILAs with Individual Training Accounts, which are fully provided by Skills Development Scotland.

== ILA Wales ==
The Welsh Assembly Government launched a replacement ILA scheme in 2003. The ILA Wales scheme was closed by 31 March 2011.
