= National Assistance =

Welfare benefit in the United Kingdom

National Assistance was the main means-tested benefit in the United Kingdom from 1948 to 1966.

It was established by the National Assistance Act 1948 (11 & 12 Geo. 6. c. 29) and abolished by the Ministry of Social Security Act 1966, which established the Supplementary Benefit in its place.

It replaced earlier provisions under the Poor Law. The Beveridge Report of 1942 proposed a system of contributory benefits which would leave only a residual role for means-tested benefits.

"Assistance will be available to meet all needs which are not covered by insurance. It must meet those needs adequately up to subsistence level, but it must be felt to be something less desirable than insurance benefit; otherwise the insured persons get nothing for their contributions."

The National Assistance Board was established to direct the scheme, taking over from the Unemployment Assistance Board. There were close similarities between the National Assistance regulations of 1948 and the pre-war Unemployment Assistance regulations, and many of the same officials were involved. A key difference was that the Means Test no longer extended to the earnings of sons and daughters.

During the 1950s, inflation meant that national insurance benefits fell below the official poverty line, and increasing numbers turned to national assistance.
