= C2k =

Northern Ireland education network

- Parent organization: Education Authority
- Website: http://www.c2kni.org.uk/
- Formerly called: Classroom 2000

C2K (formerly known as Classroom 2000) is a Northern Ireland-wide information and communications network operated on behalf of the Education Authority. After the separation of the education and library boards, the C2k project has been overseen by the Education Authority Northern Ireland. Since its creation, the project has been funded by the European Union through its Building Sustainable Prosperity programme and the Department of Education. The C2k contract is currently fulfilled by Capita Technology and Software Solutions.

C2k is responsible for providing all schools in Northern Ireland with internet and other services to support the Northern Irish Curriculum.

Some schools use their own systems, called School or Legacy.

Over the next few years, it will be replaced with EdIS (Education Information Solutions).

== 2026 Network Intrusion Incident ==
In early April 2026, C2k was targeted in a cyberattack, leaving students using the network unable to log into their accounts.

On 2 April 2026, the Police Service of Northern Ireland (PSNI) received a report regarding a network intrusion involving the Education Authority.

On 10 April 2026, forensic experts investigating the incident informed the Education Authority that there had been specific and targeted access to confidential personal information.

On 15 April 2026, the PSNI arrested a 16-year-old boy on suspicion of offences under sections 1, 2, and 3A of the Computer Misuse Act 1990. He was later released on bail pending further enquiries. On the same day, the Education Authority published an update stating that it believed personal data had been compromised.

On 25 June 2026, the Education Authority issued a new warning to parents, revealing that the number of schools affected was larger than previously thought. Letters were sent to 23 schools, 16 of which had not received prior notifications.

On 25 September 2026, the Department of Education had confirmed that the Education Authority's investigation had concluded and they were now liaising with the PSNI and the Information Commissioner’s Office (ICO). They had also stated that back in June, the ICO's Technical Investigation Team met with the Education Authority's Information Governance Team; the meeting was described as positive, and the EA continued to provide information as requested. The response further stated that the Education Authority's managed service provider had shared a draft lessons learned report on 18 September 2026. The draft highlighted areas for improvement and reflected on positive practices.
