= Local optical committee =

Local Optical Committees are statutory bodies established within the British National Health Service to represent the interests of community optometrists and opticians. There are 78 Local Optical Committees in England. They are supported by the Local Optical Committee Support Unit which provides a link to the national bodies the Association of British Dispensing Opticians, the Association of Optometrists and the Federation of (Ophthalmic and Dispensing) Opticians.

The local committees are descended from the Ophthalmic Services Committees established by clause 41 of the National Health Service Act 1946. A Joint Council of Qualified Opticians was established as part of the National Health Insurance Scheme in 1923. The Ophthalmic Benefit Approved Committee was established in 1927.

Optical committee leaders hold an annual National Optical Conference.
