= Optical Confederation =

British trade association

The Optical Confederation is a British trade association launched in April 2010. It is said to help the optometric profession to "punch well above its weight". Lobbying is one of its key activities. It agrees on advice to opticians with the Department of Health about the administration of NHS sight tests and what fees practitioners can claim. It also issues guidance on professional issues which apply to the entire optical sector, such as the prevention of abuse of vulnerable patients.

The members are:

- Association of British Dispensing Opticians
- Association of Contact Lens Manufacturers
- Association of Optometrists
- Federation of Manufacturing Opticians
- Federation of Ophthalmic and Dispensing Opticians

Chris Hunt is chairman of the Confederation.

== Achievements ==
The Confederation negotiated a solution to the difficulties posed by the use of fluorescein impregnated paper strips when Bausch & Lomb discontinued the production of Fluorets. These strips which are applied to the eye are borderline products and have been regulated as medicines in the UK, whereas they are regulated as medical devices in most of the rest of the EU.

At the end of 2014 the Confederation negotiated agreement that practitioners in England could use the NHS logo on their practice fronts.

It played an important role in arranging the funding for the Foresight Project which is intended to address the challenges of technological change to the profession.
