= Federation of (Ophthalmic and Dispensing) Opticians =

The Federation of (Ophthalmic and Dispensing) Opticians is a trade organisation representing eye care providers and registered opticians in business in the UK and Republic of Ireland. It was founded in 1985 and is generally referred to as FODO. It is a registered charity.

In the UK, they are founder members of the Optical Confederation and supporters of Vision 2020 UK and the UK Vision Strategy.
