= List of statutory rules of Northern Ireland, 2022 =

This is a list of statutory rules made in the Northern Ireland in the year 2022.

== 1-100 ==
| Number | Title |
|---|---|
| 1 | The Direct Payments to Farmers (Simplifications) Regulations (Northern Ireland) 2022 |
| 2 | The Insolvency Practitioners (Recognised Professional Bodies) (Revocation of Recognition) (Revocation) Order (Northern Ireland) 2022 |
| 3 | The Health Protection (Coronavirus, International Travel, Operator Liability and Information to Passengers) (Amendment) Regulations (Northern Ireland) 2022 |
| 4 | The Corporate Insolvency and Governance Act 2020 (Coronavirus) (Early Termination of Part 2 of Schedule 8) Regulations (Northern Ireland) 2022 |
| 5 | The Financial Assistance (Coronavirus: Hospitality) Regulations (Northern Ireland) 2022 |
| 6 | The Health Protection (Coronavirus, Restrictions) Regulations (Northern Ireland) 2021 (Amendment) Regulations (Northern Ireland) 2022 |
| 7 | The Parking Places on Roads and Waiting Restrictions (Magherafelt) (Amendment) Order (Northern Ireland) 2022 |
| 8 | The Crankill Road Central Reservation, Ballymena (Stopping-Up) Order (Northern Ireland) 2022 |
| 9 | The Mines (Amendment) Regulations (Northern Ireland) 2022 |
| 10 (C. 1) | The Health (Miscellaneous Provisions) (2016 Act) (Commencement No.3) Order (Northern Ireland) 2022 |
| 11 | The Health Protection (Coronavirus, Wearing of Face Coverings) (Amendment) Regulations (Northern Ireland) 2022 |
| 12 | The Health Protection (Coronavirus, Restrictions) Regulations (Northern Ireland) 2021 (Amendment No.2) Regulations (Northern Ireland) 2022 |
| 13 | The Rates (Amendment) Regulations (Northern Ireland) 2022 |
| 14 | The Universal Credit and Employment and Support Allowance (Claimant Commitment Exceptions) (Amendment) Regulations (Northern Ireland) 2022 |
| 15 | The Housing Benefit and Universal Credit Housing Costs (Executive Determinations) (Amendment and Modification) Regulations (Northern Ireland) 2022 |
| 16 | The Health Protection (Coronavirus, Restrictions) Regulations (Northern Ireland) 2021 (Amendment No.3) Regulations (Northern Ireland) 2022 |
| 17 | The Rates (Making and Levying of Different Rates) Regulations (Northern Ireland) 2022 |
| 18 | The Health Protection (Coronavirus, Wearing of Face Coverings) (Amendment No.2) Regulations (Northern Ireland) 2022 |
| 19 | The Parking Places (Disabled Persons’ Vehicles) (Amendment) Order (Northern Ireland) 2022 |
| [20] | The Parking and Waiting Restrictions (Londonderry) (Amendment) Order (Northern Ireland) 2022 |
| 21 | The Ardmillan Gardens, Bangor (Abandonment) Order (Northern Ireland) 2022 |
| 22 | The Footway to the rear of Quadrant Place, near Albert Street, Belfast (Abandonment) Order (Northern Ireland) 2022 |
| 23 | The Grants to Water and Sewerage Undertakers Order (Northern Ireland) 2022 |
| 24 | The Coronavirus Act 2020 (Extension of Provisions Related to Courts, Tribunals and Inquests) Order (Northern Ireland) 2022 |
| 25 | The Welfare Supplementary Payment (Extension) Regulations (Northern Ireland) 2022 |
| 26 | The Charities Act 2008 (Presbyterian Widows’ Fund Association Scheme) Order (Northern Ireland) 2022 |
| 27 | The Housing-Related Functions of the Department of Finance (Exercise by the Housing Executive) Regulations (Northern Ireland) 2022 |
| 28 | The Energy Payment Support Scheme Regulations (Northern Ireland) 2022 |
| 29 | The Financial Assistance (Coronavirus: Hospitality) (Amendment) Regulations (Northern Ireland) 2022 |
| 30 (C. 2) | The Damages (Return on Investment) Act (Northern Ireland) 2022 (Commencement) Order (Northern Ireland) 2022 |
| 31 | The Pharmaceutical Services (Amendment) Regulations (Northern Ireland) 2022 |
| 32 | The Welfare Supplementary Payment (Amendment) Regulations (Northern Ireland) 2022 |
| 33 | The Single Use Carrier Bags Charge (Amendment and Revocation) Regulations (Northern Ireland) 2022 |
| 34 | The Insolvency Practitioners (Recognised Professional Bodies) (Revocation of Recognition) Order (Northern Ireland) 2022 |
| 35 | The Adam Street, Belfast (Abandonment) Order (Northern Ireland) 2022 |
| 36 | The Parking Places (Disabled Persons’ Vehicles) (Amendment No. 2) Order (Northern Ireland) 2022 |
| 37 | The Parking and Waiting Restrictions (Newtownabbey) (Amendment) Order (Northern Ireland) 2022 |
| 38 | The Glebe Park, Moira (Abandonment) Order (Northern Ireland) 2022 |
| 39 | The Roads (Speed Limit) Order (Northern Ireland) 2022 |
| 40 | The Mullinure Lane, Armagh (Abandonment and Stopping-Up) Order (Northern Ireland) 2022 |
| 41 | The Century Street, Belfast (Footway) (Abandonment) Order (Northern Ireland) 2022 |
| 42 | The Parking and Waiting Restrictions (Carrickfergus) (Amendment) Order (Northern Ireland) 2022 |
| 43 | The Health Protection (Coronavirus, International Travel, Operator Liability and Information to Passengers) (Amendment No. 2) Regulations (Northern Ireland) 2022 (revoked) |
| 44 | The Bus Operator (Coronavirus, Financial Assistance) Regulations (Northern Ireland) 2022 |
| 45 | The Education (Curriculum Minimum Content) (Amendment) Order (Northern Ireland) 2022 |
| 46 | The Health Protection (Coronavirus, International Travel, Operator Liability and Information to Passengers) (Amendment No. 3) Regulations (Northern Ireland) 2022 (revoked) |
| 47 | The Health Protection (Coronavirus, Restrictions, Wearing of Face Coverings) (Revocation) Regulations (Northern Ireland) 2022 |
| 48 | The Marriage, Civil Partnership and Civil Registration (Amendment) Regulations (Northern Ireland) 2022 |
| 49 | Not Allocated |
| 50 | The Rates (Regional Rates) Order (Northern Ireland) 2022 |
| 51 | The Rates (Small Business Hereditament Relief) (Amendment) Regulations (Northern Ireland) 2022 |
| 52 (C. 3) | The Domestic Abuse Act 2021 (Commencement No. 1) Order (Northern Ireland) 2022 |
| 53 | Not Allocated |
| 54 (C. 5) | The Environment (2021 Act) (Commencement and Saving Provision) Order (Northern Ireland) 2022 |
| 55 & 56 | Not Allocated |
| 57 (C. 7) | The Domestic Abuse and Civil Proceedings Act (Northern Ireland) 2021 (Commencement No. 1) Order (Northern Ireland) 2022 |
| 58 | The Clearway (Moneymore Road, Cookstown) Order (Northern Ireland) 2022 |
| 59 (C. 8) | The Domestic Abuse and Civil Proceedings Act (Northern Ireland) 2021 (Commencement No. 2) Order (Northern Ireland) 2022 |
| 60 | The Narrow Water Bridge Order (Northern Ireland) 2022 |
| 61 | The Newry River (Diversion of Navigable Watercourse and Extinguishment of Public Rights of Navigation) Order (Northern Ireland) 2022 |
| 62 | The Social Security Benefits (Amendment) Regulations (Northern Ireland) 2022 |
| 63 (C. 9) | The Licensing and Registration of Clubs (Amendment) (2021 Act) (Commencement No. 2) Order (Northern Ireland) 2022 |
| 64 | The Foreglen Road, Dungiven (Abandonment) Order (Northern Ireland) 2022 |
| 65 | The Parole Commissioners’ (Amendment) Rules (Northern Ireland) 2022 |
| 66 | The Vennel, Bangor (Abandonment) Order (Northern Ireland) 2022 |
| 67 | The Public Service (Civil Servants and Others) Pensions (Amendment) Regulations (Northern Ireland) 2022 |
| 68 | The Marine Licensing (Exempted Activities) (Amendment) Order (Northern Ireland) 2022 |
| 69 | The Pension Protection Fund and Occupational Pension Schemes (Levy Ceiling) Order (Northern Ireland) 2022 |
| 70 | The Building (Prescribed Fees) (Amendment) Regulations (Northern Ireland) 2022 |
| 71 | The Building (Amendment) Regulations (Northern Ireland) 2022 |
| 72 | The Public Interest Disclosure (Prescribed Persons) (Amendment) Order (Northern Ireland) 2022 |
| 73 | The Judicial Pensions (Amendment) Regulations (Northern Ireland) 2022 |
| 74 | The Proceeds of Crime Act 2002 (Application of Police and Criminal Evidence (Northern Ireland) Order 1989) (Amendment) Order (Northern Ireland) 2022 |
| 75 | The Education (Student Support, etc.) (Amendment) Regulations (Northern Ireland) 2022 |
| 76 | The Rates (Exemption for Automatic Telling Machines in Rural Areas) Order (Northern Ireland) 2022 |
| 77 | The Rates (Temporary Rebate) (Amendment) Order (Northern Ireland) 2022 |
| 78 | The Licensing (Sample) Regulations (Northern Ireland) 2022 |
| 79 | The Licensing (Notice Relating to Restaurants and Guest Houses) Regulations (Northern Ireland) 2022 |
| 80 | The Rates (Coronavirus) (Emergency Relief) Regulations (Northern Ireland) 2022 |
| 81 | The Rates (Coronavirus) (Emergency Relief) (No. 2) Regulations (Northern Ireland) 2022 |
| 82 | The Public Service Pensions Revaluation Order (Northern Ireland) 2022 |
| 83 | The Occupational Pension Schemes (Charges and Governance) (Amendment) Regulations (Northern Ireland) 2022 |
| 84 | The Social Security (Industrial Injuries) (Prescribed Diseases) (Amendment) Regulations (Northern Ireland) 2022 |
| 85 | The Licensing (Notice Relating to Local Producer’s Licence) Regulations (Northern Ireland) 2022 |
| 86 | The Social Security Revaluation of Earnings Factors Order (Northern Ireland) 2022 |
| 87 | The Occupational Pension Schemes (Schemes that were Contracted-out) (Amendment) Regulations (Northern Ireland) 2022 |
| 88 | The Energy Payment Support Scheme (Amendment) Regulations (Northern Ireland) 2022 |
| 89 (C. 10) | The Licensing and Registration of Clubs (Amendment) (2011 Act) (Commencement No. 6) Order (Northern Ireland) 2022 |
| 90 | The Rate Relief (Lone Pensioner Allowance) (Amendment) Regulations (Northern Ireland) 2022 |
| 91 | The Energy Performance of Buildings (Certificates and Inspections) (Amendment) Regulations (Northern Ireland) 2022 |
| 92 | The Rate Relief (Qualifying Age) (Amendment) Regulations (Northern Ireland) 2022 |
| 93 | The Private Accesses on the A6 Castledawson By-Pass (Stopping-Up) Order (Northern Ireland) 2022 |
| 94 | The Road Races (Craigantlet Hill Climb) Order (Northern Ireland) 2022 |
| 95 | The Road Races (Tandragee 100) Order (Northern Ireland) 2022 |
| 96 | The Parking Places on Roads (Castle Place, Belfast) Order (Northern Ireland) 2022 |
| 97 | The Derrynaseer Road (Rubble Road), Omagh (Abandonment) Order (Northern Ireland) 2022 |
| 98 | The Occupational Pension Schemes (Fraud Compensation Levy) (Amendment) Regulations (Northern Ireland) 2022 |
| 99 | The Registration of Clubs (Accounts) Regulations (Northern Ireland) 2022 |
| 100 | The Recovery of Health Services Charges (Amounts) (Amendment) Regulations (Northern Ireland) 2022 |

== 101-200 ==
| Number | Title |
|---|---|
| 101 | The Employer’s Liability (Compulsory Insurance) (Amendment) Regulations (Northern Ireland) 2022 |
| 102 (C. 11) | The Health and Social Care (2022 Act) (Commencement) Order (Northern Ireland) 2022 |
| 103 | The Health and Social Care Trusts (Establishment) (Amendment) Order (Northern Ireland) 2022 |
| 104 | The Health and Social Care Act (Northern Ireland) 2022 (General Dental and Ophthalmic Services Consequential and Miscellaneous Amendment) Regulations (Northern Ireland) 2022 |
| 105 | The Superannuation (Victims of Crime Commissioner Designate) Order (Northern Ireland) 2022 |
| 106 | The Regulation and Improvement Authority (Fees and Frequency of Inspections) (Amendment) Regulations (Northern Ireland) 2022 |
| 107 (C. 12) | The Financial Guidance and Claims Act 2018 (Commencement No. 1) Order (Northern Ireland) 2022 |
| 108 | The Coronavirus Act 2020 (Extension of Provisions Relating to Local Authority Meetings) Order (Northern Ireland) 2022 |
| 109 | The Health and Social Care (Family Practitioner Services Independent Appeal Panel) Regulations (Northern Ireland) 2022 |
| 110 (C. 13) | The Pension Schemes (2021 Act) (Commencement No. 2) Order (Northern Ireland) 2022 |
| 111 | The Guaranteed Minimum Pensions Increase Order (Northern Ireland) 2022 |
| 112 | The Schools (Part-Time 20mph Speed Limit) (Amendment) Order (Northern Ireland) 2022 |
| 113 | The A6 Castledawson By-Pass (Abandonment and Stopping-Up) Order (Northern Ireland) 2022 |
| 114 | The Road Races (Croft Hill Climb) Order (Northern Ireland) 2022 |
| 115 | The Occupational and Personal Pension Schemes (Disclosure of Information) (Requirements to Refer Members to Guidance etc.) (Amendment) Regulations (Northern Ireland) 2022 |
| 116 | The Pharmaceutical Services (Amendment No. 2) Regulations (Northern Ireland) 2022 |
| 117 | The B3 Main Street, Markethill (Abandonment) Order (Northern Ireland) 2022 |
| 118 | The Road Races (Cookstown 100 Motor Cycle Road Race) Order (Northern Ireland) 2022 |
| 119 | The Road Races (Circuit of Ireland Rally) Order (Northern Ireland) 2022 |
| 120 | The Social Security (Medical Evidence) and Statutory Sick Pay (Medical Evidence) (Amendment) Regulations (Northern Ireland) 2022 |
| 121 | The Occupational Pension Schemes (Master Trusts) Regulations (Northern Ireland) 2022 |
| 122 | The Health Protection (Coronavirus, International Travel, Operator Liability and Information to Passengers) (Revocation) Regulations (Northern Ireland) 2022 |
| 123 | The Magistrates’ Courts (Licensing) (Amendment) Rules (Northern Ireland) 2022 |
| 124 | The Valuation for Rating (Decapitalisation Rate) Regulations (Northern Ireland) 2022 |
| 125 | The Rates (Social Sector Value) (Amendment) Regulations (Northern Ireland) 2022 |
| 126 | The Public Service (Civil Servants and Others) Pensions (Amendment) (No. 2) Regulations (Northern Ireland) 2022 |
| 127 | The Waste (Fees and Charges) (Amendment) Regulations (Northern Ireland) 2022 |
| 128 | The Allocation of Housing and Homelessness (Eligibility) (Amendment) Regulations (Northern Ireland) 2022 |
| 129 | The Police Service of Northern Ireland (Amendment) Regulations 2022 |
| 130 | The Coronavirus Act 2020 (Extension of Modifications of Requirements Regarding Medical Certificates for Cremations) Order (Northern Ireland) 2022 |
| 131 | Not Allocated |
| 132 (C. 14) | The Welfare Reform (Northern Ireland) Order 2015 (Commencement No. 16 and Commencement No. 8, 13 and 14 and Transitional and Transitory Provisions (Amendment)) Order (Northern Ireland) 2022 |
| 133 (C. 15) | The Licensing and Registration of Clubs (Amendment) (2021 Act) (Commencement No. 3) Order (Northern Ireland) 2022 |
| 134 | The Teachers’ Pension Scheme (Amendment) Regulations (Northern Ireland) 2022 |
| 135 | The Employment Rights (Increase of Limits) Order (Northern Ireland) 2022 |
| 136 (C. 16) | The Parental Bereavement (Leave and Pay) Act (Northern Ireland) 2022 (Commencement No.1) Order (Northern Ireland) 2022 |
| 137 | The Mesothelioma Lump Sum Payments (Conditions and Amounts) (Amendment) Regulations (Northern Ireland) 2022 |
| 138 | The Road Races (Tyrone Stages Rally) Order (Northern Ireland) 2022 |
| 139 | The Road Races (Cairncastle Hill Climb) Order (Northern Ireland) 2022 |
| 140 | The Road Races (Drumhorc Hill Climb) Order (Northern Ireland) 2022 |
| 141 | The Road Races (Maiden City Stages Rally) Order (Northern Ireland) 2022 |
| 142 | The Licensing and Registration of Clubs (Amendment) Act (Northern Ireland) 2021 (Consequential Provision) Regulations 2022 |
| 143 | The Social Security Benefits Up-rating Order (Northern Ireland) 2022 |
| 144 | The Social Security Benefits Up-rating Regulations (Northern Ireland) 2022 |
| 145 | The Police Act 1997 (Criminal Record Certificates: Relevant Matters) (Amendment) Order (Northern Ireland) 2022 |
| 146 | The Domestic Abuse Information-sharing with Schools etc. Regulations (Northern Ireland) 2022 |
| 147 (C. 17) | The Agriculture (2020 Act)(Commencement No. 1) Regulations (Northern Ireland) 2022 |
| 148 | The Police Pensions (Amendment) Regulations (Northern Ireland) 2022 |
| 149 | The Social Security (Habitual Residence and Past Presence) (Amendment) Regulations (Northern Ireland) 2022 |
| 150 | The Road Races (North West 200) Order (Northern Ireland) 2022 |
| 151 | The Coronavirus Act 2020 (Extension of Provisions Relating to Statutory Sick Pay) Order (Northern Ireland) 2022 |
| 152 | The Road Races (Spamount Hill Climb) Order (Northern Ireland) 2022 |
| 153 | The Health and Social Care Pensions (Abatement) Regulations (Northern Ireland) 2022 |
| 154 | The Licensing (Notice Relating to Local Producer’s Premises – Authorisation for On-Sales) Regulations (Northern Ireland) 2022 |
| 155 | The Firefighters’ Pension Schemes (Amendment) Regulations (Northern Ireland) 2022 |
| 156 | The Health and Social Care Pension Schemes (Amendment) Regulations (Northern Ireland) 2022 |
| 157 | The Coronavirus Act 2020 (Extension of Powers to Act for the Protection of Public Health) Order (Northern Ireland) 2022 |
| 158 | The County Courts (Financial Limits) Order (Northern Ireland) 2022 |
| 159 | The Pensions Increase (Review) Order (Northern Ireland) 2022 |
| 160 | The Coronavirus Act 2020 (Registration of deaths and still-births) (Extension) Order (Northern Ireland) 2022 |
| 161 | The Children’s Social Care (Consequential Amendments) Regulations (Northern Ireland) 2022 |
| 162 | The Health and Personal Social Services (General Medical Services Contracts) (Amendment) Regulations (Northern Ireland) 2022 |
| 163 | The Local Government Pension Scheme (Amendment) Regulations (Northern Ireland) 2022 |
| 164 | The Medical Profession (Responsible Officers) (Amendment) Regulations (Northern Ireland) 2022 |
| 165 | The Social Fund (Child Funeral Fund) Regulations (Northern Ireland) 2022 |
| 166 | The Parental Bereavement Leave Regulations (Northern Ireland) 2022 |
| 167 | The Statutory Parental Bereavement Pay (General) Regulations (Northern Ireland) 2022 |
| 168 | The Parental Bereavement Leave and Pay (Consequential Amendments to Subordinate Legislation) Regulations (Northern Ireland) 2022 |
| 169 | The Statutory Parental Bereavement Pay (Administration) Regulations (Northern Ireland) 2022 |
| 170 | The Statutory Parental Bereavement Pay (Persons Abroad and Mariners) Regulations (Northern Ireland) 2022 |
| 171 (C. 18) | The Social Security (Terminal Illness) (2022 Act) (Commencement) Order (Northern Ireland) 2022 |
| 172 | The Income-Related Benefits (Local Welfare Provision Disregard) (Amendment) Regulations (Northern Ireland) 2022 |
| 173 (C. 19) | The Pension Schemes Act 2021 (Commencement No. 4) Order (Northern Ireland) 2022 |
| 174 | The Provision of Health Services to Persons Not Ordinarily Resident (Amendment) Regulations (Northern Ireland) 2022 |
| 175 (C. 20) | The Financial Guidance and Claims Act 2018 (Commencement No. 2) Order (Northern Ireland) 2022 |
| 176 | The Misuse of Drugs (Amendment) (Revocation) Regulations (Northern Ireland) 2022 |
| 177 | The Child Support (Amendments Relating to Information) Regulations (Northern Ireland) 2022 |
| 178 | The Child Support (Amendments Relating to Electronic Communications) Order (Northern Ireland) 2022 |
| 179 | The Social Fund (Child Funeral Fund) (No. 2) Regulations (Northern Ireland) 2022 |
| 180 (C. 21) | The Licensing and Registration of Clubs (Amendment) (2021 Act) (Commencement No. 4) Order (Northern Ireland) 2022 |
| 181 | The Public Health (Notifiable Diseases) Order (Northern Ireland) 2022 |
| 182 | The Social Security (Medical Evidence) and Statutory Sick Pay (Medical Evidence) (Amendment) (No. 2) Regulations (Northern Ireland) 2022 |
| 183 | The Further Education (Student Support) (Eligibility) (Amendment etc.) Regulations (Northern Ireland) 2022 |
| 184 | The Industrial Training Levy (Construction Industry) Order (Northern Ireland) 2022 |
| 185 | The Road Races (Armoy Motorcycle Road Race) Order (Northern Ireland) 2022 |
| 186 | The Road Races (Garron Point Hill Climb) Order (Northern Ireland) 2022 |
| 187 | The Road Races (Eagles Rock Hill Climb) Order (Northern Ireland) 2022 |
| 188 | The Road Races (Mid-Antrim 150) Order (Northern Ireland) 2022 |
| 189 | The Road Races (Knockagh Hill Climb) Order (Northern Ireland) 2022 |
| 190 | The Road Races (Down Rally) Order (Northern Ireland) 2022 |
| 191 | The Occupational Pension Schemes (Collective Money Purchase Schemes) Regulations (Northern Ireland) 2022 |
| 192 | The Occupational Pension Schemes (Collective Money Purchase Schemes) (Modifications and Consequential and Miscellaneous Amendments) Regulations (Northern Ireland) 2022 |
| 193 | The Direct Payments to Farmers (Amendment) Regulations (Northern Ireland) 2022 |
| 194 | The Universal Credit (Transitional Provisions) (Amendment) Regulations (Northern Ireland) 2022 |
| 195 | The Provision of Health Services to Persons Not Ordinarily Resident (Amendment No. 2) Regulations (Northern Ireland) 2022 |
| 196 | The Health and Social Care Pension Schemes, Additional Voluntary Contributions and Injury Benefits (Amendment) Regulations (Northern Ireland) 2022 |
| 197 (C. 22) | The Pension Schemes Act 2021 (Commencement No. 5 and Transitional Provision) Order (Northern Ireland) 2022 |
| 198 | The Road Races (Ulster Rally) Order (Northern Ireland) 2022 |
| 199 | The Agriculture (Student fees) Regulations (Northern Ireland) 2022 |
| 200 | The Equine Identification (Amendment) Regulations (Northern Ireland) 2022 |

== 201-302 ==
| Number | Title |
|---|---|
| 201 | The Education (Student Support, etc.) (Amendment) (No.2) Regulations (Northern Ireland) 2022 |
| 202 | The Social Security (Amendment) Regulations (Northern Ireland) 2022 |
| 203 | Not Allocated |
| 204 | The Public Service Pensions (Employer Cost Cap and Specified Restricted Scheme) Regulations (Northern Ireland) 2022 |
| 205 | The Coronavirus Act 2020 (Extension of Provisions Relating to Statutory Sick Pay) (No. 2) Order (Northern Ireland) 2022 |
| 206 | The Roads (Speed Limit) (No. 2) Order (Northern Ireland) 2022 |
| 207 | The Parking and Waiting Restrictions (Crumlin) (Amendment) Order (Northern Ireland) 2022 |
| 208 | The Occupational and Personal Pension Schemes (Disclosure of Information) (Statements of Benefits: Money Purchase Benefits) (Amendment) Regulations (Northern Ireland) 2022 |
| 209 | The Occupational Pension Schemes (Climate Change Governance and Reporting) (Amendment, Modification and Transitional Provision) Regulations (Northern Ireland) 2022 |
| 210 | The Occupational Pension Schemes (Investment) (Employer-related Investments by Master Trusts) (Amendment) Regulations (Northern Ireland) 2022 |
| 211 | The Housing Benefit and Universal Credit (Victims of Domestic Abuse and Victims of Modern Slavery) (Amendment) Regulations (Northern Ireland) 2022 |
| 212 | The Police Act 1997 (Criminal Records) (Amendment) Regulations (Northern Ireland) 2022 |
| 213 | The Rehabilitation of Offenders (Exceptions) (Amendment) Order (Northern Ireland) 2022 |
| 214 | The Coronavirus Act 2020 (Extension of Modifications of Requirements Regarding Medical Certificates for Cremations) (No. 2) Order (Northern Ireland) 2022 |
| 215 | The Social Fund Winter Fuel Payment (Temporary Increase) Regulations (Northern Ireland) 2022 |
| 216 | The Occupational Pension Schemes (Governance and Registration) (Amendment) Regulations (Northern Ireland) 2022 |
| 217 | The Police Service of Northern Ireland (Amendment) (No. 2) Regulations 2022 |
| 218 | The Magistrates’ Courts (Amendment) Rules (Northern Ireland) 2022 |
| 219 | Not Allocated |
| 220 | The Whole of Government Accounts (Designation of Bodies) Order (Northern Ireland) 2022 |
| 221 (C. 23) | The Criminal Justice (Committal Reform) Act (Northern Ireland) 2022 (Commencement No. 1) Order (Northern Ireland) 2022 |
| 222 | The Social Fund (Budgeting Loans) (Applications and Miscellaneous Provisions) Regulations (Northern Ireland) 2022 |
| 223 | The Universal Credit (Administrative Earnings Threshold) (Amendment) Regulations (Northern Ireland) 2022 |
| 224 | The Coronavirus Act 2020 (Extension of Powers to Act for the Protection of Public Health) (No. 2) Order (Northern Ireland) 2022 |
| 225 | The Coronavirus Act 2020 (Registration of Deaths and Still-Births) (Extension) (No.2) Order (Northern Ireland) 2022 |
| 226 | The Coronavirus Act 2020 (Extension of Provisions Relating to Local Authority Meetings) (No 2) Order (Northern Ireland) 2022 |
| 227 | The Coronavirus Act 2020 (Extension of Provisions Relating to Live Links for Courts and Tribunals) Order (Northern Ireland) 2022 |
| 228 | The Coronavirus Act 2020 (Extension of Modifications of Requirements Regarding Medical Certificates for Cremations) (No. 3) Order (Northern Ireland) 2022 |
| 229 | The Mesothelioma Lump Sum Payments (Conditions and Amounts) (Amendment No. 2) Regulations (Northern Ireland) 2022 |
| 230 | The Social Security (Habitual Residence and Past Presence) (Amendment No. 2) Regulations (Northern Ireland) 2022 |
| 231 | The Social Security Benefits Up-rating (No. 2) Order (Northern Ireland) 2022 |
| 232 | The Social Security Benefits Up-rating (No. 2) Regulations (Northern Ireland) 2022 |
| 233 | The County Court (Amendment) Rules (Northern Ireland) 2022 |
| 234 | The Occupational Pension Schemes (Master Trusts) (No. 2) Regulations (Northern Ireland) 2022 |
| 235 (C. 24) | The Offensive Weapons Act 2019 (Commencement No. 1) Order (Northern Ireland) 2022 |
| 236 | The Parental Bereavement Leave and Pay (Consequential Amendments to Subordinate Legislation) (No. 2) Regulations (Northern Ireland) 2022 |
| 237 | The Parental Bereavement Leave (No. 2) Regulations (Northern Ireland) 2022 |
| 238 | The Statutory Parental Bereavement Pay (General) (No. 2) Regulations (Northern Ireland) 2022 |
| 239 | The Motor Vehicles (Exchangeable Licences) Order (Northern Ireland) 2022 |
| 240 | The Direct Payments to Farmers (Cross-Compliance) (Amendment) Regulations (Northern Ireland) 2022 |
| 241 | The Insolvency Practitioners (Amendment) Regulations (Northern Ireland) 2022 |
| 242 | The Insolvency (Northern Ireland) Order 1989 (Prescribed Part) (Amendment) Order (Northern Ireland) 2022 |
| 243 | The Damages for Bereavement (Variation of Sum) Order (Northern Ireland) 2022 |
| 244 | The Health and Social Care Pension Scheme (Member Contributions) (Amendment) Regulations (Northern Ireland) 2022 |
| 245 | The Health and Social Care Pensions (Abatement) (No 2) Regulations (Northern Ireland) 2022 |
| 246 | The Parking Places (Disabled Persons’ Vehicles) (Amendment No. 3) Order (Northern Ireland) 2022 |
| 247 | The Parking Places (Disabled Persons’ Vehicles) (Amendment No. 4) Order (Northern Ireland) 2022 |
| 248 | The Gas (Designation of Pipe-lines) Order (Northern Ireland) 2022 |
| 249 | The Waiting Restrictions (Gulladuff) Order (Northern Ireland) 2022 |
| 250 | The Taxis (Ballymena) Order (Northern Ireland) 2022 |
| 251 | The Parking and Waiting Restrictions (Ballymena) (Amendment) Order (Northern Ireland) 2022 |
| 252 | The County Court (Amendment No. 2) Rules (Northern Ireland) 2022 |
| 253 (C. 25) | The Domestic Abuse and Civil Proceedings Act (Northern Ireland) 2021 (Commencement No. 3) Order (Northern Ireland) 2022 |
| 254 | The Family Proceedings (Amendment) Rules (Northern Ireland) 2022 |
| 255 | The Magistrates’ Courts (Domestic Proceedings) (Amendment) Rules (Northern Ireland) 2022 |
| 256 | The Government Resources and Accounts (Northern Ireland) Act 2001 (Estimates and Accounts) (Designation of Bodies) Order 2022 |
| 257 | The Parking Places on Roads (Electric Vehicles) (Amendment) Order (Northern Ireland) 2022 |
| 258 | The Parking Places on Roads and Waiting Restrictions (Magherafelt) (Amendment No. 2) Order (Northern Ireland) 2022 |
| 259 | The Waiting Restrictions (Clogher) (Amendment) Order (Northern Ireland) 2022 |
| 260 | The Parking Places on Roads (Electric Vehicles) (Amendment No. 2) Order (Northern Ireland) 2022 |
| 261 | The Industrial Court (Membership) (Amendment) Regulations (Northern Ireland) 2022 |
| 262 | The Parking Places on Roads and Waiting Restrictions (Dungannon) (Amendment) Order (Northern Ireland) 2022 |
| 263 | The Education (Student Support, etc.) (Amendment) (No.3) Regulations (Northern Ireland) 2022 |
| 264 | The Parking and Waiting Restrictions (Larne) (Amendment) Order (Northern Ireland) 2022 |
| 265 | The Private Access on the A6 Toome By-Pass (Stopping-Up) Order (Northern Ireland) 2022 |
| 266 | The Parking and Waiting Restrictions (Ballycastle) Order (Northern Ireland) 2022 |
| 267 | The Parking and Waiting Restrictions (Londonderry) (Amendment No. 2) Order (Northern Ireland) 2022 |
| 268 | The Loading Bays and Parking Places on Roads (Amendment) Order (Northern Ireland) 2022 |
| 269 | The Waiting Restrictions (Glenarm) Order (Northern Ireland) 2022 |
| 270 | The Prohibition of Waiting (Schools) (Amendment) Order (Northern Ireland) 2022 |
| 271 | The Parking Places on Roads and Waiting Restrictions (Newry) (Amendment) Order (Northern Ireland) 2022 |
| 272 | The Scallop Enhancement Sites (Prohibited Methods of Fishing) Regulations (Northern Ireland) 2022 |
| 273 | The Coshquin Road, Londonderry (Abandonment) Order (Northern Ireland) 2022 |
| 274 | The Whitehouse Road, Londonderry (Abandonment) Order (Northern Ireland) 2022 |
| 275 | The Sulphur Content of Solid Fuel (Amendment) Regulations (Northern Ireland) 2022 |
| 276 | The General Dental Services (Amendment) Regulations (Northern Ireland) 2022 |
| 277 | The Parking and Waiting Restrictions (Lisburn) (Amendment) Order (Northern Ireland) 2022 |
| 278 | The Bus Lanes (Ballygowan Road and Castlereagh Road Corridor, Belfast) Order (Northern Ireland) 2022 |
| 279 | The Parking and Waiting Restrictions (Belfast) (Amendment) Order (Northern Ireland) 2022 |
| 280 | The Plantation Mews, Lisburn (Abandonment) Order (Northern Ireland) 2022 |
| 281 | The Prohibition of Traffic (Union Street, Belfast) Order (Northern Ireland) 2022 |
| 282 | The Footpath linking Hollyhill Link car park and Tempo Road, Enniskillen (Abandonment) Order (Northern Ireland) 2022 |
| 283 | The Prohibition of Traffic (Brunswick Street, Belfast) Order (Northern Ireland) 2022 |
| 284 | The Parking and Waiting Restrictions (Belfast) (Amendment No. 2) Order (Northern Ireland) 2022 |
| 285 | The Council of the Pharmaceutical Society of Northern Ireland (Indemnity Arrangements) Regulations (Northern Ireland) 2022 |
| 286 | The Producer Responsibility Obligations (Packaging Waste) (Amendment) Regulations (Northern Ireland) 2022 |
| 287 | Not Allocated |
| 288 | The Waste Management Licensing (Amendment) Regulations (Northern Ireland) 2022 |
| 289 (C. 26) | The Waste and Contaminated Land (Amendment) (2011 Act) (Commencement No.3) Order (Northern Ireland) 2022 |
| 290 | The Public Interest Disclosure (Prescribed Persons) (Amendment No.2) Order (Northern Ireland) 2022 |
| 291 (C. 27) | The Pension Schemes Act 2021 (Commencement No. 6) Order (Northern Ireland) 2022 |
| 292 | The Marine Protected Areas (Prohibited Methods of Fishing) Regulations (Northern Ireland) 2022 |
| 293 | The Motor Vehicles (Access to Driver Licensing Records) Regulations (Northern Ireland) 2022 |
| 294 | The Charities (Edgehill Theological College Scheme) Order (Northern Ireland) 2022 |
| 295 | The Rates (Small Business Hereditament Relief) (Amendment) (No. 2) Regulations (Northern Ireland) 2022 |
| 296 | The Pensions Dashboards Regulations (Northern Ireland) 2022 |
| 297 | The State Pension Debits and Credits (Revaluation) Order (Northern Ireland) 2022 |
| 298 | The State Pension Revaluation for Transitional Pensions Order (Northern Ireland) 2022 |
| 299 | The Mental Capacity (Research)(Amendment) Regulations (Northern Ireland) 2022 |
| 300 | The Occupational Pensions (Revaluation) Order (Northern Ireland) 2022 |
| 301 | The Pensions (2005 Order) (Disclosure of Restricted Information by the Pensions Regulator) (Amendment of Specified Persons) Order (Northern Ireland) 2022 |
| 302 | The Environmental Offences (Fixed Penalties) (Miscellaneous Provisions) (Amendment) Regulations (Northern Ireland) 2022 |
| 303 | The Marine Protected Areas (Prohibited Methods of Fishing) (Amendment) Regulations (Northern Ireland) 2022 |

== See also ==
- List of acts of the Northern Ireland Assembly from 2022
- List of acts of the Parliament of the United Kingdom from 2022
