= List of statutory rules of Northern Ireland, 2024 =

This is a list of statutory rules made in the Northern Ireland in the year 2024.

== 1-100 ==
Number	Title
1	The Rates (Small Business Hereditament Relief) (Amendment) Regulations (Northern Ireland) 2024
2	The New NAV List (Time of Valuation) Order (Northern Ireland) 2024
3	The Housing Benefit and Universal Credit Housing Costs (Executive Determinations) (Amendment) Regulations (Northern Ireland) 2024
4	The Roads (Speed Limit) Order (Northern Ireland) 2024
5	The Universal Credit (Transitional Provisions) (Amendment) Regulations (Northern Ireland) 2024
6	The Child Support Fees (Revocation) Regulations (Northern Ireland) 2024
7	The Government Resources and Accounts (Northern Ireland) Act 2001 (Estimates and Accounts) (Designation of Bodies) (Amendment) Order 2024
8	The Annesborough Industrial Estate, Lurgan (Abandonment) Order (Northern Ireland) 2024
9	The Parking Places on Roads and Waiting Restrictions (Dungannon) (Amendment) Order (Northern Ireland) 2024
10	The Roads (Speed Limit) (No. 2) Order (Northern Ireland) 2024
11	The Roads (Speed Limit) (No. 3) Order (Northern Ireland) 2024
12	The Greengraves Road, Dundonald (Abandonment and Stopping-Up) Order (Northern Ireland) 2024
13	The Cairnmartin Crescent, Belfast (Abandonment) Order (Northern Ireland) 2024
14	The Castle Lodge, Randalstown (Abandonment) Order (Northern Ireland) 2024
15	The Occupational Pension Schemes (Collective Money Purchase Schemes) Regulations (Northern Ireland) 2024
16	The Farming for the Generations Scheme Regulations (Northern Ireland) 2024
17	The Police Act 1997 (Criminal Records) (Fees) (Amendment) Regulations (Northern Ireland) 2024
18	The Universal Credit and Jobseeker's Allowance (Work Search and Work Availability Requirements - limitations) (Amendment) Regulations (Northern Ireland) 2024
19	The Education (Student Support, etc.) (Amendment) Regulations (Northern Ireland) 2024
20	The Pension Protection Fund and Occupational Pension Schemes (Levy Ceiling) Order (Northern Ireland) 2024
21	The Social Security (Gibraltar) Order (Northern Ireland) 2024
22	The Motor Vehicles (Driving Licences) (Amendment) Regulations (Northern Ireland) 2024
23	The Waiting Restrictions (Limavady) Order (Northern Ireland) 2024
24	The Parking Places (Disabled Persons’ Vehicles) (Amendment) Order (Northern Ireland) 2024
25	The Parking Places and Waiting Restrictions (Moy) (Amendment) Order (Northern Ireland) 2024
26	The Traffic Weight Restriction (Augher) Order (Northern Ireland) 2024
27	The Parking Places and Waiting Restrictions (Downpatrick) Order (Northern Ireland) 2024
28	The Rates (Regional Rates) Order (Northern Ireland) 2024
29	The Coronavirus Act 2020 (Registration of Deaths and Still-Births) (Extension) Order (Northern Ireland) 2024
30 (C. 1)	The Adoption and Children (2022 Act) (Commencement No. 2) Order (Northern Ireland) 2024
31	The Farming for the Generations Scheme (Amendment) Regulations (Northern Ireland) 2024
32	The Parking Places on Roads and Waiting Restrictions (Newry) (Amendment) Order (Northern Ireland) 2024
33	The Beechfield Drive, Donaghadee (Abandonment) Order (Northern Ireland) 2024
34	The Carrickmannon Road, Crossgar (Abandonment) Order (Northern Ireland) 2024
35	The Back Street at Botanic Avenue and Donegall Pass, Belfast (Abandonment) Order (Northern Ireland) 2024
36	The Misuse of Drugs (Amendment) Regulations (Northern Ireland) 2024
37	The Misuse of Drugs (Designation) (Amendment) Order (Northern Ireland) 2024
38	The Police Pensions (Amendment) Regulations (Northern Ireland) 2024
39	The Occupational and Personal Pension Schemes (General Levy) (Amendment) Regulations (Northern Ireland) 2024
40	The Bayhead Road, Portballintrae (Footway) (Abandonment) Order (Northern Ireland) 2024
41	The Parking and Waiting Restrictions (Enniskillen) (Amendment) Order (Northern Ireland) 2024
42	The Parking Places on Roads and Waiting Restrictions (Coalisland) Order (Northern Ireland) 2024
43	The Prohibition of Right-Hand Turn (Portstewart) Order (Northern Ireland) 2024
44	The Road Races (Circuit of Ireland Rally) Order (Northern Ireland) 2024
45	The Public Service Pensions Revaluation Order (Northern Ireland) 2024
46	The Pneumoconiosis, etc., (Workers’ Compensation) (Specified Diseases and Prescribed Occupations) (Amendment) Order (Northern Ireland) 2024
47	The Pneumoconiosis, etc., (Workers’ Compensation) (Payment of Claims) (Amendment) Regulations (Northern Ireland) 2024
48	The Pneumoconiosis, etc., (Workers’ Compensation) (Payment of Claims) (Amendment No. 2) Regulations (Northern Ireland) 2024
49	The Health and Social Care Pension Scheme (Amendment) Regulations (Northern Ireland) 2024
50	The Health and Social Care Pension Schemes (Partial Retirement etc.) Regulations (Northern Ireland) 2024
51	The Guaranteed Minimum Pensions Increase Order (Northern Ireland) 2024
52	The Social Security Revaluation of Earnings Factors Order (Northern Ireland) 2024
53	The Dungannon Road, Portadown (Abandonment) Order (Northern Ireland) 2024
54	The Social Security and Universal Credit (Migration of Tax Credit Claimants and Miscellaneous Amendments) Regulations (Northern Ireland) 2024
55	The Education (Student Loans) (Repayment) (Amendment) Regulations (Northern Ireland) 2024
56	The Recovery of Health Services Charges (Amounts) (Amendment) Regulations (Northern Ireland) 2024
57	The Coronavirus Act 2020 (Registration of Deaths and Still-Births) (Extension) (No.2) Order (Northern Ireland) 2024
58	The Benefit Cap (Annual Limit) (Amendment) Regulations (Northern Ireland) 2024
59	The Parking and Waiting Restrictions (Banbridge) (Amendment) Order (Northern Ireland) 2024
60	The Road Races (Croft Hill Climb) Order (Northern Ireland) 2024
61	The Schools (Part-Time 20 mph Speed Limit) (Amendment) Order (Northern Ireland) 2024
62	The Gilmore Street, Ballymena (Abandonment) Order (Northern Ireland) 2024
63	The Parking and Waiting Restrictions (Londonderry) (Amendment) Order (Northern Ireland) 2024
64	The Parking and Waiting Restrictions (Omagh) (Amendment) Order (Northern Ireland) 2024
65	The Prohibition of Right-Hand Turn (Enniskillen) Order (Northern Ireland) 2024
66	The Parking and Waiting Restrictions (Banbridge) (Amendment No. 2) Order (Northern Ireland) 2024
67	The Parking and Waiting Restrictions (Banbridge) (Amendment No. 3) Order (Northern Ireland) 2024
68	The Human Medicines (Amendments Relating to Coronavirus and Influenza) Regulations (Northern Ireland) 2024
69	The Social Security (2023 Benefits Up-rating) Order (Northern Ireland) 2024
70	The Mesothelioma Lump Sum Payments (2023 Conditions and Amounts) (Amendment) Regulations (Northern Ireland) 2024
71	The Social Security (2023 Benefits Up-rating) Regulations (Northern Ireland) 2024
72	The Coronavirus Act 2020 (Extension of Provisions Relating to Live Links for Courts and Tribunals) Order (Northern Ireland) 2024
73	The Social Security Benefits Up-rating Order (Northern Ireland) 2024
74	The Occupational Pension Schemes (Governance and Registration) (Amendment) Regulations (Northern Ireland) 2024
75	The Mesothelioma Lump Sum Payments (Conditions and Amounts) (Amendment) Regulations (Northern Ireland) 2024
76	The Social Security Benefits Up-rating Regulations (Northern Ireland) 2024
77	The Pensions Increase (Review) Order (Northern Ireland) 2024
78	The Occupational Pension Schemes (Master Trusts) Regulations (Northern Ireland) 2024
79	The Occupational Pension Schemes (Administration, Investment, Charges and Governance) (Amendment) Regulations (Northern Ireland) 2024
80	The Packaging Waste (Data Reporting) (No. 2) (Amendment) Regulations (Northern Ireland) 2024
81	The Proceeds of Crime Act 2002 (Application of Police and Criminal Evidence (Northern Ireland) Order 1989) (Amendment) Order (Northern Ireland) 2024
82 (C. 2)	The Economic Crime and Corporate Transparency Act 2023 (Commencement No. 1) Order (Northern Ireland) 2024
83	The Road Races (Cookstown 100 Motor Cycle Road Race) Order (Northern Ireland) 2024
84	The Road Races (Maiden City Stages Rally) Order (Northern Ireland) 2024
85	The Road Races (Craigantlet Hill Climb) Order (Northern Ireland) 2024
86	The Employment Rights (Increase of Limits) Order (Northern Ireland) 2024
87	The Rates (Temporary Rebate) (Amendment) Order (Northern Ireland) 2024
88	The Rates (Exemption for Automatic Telling Machines in Rural Areas) Order (Northern Ireland) 2024
89 (C. 3)	The Pension Schemes Act 2021 (Commencement No. 7 and Transitional Provisions) Order (Northern Ireland) 2024
90	The Occupational Pension Schemes (Funding and Investment Strategy and Amendment) Regulations (Northern Ireland) 2024
91	The Road Races (North West 200) Order (Northern Ireland) 2024
92 (C. 4)	The Period Products (Free Provision) (2022 Act) (Commencement No.2) Order (Northern Ireland) 2024
93	The Climate Change (Reporting Bodies) Regulations (Northern Ireland) 2024
94	The Period Products (Department of Education Specified Public Service Bodies) Regulations (Northern Ireland) 2024
95	The Period Products (Department of Agriculture, Environment and Rural Affairs Specified Public Service Bodies) Regulations (Northern Ireland) 2024
96	The Parking and Waiting Restrictions (Carrickfergus) (Amendment) Order (Northern Ireland) 2024
97	The Parking and Waiting Restrictions (Larne) Order (Northern Ireland) 2024
98	The Waiting Restrictions (Ballygally) Order (Northern Ireland) 2024
99	The Registered Rents (Increase) Order (Northern Ireland) 2024
100	The Road Races (Tour of the Sperrins) Order (Northern Ireland) 2024

== 101-200 ==
Number	Title
101	The Period Products (the Department for the Economy Specified Public Service Bodies) Regulations (Northern Ireland) 2024
102	The Lay Magistrates (Eligibility) Order (Northern Ireland) 2024
103	The Period Products (Department of Justice Specified Public Service Bodies) Regulations (Northern Ireland) 2024
104	The Road Races (Spamount Hill Climb) Order (Northern Ireland) 2024
105	The Alleyway to the rear of Nos. 92-122 Royal Avenue, Belfast (Abandonment) Order (Northern Ireland) 2024
106	The Judicial Pensions (Remediable Service etc.) (Amendment) Regulations (Northern Ireland) 2024
107	The Universal Credit (Administrative Earnings Threshold) (Amendment) Regulations (Northern Ireland) 2024
108	The Planning (Fees) (Amendment) Regulations (Northern Ireland) 2024
109	The Parking Places and Waiting Restrictions (Moy) (Amendment No. 2) Order (Northern Ireland) 2024
110	The Prohibition of Waiting (Schools) (Amendment) Order (Northern Ireland) 2024
111	The Parkgate Avenue, Belfast (Abandonment) Order (Northern Ireland) 2024
112	The Waiting Restrictions (Eglinton) Order (Northern Ireland) 2024
113	The Road Races (Drumhorc Hill Climb) Order (Northern Ireland) 2024
114	The Government Resources and Accounts (Northern Ireland) Act 2001 (Estimates and Accounts) (Designation of Bodies) Order 2024
115	The Agriculture (Student Fees) (Amendment) Regulations (Northern Ireland) 2024
116	The Health and Social Care Pension Scheme (Member Contributions) (Amendment) Regulations (Northern Ireland) 2024
117	The Health and Social Care Pension Schemes (Amendment No.2) Regulations (Northern Ireland) 2024
118 (C. 5)	The Welfare Reform (Northern Ireland) Order 2015 (Commencement No. 13 and Savings and Transitional Provisions) (Amendment) Order (Northern Ireland) 2024
119	The Social Security (State Pension Age Claimants: Closure of Tax Credits) (Amendment) Regulations (Northern Ireland) 2024
120	The Prohibition of U-Turn (Ballygawley) Order (Northern Ireland) 2024
121	The Road Races (Cairncastle Hill Climb) Order (Northern Ireland) 2024
122	The Period Products (Department for Infrastructure Specified Public Service Bodies) Regulations (Northern Ireland) 2024
123	The Smoke, Heat and Carbon Monoxide Alarms for Private Tenancies Regulations (Northern Ireland) 2024
124	The Whole of Government Accounts (Designation of Bodies) Order (Northern Ireland) 2024
125	The Human Medicines (Amendment Relating to Original Pack Dispensing) Regulations (Northern Ireland) 2024
126	The Road Races (Loughgall Stages Rally) Order (Northern Ireland) 2024
127	The Optical Charges and Payments (Amendment) Regulations (Northern Ireland) 2024
128	The Further Education (Student Support) (Eligibility) (Amendment) Regulations (Northern Ireland) 2024
129	The Waiting Restrictions (Royal Hillsborough) Order (Northern Ireland) 2024
130	The Firefighters’ Pension Schemes and Compensation Scheme (Amendment) Regulations (Northern Ireland) 2024
131	The Pensions (2005 Order) (Codes of Practice) (Revocation) Order (Northern Ireland) 2024
132	The Pensions (2005 Order) (Code of Practice) (General) (Appointed Day, Amendment and Revocations) Order (Northern Ireland) 2024
133	The Dangerous Dogs (Designated Types) Order (Northern Ireland) 2024
134	The Lurgan Road, Portadown (Stopping-Up) Order (Northern Ireland) 2024
135	The Kings Lane, Warrenpoint (Stopping-Up) Order (Northern Ireland) 2024
136	The Occupational Pension Schemes (Collective Money Purchase Schemes) (Amendment) Regulations (Northern Ireland) 2024
137	The Damages (Process for Setting Rate of Return) Regulations (Northern Ireland) 2024
138	The Police Pensions (Remediable Service) (Amendment) Regulations (Northern Ireland) 2024
139	The Proceeds of Crime Act 2002 (Search, Recovery of Cryptoassets and Investigations: Codes of Practice) Order (Northern Ireland) 2024
140	The Local Government (Remote Meetings) Regulations (Northern Ireland) 2024
141	The Fisheries Act 2020 (Scheme for Financial Assistance) Regulations (Northern Ireland) 2024
142	The Parking and Waiting Restrictions (Bangor) Order (Northern Ireland) 2024
143	The Waiting Restrictions (Cloughey) Order (Northern Ireland) 2024
144	The U8133 (unnamed road) off Friary Road, Newtownhamilton (Abandonment) Order (Northern Ireland) 2024
145	The Footway between Peters Hill and Clifton Street, Belfast (Abandonment) Order (Northern Ireland) 2024
146	The Industrial Training Levy (Construction Industry) Order (Northern Ireland) 2024
147	The Police Service of Northern Ireland and Police Service of Northern Ireland Reserve (Injury Benefit) (Amendment) (No. 2) Regulations 2024
148	The Parking Places on Roads, Waiting Restrictions and Motor Hackney Carriages (Belfast) By-Laws (Amendment) Order (Northern Ireland) 2024
149	The Bus Lanes (Belfast City Centre) (Amendment) Order (Northern Ireland) 2024
150	The Road Races (Armoy Motorcycle Road Race) Order (Northern Ireland) 2024
151	The Road Races (Garron Point Hill Climb) Order (Northern Ireland) 2024
152	The Insolvency (Monetary Limits) (Amendment) Order (Northern Ireland) 2024
153	The Working Time (Amendment) Regulations (Northern Ireland) 2024
154	The Road Races (Ulster Rally) Order (Northern Ireland) 2024
155	The Dangerous Dogs (Compensation and Exemption Schemes) Order (Northern Ireland) 2024
156 (C. 6)	The Pet Abduction (2024 Act) (Commencement) Order (Northern Ireland) 2024
157	The Education (Student Support, etc.) (Amendment No.2) Regulations (Northern Ireland) 2024
158	The Road Races (Bushwhacker Rally) Order (Northern Ireland) 2024
159	The Local Government Pension Scheme (Amendment) Regulations (Northern Ireland) 2024
160	The Social Fund Winter Fuel Payment Regulations (Northern Ireland) 2024
161	The Personal Protective Equipment at Work (Amendment) Regulations (Northern Ireland) 2024
162	The Recovery of Health Services Charges (Amounts) (Amendment No. 2) Regulations (Northern Ireland) 2024
163	The Social Security (Genuine and Sufficient Link to the United Kingdom) (Amendment) Regulations (Northern Ireland) 2024
164	The Parking Places (Disabled Persons’ Vehicles) (Amendment No. 2) Order (Northern Ireland) 2024
165	The Armagh Road, Moy (Abandonment) Order (Northern Ireland) 2024
166	The Moyraverty Centre, Craigavon (Abandonment) Order (Northern Ireland) 2024
167	The Parking and Waiting Restrictions (Newtownards) Order (Northern Ireland) 2024
168	The Roads (Speed Limit) (No. 4) Order (Northern Ireland) 2024
169	The Waiting Restrictions (Augher) Order (Northern Ireland) 2024
170	The Parking Places (Disabled Persons’ Vehicles) (Amendment No. 3) Order (Northern Ireland) 2024
171	The Hops Certification (Amendment) Regulations (Northern Ireland) 2024
172	The Coronavirus Act 2020 (Registration of Deaths and Still-Births) (Extension) (No.3) Order (Northern Ireland) 2024
173	The Coronavirus Act 2020 (Extension of Provisions Relating to Live Links for Courts and Tribunals) (No.2) Order (Northern Ireland) 2024
174	The Social Security (Infected Blood Capital Disregard) (Amendment) Regulations (Northern Ireland) 2024
175	The Cycle Routes (Amendment) Order (Northern Ireland) 2024
176	The Planning (General Development Procedure) (Amendment) Order (Northern Ireland) 2024
177	The Rules of the Court of Judicature (Northern Ireland) (Amendment) 2024
178	The Trunk Road T3 [Western Transport Corridor – Sion Mills (North) to Ballygawley (West)] Order (Northern Ireland) 2024
179	The Parking Places (Disabled Persons’ Vehicles) (Amendment No. 4) Order (Northern Ireland) 2024
180	The Parking and Waiting Restrictions (Belfast) (Amendment) Order (Northern Ireland) 2024
181	The Parking Places (Disabled Persons’ Vehicles) (Amendment No. 5) Order (Northern Ireland) 2024
182	The Parking and Waiting Restrictions (Derry/Londonderry) Order (Northern Ireland) 2024
183	The Parking Places on Roads (Electric Vehicles) Order (Northern Ireland) 2024
184	The Private Accesses on the A5 Western Transport Corridor – Sion Mills (North) to Ballygawley (West) (Stopping-Up) Order (Northern Ireland) 2024
185	The Period Products (the Executive Office Specified Public Service Bodies) Regulations (Northern Ireland) 2024
186 (C. 7)	The Adoption and Children (2022 Act) (Commencement No.3) Order (Northern Ireland) 2024
187	The Coopers Mill Park, Dundonald (Abandonment) Order (Northern Ireland) 2024
188	The Drumna Walk, Lurgan (Abandonment) Order (Northern Ireland) 2024
189	The Social Fund Winter Fuel Payment (Amendment) Regulations (Northern Ireland) 2024
190	The Waring Street, Lurgan (Abandonment) Order (Northern Ireland) 2024
191	The Building (Amendment) Regulations (Northern Ireland) 2024
192	The Pensions (2005 Order) (Code of Practice) (Defined Benefit Funding) (Appointed Day) Order (Northern Ireland) 2024
193	The Roads (Speed Limit) (No. 5) Order (Northern Ireland) 2024
194	The Waiting Restrictions (Draperstown) Order (Northern Ireland) 2024
195	The Schools (Part-Time 20mph Speed Limit) (Amendment No. 2) Order (Northern Ireland) 2024
196	The Bread and Flour (Amendment) Regulations (Northern Ireland) 2024
197	The Industrial Tribunals and Fair Employment Tribunal (Constitution and Rules of Procedure) (Amendment) Regulations (Northern Ireland) 2024
198	The State Pension Debits and Credits (Revaluation) Order (Northern Ireland) 2024
199	The State Pension Revaluation for Transitional Pensions Order (Northern Ireland) 2024
200	The Occupational Pensions (Revaluation) Order (Northern Ireland) 2024

== 201-226 ==
Number	Title
201	The Electrical Safety Standards for Private Tenancies Regulations (Northern Ireland) 2024
202	The Marcus Ward Street, Belfast (Abandonment) Order (Northern Ireland) 2024
203	The Fair Employment (Monitoring) (Amendment) Regulations (Northern Ireland) 2024
204	The Marine Licensing (Application Fees) (Amendment) Regulations (Northern Ireland) 2024
205	The Waiting Restrictions (Whitehead) Order (Northern Ireland) 2024
206	The Loading Bays on Roads (Amendment) Order (Northern Ireland) 2024
207	The On-Street Parking (Amendment) Order (Northern Ireland) 2024
208	The Urban Clearways (Amendment) Order (Northern Ireland) 2024
209	The Parking and Waiting Restrictions (Limavady) Order (Northern Ireland) 2024
210	The Parking Places on Roads (Saintfield) Order (Northern Ireland) 2024
211	The Direct Payments to Farmers (Cross-Compliance) (Amendment) Regulations (Northern Ireland) 2024 (revoked)
212	The Environmental Protection (Single-use Vapes) Regulations (Northern Ireland) 2024
213	The Motor Vehicles (Driving Licences) (Amendment No. 2) Regulations (Northern Ireland) 2024
214	The Climate Change (2040 Emissions Target) Regulations (Northern Ireland) 2024
215	The Climate Change (Carbon Budgets 2023-2037) Regulations (Northern Ireland) 2024
216	The Public Interest Disclosure (Prescribed Persons) (Amendment) Order (Northern Ireland) 2024 (revoked)
217	The Government Resources and Accounts (Northern Ireland) Act 2001 (Estimates and Accounts) (Designation of Bodies) (Amendment) Order 2024
218	The Firefighters’ Pension Schemes and Compensation Scheme (Amendment) (No. 2) Regulations (Northern Ireland) 2024
219	The Police Pensions (Amendment No. 2) Regulations (Northern Ireland) 2024
220	The Parking and Waiting Restrictions (Belfast) (Amendment No. 2) Order (Northern Ireland) 2024
221	The Parking and Waiting Restrictions (Fivemiletown) Order (Northern Ireland) 2024
222	The Misuse of Drugs (Amendment No.2) Regulations (Northern Ireland) 2024
223	The Misuse of Drugs (Designation) (Amendment No. 2) Order (Northern Ireland) 2024
224	The Insolvency (Amendment) Rules (Northern Ireland) 2024
225	The Bovine Viral Diarrhoea Eradication Scheme (Amendment) Order (Northern Ireland) 2024
226	The Bovine Viral Diarrhoea Control Order (Northern Ireland) 2024

== See also ==
- List of acts of the Northern Ireland Assembly from 2024
- List of acts of the Parliament of the United Kingdom from 2024
