= List of acts of the Northern Ireland Assembly from 2011 =

This is a list of acts of the Northern Ireland Assembly passed in 2011. Acts of the Northern Ireland Assembly are enacted by the Northern Ireland Assembly, which has legislative authority over devolved matters in relation to Northern Ireland under the authority of the Northern Ireland Act 1998. Acts are cited by calendar year, in the same fashion as acts of Parliament of the United Kingdom. Each act passed in a respective year is given a chapter number (abbreviated "c.") denoted by Arabic numerals, and citations are usually followed by the suffix "(N.I.)" so as to prevent confusion with acts of Parliament of the United Kingdom.

29 acts of the Northern Ireland Assembly were passed in 2011.

indicates that an act has been transcribed on Wikisource, indicates that an act is available to view at legislation.gov.uk, and indicates the location of the original act in the Parliamentary Archives.

== Acts of the Northern Ireland Assembly ==
Short title	Citation	Royal assent
Long title
Commissioner for Older People Act (Northern Ireland) 2011	2011 c. 1 (N.I.)	25 January 2011
An Act to provide for the appointment and functions of the Commissioner for Older People for Northern Ireland.
Student Loans (Amendment) Act (Northern Ireland) 2011	2011 c. 2 (N.I.)	25 January 2011
An Act to amend the law relating to student loans.
Tourism (Amendment) Act (Northern Ireland) 2011	2011 c. 3 (N.I.)	25 January 2011
An Act to increase the period between statutory inspections of certified tourist establishments; to provide for reviews in respect of such establishments between statutory inspections; to confer power on the Northern Ireland Tourist Board to provide financial assistance for the provision or improvement of tourist accommodation; to amend the procedure for appointing the chairman of the Northern Ireland Tourist Board; and for connected purposes.
Construction Contracts (Amendment) Act (Northern Ireland) 2011	2011 c. 4 (N.I.)	10 February 2011
An Act to amend the Construction Contracts (Northern Ireland) Order 1997. (Note: Construction Contracts (Northern Ireland) Order 1997 (SI 1997/274))
Waste and Contaminated Land (Amendment) Act (Northern Ireland) 2011	2011 c. 5 (N.I.)	10 February 2011
An Act to amend the Waste and Contaminated Land (Northern Ireland) Order 1997 (Note: Waste and Contaminated Land (Northern Ireland) Order 1997 (SI 1997/2778)) and the Producer Responsibility Obligations (Northern Ireland) Order 1998. (Note: Producer Responsibility Obligations (Northern Ireland) Order 1998 (SI 1998/1762))
Energy Act (Northern Ireland) 2011	2011 c. 6 (N.I.)	10 February 2011
An Act to make further provision in connection with the regulation of the gas and electricity industries.
Safeguarding Board Act (Northern Ireland) 2011	2011 c. 7 (N.I.)	10 February 2011
An Act to make provision to establish the Safeguarding Board for Northern Ireland; and for connected purpose.
Allowances to Members of the Assembly (Repeal) Act (Northern Ireland) 2011	2011 c. 8 (N.I.)	10 February 2011
An Act to repeal the Allowances to Members of the Assembly Act (Northern Ireland) 2000. (Note: Allowances to Members of the Assembly Act (Northern Ireland) 2000 (c. 3 (N.I.)))
Dogs (Amendment) Act (Northern Ireland) 2011	2011 c. 9 (N.I.)	8 March 2011
An Act to amend the law relating to dogs.
Local Government Finance Act (Northern Ireland) 2011	2011 c. 10 (N.I.)	16 March 2011
An Act to make provision for the financial affairs of district councils; to make provision relating to grants to district councils and for payments to councillors and other payments by district councils.
Transport Act (Northern Ireland) 2011	2011 c. 11 (N.I.)	16 March 2011
An Act to make provision relating to public passenger transport and ancillary services; and for connected purposes.
Caravans Act (Northern Ireland) 2011	2011 c. 12 (N.I.)	16 March 2011
An Act to amend the law relating to caravans and caravan sites.
Employment Act (Northern Ireland) 2011	2011 c. 13 (N.I.)	22 March 2011
An Act to make provision about the procedures for the resolution of employment disputes and the procedures of industrial tribunals and the Fair Employment Tribunal; to make provision in relation to time off for study or training; and for connected purpose.
Budget Act (Northern Ireland) 2011 (repealed)	2011 c. 14 (N.I.)	22 March 2011
An Act to authorise the issue out of the Consolidated Fund of certain sums for the service of the years ending 31st March 2011 and 2012; to appropriate those sums for specified purposes; to authorise the Department of Finance and Personnel to borrow on the credit of the appropriated sums; to authorise the use for the public service of certain resources for the years ending 31st March 2011 and 2012; and to revise the limits on the use of certain accruing resources in the year ending 31st March 2011. (Repealed by Budget (No. 2) Act (Northern Ireland) 2014 (c. 7 (N.I.)))
Wildlife and Natural Environment Act (Northern Ireland) 2011	2011 c. 15 (N.I.)	29 March 2011
An Act to make provision about biodiversity; to amend the Wildlife (Northern Ireland) Order 1985 (Note: Wildlife (Northern Ireland) Order 1985 (SI 1985/171)) and Part 4 of the Environment (Northern Ireland) Order 2002; (Note: Environment (Northern Ireland) Order 2002 (SI 2002/3153)) to abolish game licences and game dealers' licences; to prohibit hare coursing events; to amend the Game Preservation Act (Northern Ireland) 1928; (Note: Game Preservation Act (Northern Ireland) 1928 (18 & 19 Geo. 5. c. 25 (N.I.))) and for connected purposes.
Welfare of Animals Act (Northern Ireland) 2011	2011 c. 16 (N.I.)	29 March 2011
An Act to make provision about animal welfare.
Assembly Members (Independent Financial Review and Standards) Act (Northern Ireland) 2011	2011 c. 17 (N.I.)	29 March 2011
An Act to make provision for a Panel to determine the salaries, allowances, pensions and gratuities payable to members and former members of the Northern Ireland Assembly; to make provision for a Northern Ireland Assembly Commissioner for Standards; and for connected purposes.
Licensing and Registration of Clubs (Amendment) Act (Northern Ireland) 2011	2011 c. 18 (N.I.)	29 March 2011
An Act to make provision in relation to liquor licensing and registration of clubs.
Sunbeds Act (Northern Ireland) 2011	2011 c. 19 (N.I.)	3 May 2011
An Act to make provision about the use or supply of tanning devices that use ultraviolet radiation; and for connected purposes.
Civil Registration Act (Northern Ireland) 2011	2011 c. 20 (N.I.)	3 May 2011
An Act to amend the Births and Deaths Registration (Northern Ireland) Order 1976 (Note: Births and Deaths Registration (Northern Ireland) Order 1976 (SI 1976/1041)) and the Presumption of Death Act (Northern Ireland) 2009; (Note: Presumption of Death Act (Northern Ireland) 2009 (c. 6 (N.I.))) to provide for access to information relating to marriages and civil partnerships and information contained in the Adopted Children Register and the Gender Recognition Register, for the notification of the registration of marriages and civil partnerships, for the Registrar General to supply commemorative documents and for a register called the Record of Northern Ireland Connections; and for connected purposes.
High Hedges Act (Northern Ireland) 2011	2011 c. 21 (N.I.)	3 May 2011
An Act to provide for the control of high hedges.
Housing (Amendment) Act (Northern Ireland) 2011	2011 c. 22 (N.I.)	3 May 2011
An Act to amend the law relating to housing.
Clean Neighbourhoods and Environment Act (Northern Ireland) 2011	2011 c. 23 (N.I.)	4 May 2011
An Act to make provision for the gating of certain minor roads; to make provision in relation to vehicles parked on roads that are exposed for sale or being repaired; to make provision in relation to abandoned vehicles and the removal and disposal of vehicles; to make provision in relation to litter and graffiti, fly-posting and the display of advertisements; to make provision relating to the control of dogs; to make provision in relation to noise; to restate the law on statutory nuisances and improve the summary procedures for dealing with them; to increase the maximum penalty in relation to certain pollution offences; and for connected purposes.
Justice Act (Northern Ireland) 2011	2011 c. 24 (N.I.)	4 May 2011
An Act to make provision for an offender levy; to amend the law relating to measures for vulnerable and intimidated witnesses and live links; to make provision for policing and community safety partnerships; to make provision regulating certain sporting events; to amend the law relating to the treatment of offenders; to make provision for penalty notices and conditional cautions; to amend the law on legal aid; to confer additional rights of audience on certain solicitors; to amend the law on bail; to make other amendments relating to the administration of civil and criminal justice; and for connected purposes.
Planning Act (Northern Ireland) 2011	2011 c. 25 (N.I.)	4 May 2011
An Act to make provision in relation to planning; and for connected purposes.
Single Use Carrier Bags Act (Northern Ireland) 2011	2011 c. 26 (N.I.)	4 May 2011
An Act to make provision for the payment of charges under Schedule 6 to the Climate Change Act 2008 (Note: Climate Change Act 2008 (c. 27)) for single use carrier bags to the Department of the Environment; and for connected purposes.
Autism Act (Northern Ireland) 2011	2011 c. 27 (N.I.)	9 May 2011
An Act to amend the Disability Discrimination Act 1995 (Note: Disability Discrimination Act 1995 (c. 50)) and to require an autism strategy to be prepared.
Damages (Asbestos-related Conditions) Act (Northern Ireland) 2011	2011 c. 28 (N.I.)	21 June 2011 (Note: The Queen's Printer edition erroneously states that royal assent was given on 25 July 2011, but the Journal of Proceedings of the Northern Ireland Assembly confirms that it was in fact given on 21 June.)
An Act to (Note: The Queen's Printer edition erroneously omits the words "An Act to" from the long title.) Provide that certain asbestos-related conditions are actionable personal injuries; and for connected purposes.
Budget (No. 2) Act (Northern Ireland) 2011 (repealed)	2011 c. 29 (N.I.)	25 July 2011
An Act to authorise the issue out of the Consolidated Fund of certain sums for the service of the year ending 31st March 2012; to appropriate those sums for specified purposes; to authorise the Department of Finance and Personnel to borrow on the credit of the appropriated sums; to authorise the use for the public service of certain resources (including accruing resources) for the year ending 31st March 2012; to authorise the issue out of the Consolidated Fund of an excess cash sum for the service of the year ending 31st March 2010; to authorise the use for the public service of excess resources for the year ending 31st March 2010; and to repeal certain spent provisions. (Repealed by Budget (No. 2) Act (Northern Ireland) 2014 (c. 7 (N.I.)))
