= National Health Service hospital parking =

British hospital parking

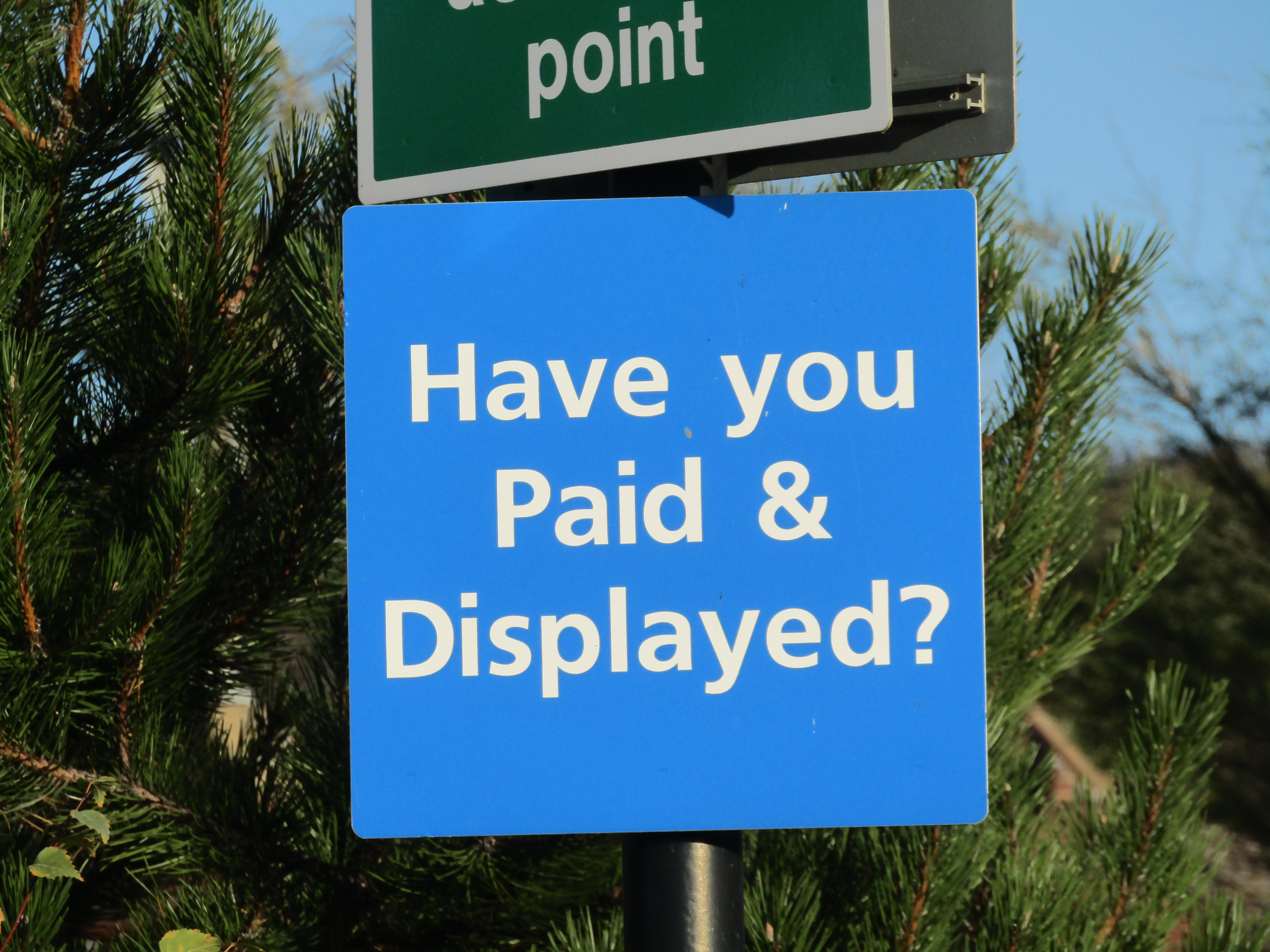
A sign in a hospital car park in Cromer reminding people to pay for parking.

In the United Kingdom, various NHS hospitals charge patients and staff for parking. In Scotland and Wales car parking fees were largely abolished in 2008. As of April 2022, NHS organisations in England may optionally charge patients, visitors or staff for parking, the temporary suspension of fees during COVID-19 having been lifted. The cost of hospital parking is a controversial topic, with opponents in England criticising the charges.

== Rationale for parking charges ==
The cost of running secure car parking is substantial. If a surplus is generated it is used to pay for healthcare. In many hospital sites there is a shortage of car parking space and making it free will encourage people to come to hospital by car without generating any extra space. Where hospital parking is already free it may be used by people who are not visiting the hospital, and it does nothing to discourage the inappropriate use of cars.

Many NHS car park have been funded under PFI arrangements, with a private operator funding the investment to build and operate the car park in exchange for a proportion of the fees generated.

== Arguments against parking charges ==
Parking charges at hospitals have been criticised for their particular impact on elderly people. The Daily Telegraph stated in 2012 that elderly people were more likely to travel to the hospital by car than other groups.

== Parking charges by country ==
=== England ===
A third of hospitals in England increased their car parking charges in 2019. The total raised from parking fees was £254 million. A survey of 7,800 people found 86% said parking added to the stress of their hospital visit and they described the fees as a "rip-off", "extortionate" and "astronomical". Car parking fees were an issue in the 2019 United Kingdom general election. After the election Matt Hancock announced that all the 206 NHS hospital trusts in England would be expected to provide free car parking from April 2020 to people that may be frequent hospital visitors, or those disproportionately impacted by daily or hourly charges for parking, including blue badge holders, frequent outpatient attenders, parents staying overnight with sick children in hospital, and NHS staff working nightshifts. This timetable was disrupted by the COVID-19 pandemic in England but NHS England ordered NHS trusts to permanently offer free car parking to night shift staff and some patient groups from April 2021.

=== Scotland ===
Claims by the Scottish National Party in 2019 that parking fees have been removed from all NHS hospitals in Scotland have been contested because there are still fees at Ninewells Hospital, Glasgow Royal Infirmary and Royal Infirmary of Edinburgh, set up as part of the private finance initiative deals. However, in 2021, the Scottish Government announced that the charges would be abolished after reaching a £35 million deal to buy car parks at those hospitals.

=== Wales ===
There have been attacks on cars in the car park at Wrexham Maelor Hospital which apparently is not adequately supervised. Local residents have called for charges to pay for better security.

Cardiff and Vale University Health Board permit free parking for four hours and an additional four hours free by entering their registration into electronic screens in the hospitals. From February 2020 they are proposing to reduce the additional hours to two, to "reduce inappropriate parking on hospital sites". The Community Health Council say that problems are caused by administration and non-clinical staff abusing the system when they should be using the park and ride system.

=== Northern Ireland ===
The National Health Service does not extend to Northern Ireland, but essentially Health and Social Care has equivalent rules.

From 2016/17 to 2018/19 the Northern Ireland health trusts collected £15,673,977 from hospital car parking charges. More £2.8 million of that was charges for staff parking. Charges are decided individually by the trusts. The campaign group Patient Voice NI said no patient or employee should have to pay to park at a hospital.

Hospital Parking Charges Act (Northern Ireland) 2022
- Act of the Northern Ireland Assembly
- Northern Ireland Assembly
- Long title: An Act to prohibit the imposition of charges for parking vehicles in hospital car parks.
- Citation: 2022 c. 24 (N.I.)
- Introduced by: Fra McCann MLA

Dates
- Royal assent: 12 May 2022
- Commencement: 12 May 2024

Status: Current legislation

History of passage through the Assembly

Text of statute as originally enacted

Text of the Hospital Parking Charges Act (Northern Ireland) 2022 as in force today (including any amendments) within the United Kingdom, from legislation.gov.uk.

Hospital parking charges were going to be banned from 12 May 2024 under the Hospital Parking Charges Act (Northern Ireland) 2022 (c. 24 (N.I.)), an act of the Northern Ireland Assembly.

Hospital Parking Charges Act (Northern Ireland) 2024
- Act of the Northern Ireland Assembly
- Northern Ireland Assembly
- Long title: An Act to modify the operation of the Hospital Parking Charges Act (Northern Ireland) 2022[a] so as to postpone the ban on charging money for parking vehicles in hospital car parks.
- Citation: 2024 c. 2 (N.I.)
- Introduced by: Robin Swann MLA, Minister of Health

Dates
- Royal assent: 16 May 2024
- Commencement: 17 May 2024

Status: Current legislation

History of passage through the Assembly

Text of statute as originally enacted

Text of the Hospital Parking Charges Act (Northern Ireland) 2024 as in force today (including any amendments) within the United Kingdom, from legislation.gov.uk.

This was delayed until 12 May 2026 with the passage of the Hospital Parking Charges Act (Northern Ireland) 2024 (c. 2 (N.I.)), an act of the Northern Ireland Assembly.

Hospital Parking Charges Act (Northern Ireland) 2026
- Act of the Northern Ireland Assembly
- Northern Ireland Assembly
- Long title: An Act to further postpone the ban under the Hospital Parking Charges Act (Northern Ireland) 2022 on charging money for parking vehicles in hospital car parks.
- Citation: 2026 c. 4 (N.I.)
- Introduced by: Mike Nesbitt MLA, Minister of Health

Dates
- Royal assent: 6 May 2026
- Commencement: 7 May 2026

Status: Current legislation

History of passage through the Assembly

Text of statute as originally enacted

Text of the Hospital Parking Charges Act (Northern Ireland) 2026 as in force today (including any amendments) within the United Kingdom, from legislation.gov.uk.

This was again delayed until 12 May 2029 with the passage of the Hospital Parking Charges Act (Northern Ireland) 2026 (c. 6 (N.I.)), an act of the Northern Ireland Assembly.

== Financial help ==
People who do have to pay charges may be eligible for help under the Healthcare Travel Costs Scheme.
