= Healthcare Travel Costs Scheme =

Travel cost reimbursement scheme for the National Health Service

The Healthcare Travel Costs Scheme was established across the United Kingdom National Health Service in 1988. Patients and their children in receipt of means tested benefits, or on a low income, can get help with the cost of travel to hospital appointments. It does not apply to primary care or community services, and it does not apply to visitors.

== History ==
The legal basis was the National Health Service (Travelling Expenses and Remission of Charges) Regulations SI no 551 of 1988. Before 1988, there was a scheme but there was no statutory basis and the costs incurred were met centrally. From 1988, Health Authorities met the cost of expenditure. Subsequently, costs were transferred to NHS trusts. New regulations were introduced by the National Health Service (Travel Expenses and Remission of Charges) Regulations 2003.

People who qualified for Income Support or Family Credit qualified for payment of full fares. Others could apply for remission, with a means test based on the Income Support rules.

== Qualifying benefits ==
In 2019 the qualifying benefits were:

- Income Support
- income-based Jobseeker's Allowance
- income-related Employment and Support Allowance
- Working Tax Credit with Child Tax Credit, a disability element or a severe disability element
- Child Tax Credit for people not eligible for Working Tax Credit
- Pension Credit Guarantee Credit
- Universal Credit with net earnings of £435 or less in the last Universal Credit assessment period, or with an element for a child, or limited capability for work or limited capability for work and work-related activity, with net earnings of less than £935

People assessed under the NHS Low Income Scheme may qualify for full or partial help.

== Entitlement ==
Costs reimbursed are normally for the cheapest suitable mode of transport for the patient's circumstances. This may include the cost of a carer, or of accompanying children. In most cases this in will be public transport. If a car is used, reimbursement will be for the cost of fuel at the local mileage rate, and unavoidable car parking and toll charges. It is not uncommon for the cost of taxi fares to be refused, but they are payable if they are reasonably required. It is possible to get an advance payment to help attend an appointment. Claims must be made within three months. Claims are normally made at the hospital but may be made in arrears, in England, to the Clinical Commissioning Group.

== Administration ==
Manchester Health Authority produced a report on the working of the scheme in Greater Manchester in 1997. They found a wide variation in the amounts paid out by different hospitals, without any obvious explanation of the differences. Some hospitals were reported as adopting a Poor Law approach. Patients are expect to take proof that they are eligible to a nominated cashiers' office. If they don't have the evidence they may be told to return with it. Many cashiers offices close at 4pm, but patients' appointments may be later. The benefit system changes but hospitals may not keep up with the changes.

== See also ==
- National Health Service hospital parking
