= School-leaving age =

The school leaving age is the minimum age a person is legally allowed to cease attendance at an institute of compulsory secondary education. Most countries have their school-leaving age set the same as their minimum full-time employment age, thus allowing smooth transition from education into employment, whilst a few have it set just below the age at which a person is allowed to be employed.

In contrast, there are numerous countries that have several years between their school-leaving age and their legal minimum employment age, thus in some cases preventing any such transition for several years. Countries which have their employment age set below the school-leaving age (mostly developing countries) risk giving children the opportunity to leave their education early to earn money for themselves or their families.

== Leaving age by country ==
Some countries have different leaving or employment ages, but in certain countries like China and Japan, the average age at which people graduate is 15, depending upon part-time or full-time learning or employment. The table below states the school-leaving ages in countries across the world and their respective minimum employment age, showing a comparison of how many countries have synchronized these ages. All information is taken from the Right to Education Project's table unless otherwise indicated.

Color legend	Age legend
Ages unsynchronised: School leaving age higher	(13) denotes part-time employment available from 13
Ages unsynchronised: Employment age higher	? denotes the age set is unknown
Ages synchronised: Mixed
Ages synchronised
No information / No age set / Age varies by jurisdiction

=== Africa ===
Age gap	Country	De jure		Year	Notes
Age gap	Country	School leaving age	Employment age	Year	Notes
0	Algeria	16		2011	
2	Angola	12	14	2010	
	Benin	?	14	2005	
	Botswana	?	15	2004	
-1	Burkina Faso	16	15	2009	
4	Burundi	12	16	2010	
0	Cameroon	14		2001	
-2	Cape Verde	16	14	2001	
	Chad	15	?	2007	
	Comoros	14	?	1998	
0	Congo	16		2006	
0	Egypt	14		2010	
1	Eritrea	13	14	2007	
	Ethiopia	?		2005	
0	Gabon	16		2001	
	Gambia	?		2000	
-3	Ghana	15	12	2005	
0	Guinea	16		2012	
	Kenya	?	13?	2006	
0	Libya	15	15	2002	
4	Madagascar	10	14	2010	
	Malawi	?	14	2008	
	Mozambique	?	15	2009	
	Morocco	13	16?	2003	
-2	Namibia	16	14	2011	
-2	Niger	16	14	2008	
-3	Nigeria	15	12	2020	
0	Rwanda	16		2012	
-1	Senegal	16	15	2006	
0	Seychelles	15		2011	
	Sierra Leone	15?	?	2006	
-2	Somalia	17	15	2018	
0	South Africa	15		2011	A child between the ages of 15 and 18 may only be employed if they have completed grade 9.
	Sudan	?	14	2010	Includes South Sudan
	Tanzania	13?	14	2005	
-1	Togo	15	14	2010	
0	Tunisia	16		2008	
	Uganda	?		2004	
	Zambia	?		2002	
	Zimbabwe	?		1995	

=== Americas ===
Age gap	Country	De jure		Year	Notes
Age gap	Country	School leaving age	Employment age	Year	Notes
	Argentina	18	16	2008	
	Barbados	16	16?	1997	
0	Belize	14		2004	
-2	Bolivia	16	14	2009	
-2 -4	Brazil	18	16 14 for apprentices	2009	Schooling is mandatory for children aged 4–17 (years 1–12 in the new Brazilian school system). After that, there is no legal obligation to stay in school. Students who want to qualify for university admission must however complete three additional years (years 10–12) of secondary school (ensino médio), thus normally leaving school at age 18. The minimum age for legal work is 16, and 14 for apprentices. If the student's birthday date is between 1 January and 31 March, the age is 17, while if the student's birthday date is between 1 April and 31 December, then the age is 18, and occurs in the last day of 12th grade (early-mid December).
	Canada	16–18; varies by jurisdiction	12–18; varies by jurisdiction and industry	2014	The school leaving age is 16 in all Canadian provinces and territories except the provinces of Manitoba, New Brunswick, and Ontario, where the school leaving age is 18. In Ontario, if a 17-year-old student's birth date falls between end of the school year to 31 December, they may withdraw from the school at the end of that current school year.
-3	Chile	18	15	2005	Students finish their secondary education (Educación Media in Spanish) at age 18, and working is legal only if the underaged employee (age 17 or younger) is authorised by legal guardian or parents,
-1	Colombia	15	14	2005	
-1	Costa Rica	17 or 18	15	2010	
0	Cuba	16		2010	
-4	Dominica	16	12	2004?	
0	Dominican Republic	18		2007?	
0	Grenada	14		2009	
0	Guyana	15	15	2003	
	Haiti	?	15	2002	
-2	Jamaica	14	12	2003	
0	Mexico	15		2014	
0	Paraguay	14	14	2009	Since the initiation of the Education Reform in 1993, basic education is for a period of nine years to the age of 15. According to the Constitution, compulsory education ends at 12.
2	Peru	16	18	2009	Employers are obliged to report regularly on the performance and attendance of students who they employ to help ensuring their education does suffer because of their employment.
0	Saint Kitts and Nevis	16		1997	
	Saint Vincent and the Grenadines	?	14?	2001	
	Suriname	10?	14	2005	
0	Trinidad and Tobago	16		2004	
	United States	16–18; varies by jurisdiction	12–21; varies by jurisdiction and industry	2010	The school-leaving age varies by state. Forty states have a school-leaving age of 16 or 18 and ten states have a school leaving age of 17. (Note: Not accounting for exceptions (such as graduating early), twenty states have a school-leaving age of 16: Alaska, Arizona (or upon completion of the 10th grade), Delaware, Florida, Georgia, Idaho, Indiana, Iowa, Massachusetts, Michigan, Minnesota, Missouri, Montana, New Jersey, New York, North Carolina, North Dakota, Rhode Island, Vermont (or upon completion of the 10th grade), and Wyoming. 10 states have a school-leaving age of 17: Alabama, Arkansas, Colorado, Illinois, Maine, Mississippi, Pennsylvania, South Carolina, Tennessee, and West Virginia. Twenty states have a school-leaving age of 18: California, Connecticut, the District of Columbia, Hawaii, Kansas, Louisiana, Nebraska, Nevada, Maryland, New Hampshire, New Mexico, Ohio, Oklahoma, Oregon, South Dakota, Texas, Utah, Virginia, Washington, and Wisconsin. In Kentucky, it is either 16 or 18 depending on each school district.) Under the Fair Labor Standards Act, the federal minimum employment age is 14; minors aged 14–15 have restricted hours, minors aged 16–17 have no restricted hours if working in non-hazardous occupations, and those aged 18 or older have no restrictions. Each state also sets a minimum employment age and range from 12–18 depending on age, graduation from high school, time of year, permission from parents or guardians, and occupation. Some occupations require one be aged 21 or older, including in some states serving alcohol.
1	Uruguay	14	15	2006	
0	Venezuela	14		2007	

=== Asia ===
Age gap	Country	De jure		Year	Notes
Age gap	Country	School leaving age	Employment age	Year	Notes
2	Afghanistan	13	15	2010	
	Armenia	?	14	2011	
	Azerbaijan	?	15	2005	
-1	Bahrain	15	14	2010	
4	Bangladesh	10	14	2008	
-3	Brunei	17	14	2003	Compulsory education in Brunei from primary education to secondary education. Tertiary education is encouraged.
	Myanmar	9	13	2011	De facto none
	Cambodia	?	15	2010	
1	People's Republic of China	15	16	2012	Compulsory education lasts 9 years. School-leaving age is calculated under the assumption that pupils will enroll in school at age 6 and graduate high school at age 18.
2	Georgia	14	16	2007	
0	India	14		2003	The Government is making a law of compulsory education up to 14 years. Any person who wishes to continue their education can continue to work.
0	Hong Kong, China	15	15	2019	Children aged under 15 are prohibited from working in all industrial undertakings. Children aged 13 and 14 may be employed in non-industrial establishments, subject to the condition that they attend full-time schooling if they have not yet completed Form III of secondary education and to other conditions which aim at protecting their safety, health and welfare.
-2	Indonesia	15		2018	The school leaving age varies among provinces with most having a leaving age of 15, but a handful having a leaving age of 18. Children aged under 15 are prohibited from working in all industrial undertakings.
0	Iran	15		2015	Compulsory education lasts 9 years, including primary and lower secondary education. School-leaving age is calculated under the assumption that pupils will enroll in primary education at age 6 and graduate lower secondary education at age 15.
	Iraq	?	15	1996	
-4	Israel	16	14	2011?	The age of employment has been lowered, the school leaving age raised.
0	Japan	15		2009	The vast majority (>90%) of Japanese students complete senior secondary education due to social pressures, despite the leaving age.
0	Jordan	16		2006	
1	Lebanon	12	13	2005	
-3	Mongolia	17	14	2009	
	Nepal	?	14	2004	
0	North Korea	16		2008	
0	South Korea	15		2011	The vast majority of Korean students complete senior secondary education due to social pressures as well as self-satisfaction, despite the leaving age. Government assistance is available to families.
-1	Kuwait	15	14	2012	
-3	Malaysia	16	13	2025	Preschool is mandatory and begins at age 5, lasting for one year. After that, children attend primary school from ages 6 to 11, followed by high school from ages 12 to 16. 16 is the school leaving age; one may leave only after the release of Sijil Pelajaran Malaysia results for admission to tertiary education. 13 is the minimum employment age. Individuals under the age of 15 are only allowed to perform light work that matches their abilities and must not exceed 6 hours per day. Those under 18 may work up to 7 hours per day, but only under the supervision of a guardian or a job supervisor. Under-aged people are not allowed to be employed or they risk fines by the Ministry of Human Resources.
	Maldives	?	14	2006	
4	Pakistan	10	14	2009?	Although the minimum age for leaving school is 10 years or primary, which means a 7-year education, the minimum age of employment is considered to be 14. The 14 years old can do only light work and not hazardous employment.
-3	Philippines	18	15	2015	The implementation of the K-12 program (see Education in the Philippines) also signaled the rise of the school leaving age to 18.
0	Saudi Arabia	15		2010?	A student may leave school after the age of 15 if permission of their father is given. Otherwise, the student must complete school until the age of 18. The employment age in a part-time job or during school holidays is 15.
-1	Singapore	16	15	2010?	Primary school is compulsory, followed by the secondary school. 16 is the school leaving age; one may leave only after the release of Singaporean GCE 'O' Level results for admission to polytechnics, junior colleges, Institute of Technical Education, or work. 15 is the minimum employment age. Under-aged people are not allowed to be employed or they risk fines by the Ministry of Manpower.
0	Sri Lanka	16		2014	For further information http://www.moe.gov.lk/sinhala/images/publications/Education_First_SL/Education_First_SL.pdf
0	Syria	15		2010	
0	Taiwan	15		2010	Compulsory education is up to Grade 9.Grades 10-12(senior high) is considered a form of basic education, but is not mandatory.
-2	Tajikistan	16	14	2009	
0	Thailand	15		2011	Students must complete secondary education up to Matthayom 3 and then have the choice of proceeding to upper secondary, vocational schools or dropping out, however, due to social pressures most students finish their secondary education and proceed to Matthayom 6, matriculation or other forms of pre-university education.
	Turkey	14-16?	16?	????	
3	United Arab Emirates	18	21	2001	
-2	Uzbekistan	18	16	2012	
-3	Vietnam	18	15	2011?	Junior high schools are now compulsory, but in some mountainous regions, many children leave schools earlier to help their parents. The government is trying to reduce that happening. Children must be at least 15 to be legally employed.
-1	Yemen	15	14	2004	Basic education lasts 9 years and is compulsory for ages 6–15. School-leaving age is calculated under the assumption that pupils will enroll in basic education at age 6 and graduate at age 15.

=== Europe ===
Age gap	Country	De jure		Year	Notes
Age gap	Country	School leaving age	Employment age	Year	Notes
0	Andorra	16		2001	
0	Austria	15		2011	
-2	Belarus	15	14	2010	
-2	Belgium	18	16	2021	Full-time education is compulsory from the age of 5 until the age of 16. After the age of 16 students can follow part-time or full-time education. At this age students can start working in their spare time, with specific labour laws in place. Belgium has three distinct schooling systems: one for the Flemish Community, one for the German Community, and one for the French Community.
	Bosnia and Herzegovina	?	15	2011	
0	Bulgaria	16		2007	
0	Croatia	15		2003	
0	Cyprus	15		2011	
-1	Czech Republic	16	15	2012	
-3	Denmark	16	13	2010	
0	Estonia	15		2002	
-1	Finland	16	15	2010	Citizens must complete comprehensive school. The age of finishing it varies depending on the age of starting school (mostly 7) and years held back. Most graduate from comprehensive school at the age of 16. Pupils who have not finished comprehensive school by the age of 17 (which is marginal) may quit school. Post-secondary (tertiary) education is voluntary.
0	France	16		2010	The statutory minimum school leaving age is 16. There are, however, a few specific cases where young people may enter employment before the age of 16, such as employment in the parents' company, sporadic work, or young people who have left school early taking up an apprenticeship at 15, to name a few.
-3	Germany	16-18	(15)	2003	In Germany, the age at which students finish school depends on the type of school they attend. With the school-leaving age being set at 16 in most schools, bar Gymnasium where students graduate instead at age 18. The federal Jugendarbeitsschutzgesetz (Youth Employment Protection Act) regulates the minimum employment age, which is set at 15.
0	Greece	15		2011	
0	Hungary	16		2019	A student aged 15 can work during school holidays, with parental permission. Between 16 and 18 a minor can work during the school year too, but only with parental permission. Minors can not work more than 40 hours a week, and they can work only between 6 a.m. and 10 p.m., with no night shifts.
0	Iceland	16		2010	
-2	Ireland	16	(14)	2000	The statutory minimum age is 16, except for those who have completed less than three years of secondary education, for whom it is 18. The minimum working ages are: 14 during school holidays; 15 during term time; 16 for working up to 40 hours per week and 8 hours per day; 18 for working with no age-based restrictions. Employees under 18 must be registered. Exemptions may be specified by the Minister for Enterprise, Tourism and Employment; this has been done for close relatives.
-2-0	Italy	16-18	16	2010	Full-time education is compulsory from the age of 6 to 16. From the person's 16th to their 18th birthday, they can either choose to continue full-time school or start an apprenticeship while still going to school for at least one week a month.
0	Latvia	15		2005	
0	Liechtenstein	15		2005	
0	Lithuania	16		2011	
0	Luxembourg	16		1997	
-4.5	Republic of Macedonia	19.5	15	2009?	Compulsory secondary education starts the year 2008 (Official Gazette of the Republic of Macedonia No. 49 from 18 April 2007).
0	Malta	16		2012	Although the compulsory education ends at 16, an increasing number of children opt to further their studies while taking up part-time employment.
-1	Moldova	16	15	2008	
0	Monaco	16		2012	
0	Montenegro	15		2010	
-5	Netherlands	16	13	2014	In the Netherlands, school attendance is compulsory for all children aged from 5 to 16. Young people aged from 16 to 18 have to get a basic qualification before leaving school.
-3	Netherlands Antilles	15	12	2010?	
-1	Norway	16	15	2009	
-3-1	Poland	14-18*	15	2002	After graduating from an 8-year primary school (usually at the age of 14 or 15) one can leave school but is legally required to continue education up to the age of 18. However, this requirement can be satisfied through vocational training, without attending a school. This can be done as a part of employment, so technically the person leaves a school and works full-time.
-2	Portugal	18	16	2009	
-1	Romania	18	16	2025	
0	Russia	15		2004	
0	San Marino	16		2003	
1	Serbia	14	15	2007	
-2	Slovakia	16	(14)	2006?	From 14 to 17, only part-time jobs allowed. Student can leave school after 10 years of school attendance (usually 16 years) or when first school year after his/her 16th birthday is finished (whatever comes first). Most students continue until maturita exam in last year of high school (student is usually 19 at that time).
0	Slovenia	15		2012	
0	Spain	16		1997	
0	Sweden	16		2004	
0	Switzerland	15		2001	
-1	Ukraine	17	16	2010	
United Kingdom
-1	England	16	15	2015	The full legal working age in England corresponds with the end of formal education, which is mandatory from the first September after a child turns 5, to the last Friday of June in Year 11 (when an individual is aged either 15-16). Full-time employment is illegal before this point, although part-time employment may be undertaken from 14 and in certain cases, for example delivering newspapers, at 13. The Education and Skills Act 2008 (which began being implemented in England in 2013) maintains the school-leaving age in England at 16, but requires that individuals above the school-leaving age (whom are aged between 16-18) either be working full-time or enrolled in a higher education institution (with higher education options open to those aged 16 and above including further education colleges or sixth forms, universities from the age of 17). This provision (as stipulated) applies solely to England and there is no legal requirement for an individual to be either working or remain enrolled in educational facility, above the age of 16, in any other UK nation.
-1	Northern Ireland	16	(15)	2014	
-3	Scotland	16	(13)	2013	Compulsory education ends after the age of 16. Restrictions apply to working hours of those aged 13 to 15 (i.e. maximum hours, work permits, type of work) to ensure that employment fits around requirements of full-time education.
-2	Wales	16	(14)	2013	Full-time work starts at 16.

=== Oceania ===
Age gap	Country	De jure		Year	Notes
Age gap	Country	School leaving age	Employment age	Year	Notes
	Australia	15 or 17	11 for supervised work, 13 for easy work, 15 for most jobs	2011	The minimum ages from 2009 will be the following: Northern Territory – 15; ACT – 15; South Australia – 17; Queensland – 17; Students must remain in school until they turn 16 years of age or complete Year 10, whichever comes first. From there they must be "learning or earning" which means they must be employed at least 25 hours a week, or be in full-time education or be in a combination of both part-time employment and part-time education which adds up to at least 25 hours a week until they turn 17 or complete Year 12 or equivalent, which ever comes first. Victoria – 17; Western Australia – 15; NSW – 17 (if they want to not do their HSC they need to be working at least 25 hours per week or at TAFE studying until they turn 17); Tasmania – 17.
	Fiji	?	18	1996	
4	Marshall Islands	14	18	2005	
	Federated States of Micronesia	14	?	1996	
0	New Zealand	16		2010	Those at least 15 may leave school with permission from the Ministry of Education.
	Papua New Guinea	?		2003	
	Palau	17	?	2000	
	Solomon Islands	?	12	2002	

== School retention by country ==
Country	2009 OECD	1986 Michael Hill	
Country	%-age in full-time education (aged 15–19)	%-age in full-time education (aged 17)	Minimum leaving age required
Australia	78	50	15
Austria	84	^{N}/_{A}	^{N}/_{A}
Belgium	91	86	16
Brazil	70	^{N}/_{A}	^{N}/_{A}
Canada	80	79	15/16
Czech Republic	93	^{N}/_{A}	^{N}/_{A}
Denmark	89	75	16/17
Estonia	89	^{N}/_{A}	^{N}/_{A}
Finland	90	91	17
France	90	80	16
Germany	93	100	16
Greece	88	55	14.5
Hungary	93	^{N}/_{A}	^{N}/_{A}
Iceland	88	41	15
Ireland	83	^{N}/_{A}	^{N}/_{A}
Israel	69	^{N}/_{A}	^{N}/_{A}
Italy	84	46	14
Japan		91	15
Luxembourg	95	^{N}/_{A}	^{N}/_{A}
Mexico	61	^{N}/_{A}	^{N}/_{A}
Netherlands	90	87	16
New Zealand	73	54	15
Norway	81	76	16
OECD average	84	^{N}/_{A}	^{N}/_{A}
Poland	94	^{N}/_{A}	^{N}/_{A}
Portugal	85	^{N}/_{A}	^{N}/_{A}
Slovakia	91	^{N}/_{A}	^{N}/_{A}
Slovenia	94	^{N}/_{A}	^{N}/_{A}
Spain	80	53	14
Sweden	88	86	16
Switzerland	85	83	15/16
Turkey	56	^{N}/_{A}	^{N}/_{A}
United Kingdom	78	49	16
United States	85	89	17

== See also ==
- Compulsory education
- Education Index
- Legal working age
- Raising of school leaving age
