= Raising of school leaving age =

Change in education policy

The raising of school leaving age (ROSLA) is an act brought into force when the legal age a child is allowed to leave compulsory education increases. In most countries, the school leaving age reflects when young people are seen to be mature enough within their society, but not necessarily when they are old enough to be regarded as an adult.

There are several reasons why a government may wish to raise the school leaving age. It may be due to a lack of skilled labour in the country, or it may simply be a way of reducing a country's unemployment figures.

== Americas ==
=== Brazil ===
In Brazil, the current school leaving age is 18.

=== Canada ===
In Canada, the age in which children are required to attend schools is determined by the provinces. Currently, enrollment in education is compulsory up to the age of 16 in all provinces and territories of Canada, barring Manitoba, New Brunswick and Ontario, in which the school-leaving age is 18 unless the student graduates secondary education at an earlier age. In some provinces, early leaving exemptions can be granted under certain circumstances under the age of 16.

=== United States ===
In the United States, as of January 2014, 28 states, Washington, D.C., American Samoa, and Puerto Rico require students to attend school until they are 18 or until they graduate high school. In two of these states, the requirement went into effect in July 2017. There are 10 states that require school attendance until age 17, while 15 states and the Virgin Islands only require schooling until age 16, but one state require students to attend school until age 19 or graduation. Those states which have raised their minimum dropout ages above 16 may provide for exceptions with parental consent at ages 16 or 17. Further, most states have clauses allowing for graduation by students who manage to complete all academic requirements early.

==== States and territories with a minimum dropout age of 19 ====
- Texas

==== States and territories with a minimum dropout age of 18 ====
- American Samoa
- Arkansas
- California
- Connecticut
- Hawaii
- Idaho
- Indiana
- Kansas
- Kentucky
- Louisiana
- Maryland
- Michigan
- Nebraska
- Nevada
- New Hampshire
- New Mexico
- Ohio
- Oklahoma
- Oregon
- Puerto Rico
- Rhode Island
- South Dakota
- Tennessee
- Utah
- Virginia
- Washington
- Washington, D.C.
- Wisconsin

==== States and territories with a minimum dropout age of 17 ====
- Alabama
- Colorado
- Illinois
- Maine
- Minnesota
- Mississippi
- Missouri
- Pennsylvania
- South Carolina
- West Virginia

==== States and territories with a minimum dropout age of 16 ====
- Alaska
- Arizona
- Delaware
- Florida
- Georgia
- Iowa
- Massachusetts
- Montana
- New Jersey
- New York
- North Carolina
- North Dakota
- Vermont
- Virgin Islands
- Wyoming

== Asia ==
=== Israel ===
The school leaving age was raised from 16 to 18 following a law change on 17 July 2007. The change will be implemented within three years of the law being passed. In the 2005-6 school year 5.6% of students left school before the age of 18, mostly at age 16; the dropout rate was highest amongst Bedouin (9.8%) and lowest amongst Jewish students (4.7%).

== Europe ==
=== Belgium ===
The school leaving age in Belgium is set at 18.

=== France ===
The statutory minimum school leaving age in France is 16. There are, however, a few specific cases where young people may enter employment before the age of 16, such as employment in their parents’ company, sporadic work or taking up an apprenticeship at 14, to name a few. The apprenticeship option is becoming increasingly popular.

=== Germany ===
The school leaving age in Germany varies depending on the school type. With a school leaving age set at 16 for most forms of education, including Berufsschule and Hauptschule.

Those attending a Gymnasium study for their Abitur can finish at a later age of 18 however, (as opposed to most other schools where an individual finishes at age 16).

=== Ireland ===
Although the national schools provided free primary education in Ireland from the 1830s, the Powis Commission of 1868-70 recognised a problem of low school attendance. The Education (Ireland) Act 1892 made attendance compulsory from ages 6 to 14 in urban districts, extended to rural districts by the Local Government (Ireland) Act 1898. However, there were many exemptions and enforcement was patchy. The Killanin Committee of 1918–19 documented the flaws in the system. The School Attendance Act, 1926 established a harder minimum of 14 years, controversially retaining a temporary exemption in spring and autumn for children over 12 working on the family farm. This exemption was extended in 1936 and expired in 1940. The 1926 Act also empowered the Minister for Education to raise the school leaving age to 15 or 16 for some or all children; though debated from the 1940s on, this was not invoked until 1972, to raise the age to 15. The Education (Welfare) Act, 2000 raised the age to the current minimum of 16 years, and prohibits under-18s from leaving school until they have completed three years of secondary education (i.e. up to Junior Certificate).

=== Italy ===
Until 2007 in Italy, students could leave school once they reached the age of 14. The compulsory school leaving age was raised to 16 years to bring the country into line with the rest of the EU.

=== Netherlands ===
In the Netherlands, school attendance is compulsory for all children aged from 5 to 16. Young people aged from 16 to 18 have to get a basic qualification before leaving school.

=== Poland ===
The most recent occurrence of the school leaving age being raised in Poland was in 1999. The Polish government overhauled the country's education system, resulting in school attendance being made compulsory up to the age of 18, though there are some non-school alternatives including apprenticeships.

=== Spain ===
In Spain, compulsory education is enforced from the age of 6, with their school leaving age set at 16.

=== United Kingdom ===
==== England and Wales ====
The current school leaving age in England is set at 16, with an additional provision requiring persons (aged 16-17), to either be in full-time (or part-time) work, or enrolled in college, or another form of post-16 education.

In Wales, the current school leaving age is set at 16, without additional provisions.

The school leaving age in the UK, particularly in England and Wales, has been raised numerous times. The first act to introduce and enforce compulsory attendance was the Elementary Education Act 1870 (33 & 34 Vict. c. 75), with school boards set up to ensure children attended school, although exemptions were made for illness and travelling distance. Since then, the age has been raised several times, most notably to 15 through the Education Act 1944 and to 16 by the Raising of the School Leaving Age Order 1972 (SI 1972/444), along with the addition of so called "ROSLA Buildings" built as part of a school expansion scheme to cope with the extra number of students and Middle schools, the latter serving the 8-12 or 9-13 age ranges, though many have since been abolished.

In England, the additional provisions requiring those aged above 16, to either be working, in a job or as an apprentice, or enrolled in further post-16 education, such as a college, took effect in-part from September 2014, and in-full from September 2015. These changes (made under the Education and Skills Act 2008) do not apply to Wales, or any other UK nation.

==== Scotland ====
In Scotland, the leaving age was raised to 16 by the Raising of the School Leaving Age (Scotland) Regulations 1972 (SI 1972/59). John D. Pollock, then a member of the Educational Institute of Scotland, commented in 1973 that the age raise led to "increased violence and delinquency in schools". However, in a special inquiry by the Evening Times the following year, it was found that the majority of students said raising the age had been a success, as ambitions had been raised in their final year, leading to a greater number going in to meaningful employment or apprenticeships rather than unskilled labour. In contrast, school teachers had a different view, particularly due to the increased workload and number of students they now had to accommodate. In one instance, a headteacher visited a class of 16 year olds to find them playing cards "or just kicking their heels with boredom". Other reports suggested the leaving age raise was a "cheat" for many young people, as expectations had been built up without being able to "supply the goods", often leading children to be "fobbed off with diverting".

==== Northern Ireland ====
School Age Act (Northern Ireland) 2022
- Act of the Northern Ireland Assembly
- Northern Ireland Assembly
- Long title: An Act to amend the meaning of "compulsory school age" in the Education Orders; and for connected purposes.
- Citation: 2022 c. 21 (N.I.)

Dates
- Royal assent: 27 April 2022

Status: Current legislation

Text of statute as originally enacted

Text of the School Age Act (Northern Ireland) 2022 as in force today (including any amendments) within the United Kingdom, from legislation.gov.uk.

In Northern Ireland, the school leaving age was raised from 16 to 17 for some children by the School Age Act (Northern Ireland) 2022 (c. 21 (N.I.)).

== Oceania ==
=== Australia ===
The age at which a child can leave compulsory education in the state of New South Wales was raised to 16 in May 2009, and to 17 in January 2010. The Education Minister Carmel Tebbutt stated "all the research shows that if students either get their Higher School Certificate or an equivalent vocational qualification, then their employment opportunities in later life are far greater and so is their income-earning capacity."

The state of South Australia also suggested similar proposals in March 2006, saying that their school leaving age should be raised from 16 to 17 by 2008. Independent state MP Bob Such suggests that it may not happen for at least another four years, whilst in the meantime, too many children are leaving school without any qualifications. The age was raised by law on 1 January 2009 to 17 or 16 if the person is working or training.

Tasmania has for decades had their school leaving age set at 15, with a requirement to be participating in education or training until age 16 enacted as of 2007 according to the Department of Education.

The Western Australian government is pushing the minimum school leaving age up from 15 in 2006 to 16 in January 2007 and to 17 in January 2008. As of 2013 the age was raised to 17 and 6 months.

Victoria changed their school leaving age from 15 to 16 in 2006. Since 2010, it is 17.

The minimum ages for leaving school (but not necessarily education) are currently the following:

- Northern Territory – 17
- Australian Capital Territory – 17
- South Australia – 16
- Queensland – 16
- Victoria – 17
- Western Australia – 17.5
- New South Wales – 17
- Tasmania – 17

Some states such as ACT allow for students to leave conventional schooling at an earlier age, after completion of Year 10, if going into full-time employment, obtaining an apprenticeship or completing a tertiary education course at approved institutions.

=== New Zealand ===
In New Zealand, the school leaving age is 16.
