= Autism Act (Northern Ireland) 2011 =

Act of the Northern Ireland Assembly

- Act of the Northern Ireland Assembly
- Northern Ireland Assembly
- Long title: An Act to amend the Disability Discrimination Act 1995 and to require an autism strategy to be prepared.
- Citation: 2011 c. 27 (N.I.)
- Introduced by: Dominic Bradley
- Territorial extent: Northern Ireland

Dates
- Royal assent: 9 May 2011
- Commencement: 9 August 2011

Other legislation
- Amended by: Autism (Amendment) Act (Northern Ireland) 2022

Status: Current legislation

History of passage through the Assembly

Text of statute as originally enacted

Text of the Autism Act (Northern Ireland) 2011 as in force today (including any amendments) within the United Kingdom, from legislation.gov.uk.

The Autism Act (Northern Ireland) 2011 (c. 27 (N.I.)) is an act of the Northern Ireland Assembly. The act makes provision about the needs of adults and children who have autistic spectrum disorders including autism and Asperger syndrome.

== Background ==
In 2002, the Department of Education published guidance for teachers regarding autistic spectrum disorders, and an evaluation of the provision of services for autistic children in Northern Ireland.

In 2007, the Northern Ireland Statistics and Research Agency published a review of early intervention provision for autism. It recommended a joint strategy, comprehensive assessment procedure with a waiting time of no more than 4 months, intervention that takes into account the needs of individual families, and more thorough training.

== Duties ==
=== Autism strategy publication ===
The act requires the publication of an autism strategy document.

Several iterations of the strategy have been published.

=== Independent reviewer ===
The act requires the appointment of an independent autism reviewer.

=== Health and Social Care trusts ===
The act requires the Health and Social Care trusts to provide data on the prevalence of autism in their areas.

== Provisions ==
Section 5 provides that the act came into force at the end of the period of three months that began on the date on which it was passed.

== Reception ==
AutismNI has hailed the original act as "the most comprehensive and progressive legislation for autism across the UK and Ireland" and that with the amendments, the legislation has been "strengthened even more"

== Amendment ==
Autism (Amendment) Act (Northern Ireland) 2022
- Act of the Northern Ireland Assembly
- Northern Ireland Assembly
- Long title: An Act to amend the Autism Act (Northern Ireland) 2011.
- Citation: 2022 c. 13 (N.I.)

Dates
- Royal assent: 26 April 2022
- Commencement: 27 July 2022

Text of statute as originally enacted

Text of the Autism (Amendment) Act (Northern Ireland) 2022 as in force today (including any amendments) within the United Kingdom, from legislation.gov.uk.

In 2022, the Northern Ireland Assembly passed a private member's bill to further strengthen provision of services and to ensure that services are "person-centred". The Autism (Amendment) Act (Northern Ireland) 2022 (c. 13 (N.I.)) passed unanimously.

The amended act requires the Department of Health to publish details of funding.

The amended act requires the data published by the Department of Health to be separated into adults and children.

== See also ==
- Autism Act 2009
- Middletown Centre for Autism
