= List of acts of the Northern Ireland Assembly from 2024 =

This is a list of acts of the Northern Ireland Assembly passed in 2024. Acts of the Northern Ireland Assembly are enacted by the Northern Ireland Assembly, which has legislative authority over devolved matters in relation to Northern Ireland under the authority of the Northern Ireland Act 1998. Acts are cited by calendar year, in the same fashion as acts of Parliament of the United Kingdom. Each act passed in a respective year is given a chapter number (abbreviated "c.") denoted by Arabic numerals, and citations are usually followed by the suffix "(N.I.)" so as to prevent confusion with acts of Parliament of the United Kingdom.

4 acts of the Northern Ireland Assembly were passed in 2024.

indicates that an act has been transcribed on Wikisource, indicates that an act is available to view at legislation.gov.uk, and indicates the location of the original act in the Parliamentary Archives.

== Acts of the Northern Ireland Assembly ==
Short title	Citation	Royal assent
Long title
Budget Act (Northern Ireland) 2024	2024 c. 1 (N.I.)	4 March 2024
An Act to authorise the use for the public service of certain resources for the years ending 31 March 2024 and 2025 (including, for the year ending 31 March 2024, income); to authorise the issue out of the Consolidated Fund of certain sums for the service of those years; to authorise the use of those sums for specified purposes; and to authorise the Department of Finance to borrow on the credit of those sums.
Hospital Parking Charges Act (Northern Ireland) 2024	2024 c. 2 (N.I.)	16 May 2024
An Act to modify the operation of the Hospital Parking Charges Act (Northern Ireland) 2022 (Note: Hospital Parking Charges Act (Northern Ireland) 2022 (c. 24 (N.I.))) so as to postpone the ban on charging money for parking vehicles in hospital car parks.
Defective Premises Act (Northern Ireland) 2024	2024 c. 3 (N.I.)	20 September 2024
An Act to amend the law as to liability for defects in the state of dwellings; and for connected purposes.
Budget (No. 2) Act (Northern Ireland) 2024	2024 c. 4 (N.I.)	18 October 2024
An Act to authorise the use for the public service of certain resources for the year ending 31 March 2025 (including income); to authorise the issue out of the Consolidated Fund of certain sums for the service of that year; to authorise the use of those sums for specified purposes; to authorise the Department of Finance to borrow on the credit of those sums; to authorise the use for the public service of excess resources for the years ending 31 March 2021, 2022 and 2023; to authorise the issue out of the Consolidated Fund of certain excess sums for the service of the years ending 31 March 2017 and 2019; and to authorise the use of those sums for specified purposes.
