= List of acts of the Northern Ireland Assembly from 2022 =

This is a list of acts of the Northern Ireland Assembly passed in 2022. Acts of the Northern Ireland Assembly are enacted by the Northern Ireland Assembly, which has legislative authority over devolved matters in relation to Northern Ireland under the authority of the Northern Ireland Act 1998. Acts are cited by calendar year, in the same fashion as acts of Parliament of the United Kingdom. Each act passed in a respective year is given a chapter number (abbreviated "c.") denoted by Arabic numerals, and citations are usually followed by the suffix "(N.I.)" so as to prevent confusion with acts of Parliament of the United Kingdom.

31 acts of the Northern Ireland Assembly were passed in 2022.

indicates that an act has been transcribed on Wikisource, indicates that an act is available to view at legislation.gov.uk, and indicates the location of the original act in the Parliamentary Archives.

== Acts of the Northern Ireland Assembly ==
Short title	Citation	Royal assent
Long title
Damages (Return on Investment) Act (Northern Ireland) 2022	2022 c. 1 (N.I.)	2 February 2022
An Act to make provision in relation to the assumed rate of return on investment of particular damages awarded in personal injury cases.
Horse Racing (Amendment) Act (Northern Ireland) 2022	2022 c. 2 (N.I.)	2 February 2022
An Act to amend the Horse Racing (Northern Ireland) Order 1990 (Note: Horse Racing (Northern Ireland) Order 1990 (SI 1990/1508)) to allow for payments to be made from the Horse Racing Fund to horse racecourse operators; and for connected purposes.
Health and Social Care Act (Northern Ireland) 2022	2022 c. 3 (N.I.)	2 February 2022
An Act to dissolve the Regional Health and Social Care Board; to make provision for and in connection with the exercise by the Department of Health and Health and Social Care trusts of the functions of the Board; and for connected purposes.
Criminal Justice (Committal Reform) Act (Northern Ireland) 2022	2022 c. 4 (N.I.)	7 March 2022
An Act to amend the law relating to committal for trial.
Parental Bereavement (Leave and Pay) Act (Northern Ireland) 2022	2022 c. 5 (N.I.)	21 March 2022
An Act to make provision about leave and pay for employees whose children have died or who have experienced a miscarriage.
Budget Act (Northern Ireland) 2022	2022 c. 6 (N.I.)	24 March 2022
An Act to authorise the issue out of the Consolidated Fund of certain sums for the service of the years ending 31 March 2022 and 2023; to appropriate those sums for specified purposes; to authorise the use for the public service of certain resources for those years; to revise the limits on the use of certain accruing resources in the year ending 31 March 2022; and to authorise the Department of Finance to borrow on the credit of the sum appropriated for the year ending 31 March 2023.
Social Security (Terminal Illness) Act (Northern Ireland) 2022	2022 c. 7 (N.I.)	30 March 2022
An Act to provide that special social security rules which apply where life expectancy is 6 months or less are instead to apply where life expectancy is 12 months or less.
Financial Reporting (Departments and Public Bodies) Act (Northern Ireland) 2022	2022 c. 8 (N.I.)	30 March 2022
An Act to amend the law relating to the preparation of estimates and accounts of departments and certain non-departmental public bodies; and for connected purposes.
Animal Welfare (Service Animals) Act (Northern Ireland) 2022	2022 c. 9 (N.I.)	30 March 2022
An Act to amend the Welfare of Animals Act (Northern Ireland) 2011 (Note: Welfare of Animals Act (Northern Ireland) 2011 (c. 16 (N.I.))) in relation to service animals.
Organ and Tissue Donation (Deemed Consent) Act (Northern Ireland) 2022	2022 c. 10 (N.I.)	30 March 2022
An Act to amend the Human Tissue Act 2004 (Note: Human Tissue Act 2004 (c. 30)) concerning consent to activities done for the purpose of transplantation and make consequential amendments about the provision of information about such consent.
Charities Act (Northern Ireland) 2022	2022 c. 11 (N.I.)	30 March 2022
An Act to make provision about the lawfulness of decisions taken or other things done by staff of the Charity Commission for Northern Ireland, and about exempting charities, by reference to conditions related to thresholds, from the duty to be registered in the register of charities.
Non-domestic Rates Valuations (Coronavirus) Act (Northern Ireland) 2022	2022 c. 12 (N.I.)	30 March 2022
An Act to vary the application of Article 39A of the Rates (Northern Ireland) Order 1977 (Note: Rates (Northern Ireland) Order 1977 (SI 1977/2157)) in consequence of matters attributable to coronavirus; and to confer power to make equivalent provision for other infections or contaminations.
Autism (Amendment) Act (Northern Ireland) 2022	2022 c. 13 (N.I.)	26 April 2022
An Act to amend the Autism Act (Northern Ireland) 2011. (Note: Autism Act (Northern Ireland) 2011 (c. 27 (N.I.)))
Betting, Gaming, Lotteries and Amusements (Amendment) Act (Northern Ireland) 2022	2022 c. 14 (N.I.)	26 April 2022
An Act to amend the Betting, Gaming, Lotteries and Amusements (Northern Ireland) Order 1985; (Note: Betting, Gaming, Lotteries and Amusements (Northern Ireland) Order 1985 (SI 1985/1204)) and for connected purposes.
Integrated Education Act (Northern Ireland) 2022	2022 c. 15 (N.I.)	26 April 2022
An Act to make provision about integrated education; and for connected purposes.
Motor Vehicles (Compulsory Insurance) Act (Northern Ireland) 2022	2022 c. 16 (N.I.)	26 April 2022
An Act to amend retained EU law relating to compulsory insurance for the use of motor vehicles; and for connected purposes.
Protection from Stalking Act (Northern Ireland) 2022	2022 c. 17 (N.I.)	26 April 2022
An Act to provide protection from stalking, and from threatening or abusive behaviour, and for related purposes..
Adoption and Children Act (Northern Ireland) 2022	2022 c. 18 (N.I.)	27 April 2022
An Act to restate and amend the law relating to adoption; to make further amendments of the law relating to children; and for connected purposes.
Justice (Sexual Offences and Trafficking Victims) Act (Northern Ireland) 2022	2022 c. 19 (N.I.)	27 April 2022
An Act to make provision about and in connection with sexual offences; regulate particular matters relating to cases of trafficking or exploitation; and amend certain rules of law and procedure for the purpose of protecting people from harm.
Private Tenancies Act (Northern Ireland) 2022	2022 c. 20 (N.I.)	27 April 2022
An Act to amend the law relating to private tenancies.
School Age Act (Northern Ireland) 2022	2022 c. 21 (N.I.)	27 April 2022
An Act to amend the meaning of "compulsory school age" in the Education Orders; and for connected purposes.
Welfare Supplementary Payments (Amendment) Act (Northern Ireland) 2022	2022 c. 22 (N.I.)	27 April 2022
An Act to remove the end date for qualifying for payments under Article 137A of the Welfare Reform (Northern Ireland) Order 2015; (Note: Welfare Reform (Northern Ireland) Order 2015 (SI 2015/2006)) and provide for monitoring of and reporting on arrangements for payments having effect by virtue of Article 137 and Article 137A of that Order.
Fair Employment (School Teachers) Act (Northern Ireland) 2022	2022 c. 23 (N.I.)	12 May 2022
An Act to remove the exception for school teachers from the Fair Employment and Treatment (Northern Ireland) Order 1998; and for connected purposes.
Hospital Parking Charges Act (Northern Ireland) 2022	2022 c. 24 (N.I.)	12 May 2022
An Act to prohibit the imposition of charges for parking vehicles in hospital car parks.
Period Products (Free Provision) Act (Northern Ireland) 2022	2022 c. 25 (N.I.)	12 May 2022
An Act to secure the provision throughout Northern Ireland of free period products; and for connected purposes.
Preservation of Documents (Historical Institutions) Act (Northern Ireland) 2022	2022 c. 26 (N.I.)	12 May 2022
An Act to make provision for the preservation of documents relating to certain institutions and residents of those institutions between 1922 and 1995, and to certain children of those residents.
Domestic Abuse (Safe Leave) Act (Northern Ireland) 2022	2022 c. 27 (N.I.)	12 May 2022
An Act to make provision for an entitlement to paid safe leave for victims of domestic abuse; and for connected purposes.
Support for Mortgage Interest etc (Security for Loans) Act (Northern Ireland) 2022	2022 c. 28 (N.I.)	6 June 2022
An Act to provide for loans under Article 13 of the Welfare Reform and Work (Northern Ireland) Order 2016 (Note: Welfare Reform and Work (Northern Ireland) Order 2016 (SI 2016/999)) to be charged on land and for the charges to be registrable in the Statutory Charges Register.
General Teaching Council (Directions) Act (Northern Ireland) 2022	2022 c. 29 (N.I.)	6 June 2022
An Act to empower the Department of Education to give binding directions to the General Teaching Council for Northern Ireland.
Defamation Act (Northern Ireland) 2022	2022 c. 30 (N.I.)	6 June 2022
An Act to amend the law of defamation.
Climate Change Act (Northern Ireland) 2022	2022 c. 31 (N.I.)	6 June 2022
An Act to set targets for the years 2050, 2040 and 2030 for the reduction of greenhouse gas emissions; to provide for a system of carbon budgeting; to provide for reporting and statements against those targets and budgets; to confer power to impose climate change reporting duties on public bodies; to provide for reports and advice from the Committee on Climate Change; and for connected purposes.
