= Opinion polling for the 2024 United Kingdom general election =

Opinion polling for the 2024 United Kingdom general election was carried out by various organisations to gauge voting intention. Most of the polling companies listed are members of the British Polling Council (BPC) and abide by its disclosure rules. The opinion polls listed range from the previous election on 12 December 2019 to the election on 4 July 2024.

== Graphical summaries ==
The Conservatives led the polls for the two years following the 2019 general election, which included Brexit, the onset of the COVID-19 pandemic and vaccine rollout during the leadership of Boris Johnson. Labour took a lead following the Partygate scandal and maintained this through the Liz Truss and Rishi Sunak premierships until the 2024 election.

== Guide to tables ==
Poll results are listed in the tables below in reverse chronological order. The highest percentage figure in each poll is displayed in bold, and its background is shaded in the leading party's colour. The "lead" column shows the percentage point difference between the two parties with the highest figures. When a poll result is a tie, the figures with the highest percentages are shaded and displayed in bold.

"Green" in these tables refers to combined totals for the green parties in the United Kingdom, namely the Green Party of England and Wales, the Scottish Greens, and, for polls of the entire UK, the Green Party Northern Ireland. The three parties share a commitment to environmental policies, but are independent of one another, with each contesting elections only in its own region.

The polling company ComRes was acquired by Savanta in July 2019. It was rebranded as Savanta ComRes in November 2019 and as Savanta in December 2022. In August 2023, the market research company Omnisis rebranded its public polling arm as We Think. In October 2023, the Norstat group acquired Panelbase. In November 2023, Kantar Public rebranded to Verian. None of these organisational changes entailed changes in methodology.

== National poll results ==
Most national opinion polls do not cover Northern Ireland, which has different major political parties from the rest of the United Kingdom. This distinction is made in the tables below in the area column, where "GB" means Great Britain (England, Scotland and Wales), and "UK" means the entire United Kingdom. Plaid Cymru only stand candidates in Wales and the Scottish National Party (SNP) only stand candidates in Scotland.

=== 2024 ===
When compared to the result, the final week of polls on average underestimated the Conservative and Liberal Democrat vote shares and overestimated the Labour and Reform vote shares. The projected SNP and Green vote shares were largely accurate.

Dates conducted	Pollster	Client	Area	Sample size	Con	Lab	LD	SNP	Grn	Ref	PC	Others	Lead
4 Jul 2024	2024 general election	–	UK	–	23.7%	33.7%	12.2%	2.5%	6.8%	14.3%	0.7%	6.1%	10.0
4 Jul 2024	2024 general election	–	GB	–	24.4%	34.7%	12.5%	2.5%	6.9%	14.7%	0.7%	3.7%	10.3
3 Jul	Number Cruncher Politics	N/A	GB	2,497	23%	41%	11%	2%	7%	13%	1%	2%	18
2–3 Jul	JL Partners	The Rest Is Politics	GB	2,005	23%	38%	13%	3%	5%	17%	0%	3%	15
2–3 Jul	Savanta	N/A	UK	2,101	20%	39%	10%	2%	5%	17%	–	7%	19
2–3 Jul	We Think	N/A	GB	1,210	23%	41%	11%	2%	7%	15%	–	2%	18
1–3 Jul	Survation	Good Morning Britain	GB	1,679	20%	38%	12%	3%	7%	17%	1%	2%	18
1–3 Jul	Norstat	N/A	GB	3,134	24%	37%	11%	4%	6%	16%	1%	1%	13
1–3 Jul	Opinium	N/A	GB	2,219	21%	41%	11%	2%	7%	17%	0%	1%	20
1–3 Jul	Ipsos	N/A	GB	2,076	19%	37%	11%	5%	9%	15%	1%	4%	18
29 Jun – 3 Jul	Deltapoll	N/A	GB	1,737	22%	39%	10%	2%	7%	17%	1%	2%	17
2 Jul	PeoplePolling	GB News	GB	1,260	16%	36%	10%	4%	9%	20%	–	5%	16
1–2 Jul	Whitestone Insight	Daily Express/Daily Mirror	GB	2,008	21%	38%	10%	3%	7%	18%	1%	2% Workers Party of Britain on 0% SDP on 0% Other on 2%	17
30 Jun – 2 Jul	BMG	The i	GB	1,854	22%	39%	11%	3%	7%	16%	0%	3%	17
28 Jun – 2 Jul	Techne	N/A	GB	5,503	21%	40%	11%	3%	6%	16%	–	3%	19
28 Jun – 2 Jul	Redfield & Wilton	N/A	GB	20,000	22%	41%	10%	3%	6%	16%	0%	2% Workers Party of Britain on 1% Alba Party on 0% Other on 1%	19
26 Jun – 2 Jul	Survation	Good Morning Britain	UK	1,022	18%	38%	11%	3%	7%	17%	0%	5%	20
19 Jun – 2 Jul	YouGov (MRP)	N/A	GB	47,751	22%	39%	12%	3%	7%	15%	1%	2%	17
28 Jun – 1 Jul	Verian	N/A	GB	2,135	21%	36%	13%	3%	7%	16%	1%	2%	15
28 Jun – 1 Jul	JL Partners	The Rest Is Politics	GB	2,028	24%	39%	10%	4%	5%	16%	1%	1%	15
27 Jun – 1 Jul	Lord Ashcroft	N/A	GB	5,183	19%	38%	11%	3%	8%	18%	–	3%	19
24 Jun – 1 Jul	More in Common (MRP)	The News Agents	GB	13,556	24%	40%	11%	2%	6%	14%	–	3%	16
15 Jun – 1 Jul	Survation (MRP)	N/A	GB	34,558	23%	42%	11%	2%	5%	11%	1%	3%	19
10 Jun – 1 Jul	Focaldata (MRP)	N/A	GB	36,726	23%	40%	12%	3%	5%	16%	1%	1%	19
28–30 Jun	Savanta	The Telegraph	UK	2,287	24%	39%	10%	3%	4%	13%	–	7%	17
28–30 Jun	More in Common	N/A	GB	4,525	24%	39%	12%	3%	5%	15%	0%	2%	15
27–29 Jun	Deltapoll	Mail on Sunday	GB	1,645	21%	42%	11%	3%	4%	16%	1%	2%	21
27–28 Jun	We Think	N/A	GB	1,210	20%	42%	10%	3%	7%	16%	–	2%	22
26–28 Jun	Savanta	The Telegraph	UK	2,092	21%	38%	11%	2%	6%	14%	–	7%	17
26–28 Jun	Opinium	The Observer	GB	1,503	20%	40%	13%	3%	6%	17%	1%	1%	20
26–28 Jun	More in Common	N/A	GB	3,361	24%	39%	13%	3%	5%	13%	1%	2%	15
26–27 Jun	Whitestone Insight	Daily Express/Daily Mirror	GB	2,012	18%	38%	11%	2%	7%	21%	1%	2% Workers Party of Britain on 0% SDP on 0% Other on 2%	17
26–27 Jun	Techne	N/A	GB	1,643	19%	41%	12%	3%	5%	17%	–	3%	22
26–27 Jun	Redfield & Wilton	N/A	GB	5,000	19%	42%	11%	3%	5%	18%	0%	2% Workers Party of Britain on 1% Alba Party on 0% Other on 1%	23
25–27 Jun	YouGov	N/A	GB	4,110	20%	37%	13%	3%	7%	17%	1%	3%	17
15–27 Jun	Survation (MRP)	N/A	GB	23,364	25%	42%	11%	2%	5%	11%	1%	3%	17
25–26 Jun	PeoplePolling	GB News	GB	1,932	15%	40%	9%	2%	9%	21%	0%	2%	19
24–26 Jun	BMG	The i	GB	1,522	20%	42%	12%	3%	6%	16%	–	2%	22
24–26 Jun	More in Common	The News Agents	GB	3,420	23%	40%	11%	3%	5%	14%	0%	3%	17
24–26 Jun	Norstat	N/A	GB	2,025	23%	39%	12%	4%	6%	15%	1%	1%	16
24–26 Jun	Deltapoll	The National	GB	2,077	20%	42%	11%	3%	4%	17%	0%	2%	22
24–25 Jun	YouGov	N/A	GB	1,572	18%	36%	15%	3%	8%	17%	1%	2%	18
21–25 Jun	Survation	Good Morning Britain	UK	1,022	18%	41%	12%	2%	5%	14%	0%	7%	23
7–25 Jun	JL Partners (SRP) (Note: Stacked regression with poststratification.)	The Sunday Times	GB	13,584	22%	38%	13%	3%	5%	17%	1%	1%	16
21–24 Jun	JL Partners	The Rest is Politics	GB	2,005	25%	41%	11%	3%	5%	15%	0%	1%	16
21–24 Jun	Deltapoll	N/A	GB	1,568	19%	43%	13%	2%	5%	15%	–	2%	24
21–24 Jun	Redfield & Wilton	N/A	GB	10,000	18%	42%	12%	3%	6%	19%	0%	2% Workers Party of Britain on 1% Alba Party on 0% Other on 1%	23
21–24 Jun	Savanta	The Telegraph	UK	2,318	21%	42%	10%	3%	5%	14%	–	6%	21
21–24 Jun	Ipsos	N/A	GB	1,402	19%	42%	11%	5%	7%	15%	0%	1%	23
21–24 Jun	Verian	N/A	GB	1,047	21%	38%	12%	3%	8%	16%	1%	1%	17
20–24 Jun	Lord Ashcroft	N/A	GB	5,134	19%	40%	10%	3%	9%	17%	0%	3%	25
14–24 Jun	FindOutNow/Electoral Calculus (MRP)	Daily Mirror and GB News	GB	19,993	15%	40%	14%	3%	7%	17%	1%	2%	23
30 May – 24 Jun	We Think (MRP)	N/A	GB	18,595	22%	42%	11%	3%	6%	14%	1%	2%	20
21–23 Jun	More in Common	N/A	GB	2,046	25%	41%	10%	2%	5%	15%	0%	2%	16
20–21 Jun	We Think	N/A	GB	1,270	22%	43%	8%	3%	7%	13%	1%	3%	21
19–21 Jun	Savanta	The Telegraph	UK	2,103	19%	42%	9%	3%	5%	16%	–	6%	23
19–21 Jun	Opinium	The Observer	GB	1,484	20%	40%	12%	3%	9%	16%	1%	1%	20
19–20 Jun	YouGov	The Times	GB	2,047	19%	37%	13%	3%	6%	18%	1%	2%	18
19–20 Jun	Whitestone Insight	Daily Express/Daily Mirror	GB	2,029	19%	39%	12%	3%	6%	20%	1%	1% SDP on 0% Workers Party of Britain on 0% Other on 1%	19
19–20 Jun	Techne	N/A	GB	1,642	19%	42%	12%	2%	5%	17%	–	3%	23
19–20 Jun	Redfield & Wilton	N/A	GB	2,500	18%	42%	11%	3%	5%	19%	0%	1% Workers Party of Britain on 0% Alba Party on 0% Other on 1%	23
4–20 Jun	Focaldata (MRP)	N/A	GB	24,536	23%	41%	11%	3%	5%	16%	0%	0%	18
18–19 Jun	BMG	The i	GB	1,627	19%	42%	9%	3%	7%	19%	–	1%	23
17–19 Jun	Norstat	N/A	GB	2,059	20%	40%	12%	3%	5%	19%	1%	1%	20
17–19 Jun	More in Common	N/A	GB	2,035	25%	39%	11%	3%	5%	14%	0%	2%	14
18 Jun	PeoplePolling	GB News	GB	1,228	15%	35%	12%	3%	8%	24%	0%	2%	11
17–18 Jun	YouGov	N/A	GB	1,625	20%	36%	14%	3%	7%	18%	1%	2%	16
14–18 Jun	Survation	Good Morning Britain	UK	1,008	20%	41%	12%	2%	6%	15%	–	5%	21
11–18 Jun	YouGov (MRP)	Sky News	GB	39,979	22%	39%	12%	3%	7%	15%	1%	2%	17
7–18 Jun	Savanta (MRP)	The Telegraph	GB	17,812	23%	44%	12%	3%	4%	13%	1%	0%	21
14–17 Jun	Focaldata	N/A	GB	2,604	21%	43%	10%	2%	5%	16%	–	2%	22
14–17 Jun	Deltapoll	N/A	GB	1,383	19%	46%	10%	2%	5%	16%	1%	–	27
14–17 Jun	Redfield & Wilton	N/A	GB	10,000	18%	43%	12%	3%	5%	18%	0%	1% Workers Party of Britain on 0% Alba Party on 0% Other on 1%	25
14–17 Jun	Verian	N/A	GB	1,034	21%	39%	13%	3%	7%	13%	1%	3%	18
13–17 Jun	Lord Ashcroft	N/A	GB	5,187	18%	43%	9%	3%	7%	18%	0%	3%	21
22 May – 17 Jun	More in Common (MRP)	The News Agents	GB	10,850	28%	44%	11%	3%	5%	8%	0%	1%	16
14–16 Jun	Savanta	The Telegraph	UK	2,046	21%	40%	11%	3%	4%	14%	–	5%	19
14–16 Jun	More in Common	N/A	GB	2,369	25%	41%	11%	2%	5%	14%	0%	2%	16
14–16 Jun	JL Partners	The Rest is Politics	GB	2,083	23%	40%	9%	3%	5%	18%	0%	1%	17
12–14 Jun	Opinium	The Observer	GB	2,059	23%	40%	12%	2%	7%	14%	1%	1%	17
12–14 Jun	Savanta	The Telegraph	UK	2,045	21%	46%	11%	2%	5%	13%	–	3%	25
12–13 Jun	Techne	N/A	GB	1,636	19%	43%	11%	2%	6%	16%	–	3%	24
12–13 Jun	YouGov	The Times	GB	2,211	18%	37%	14%	3%	7%	19%	1%	2%	18
12–13 Jun	Redfield & Wilton	N/A	GB	1,500	18%	42%	13%	3%	5%	17%	–	1%	24
12–13 Jun	We Think	N/A	GB	1,297	20%	43%	11%	2%	6%	14%	1%	2%	23
12–13 Jun	Whitestone Insight	Daily Express/Daily Mirror	GB	2,014	19%	41%	11%	3%	6%	17%	1%	2% Workers Party of Britain on 0% SDP on 0% Other on 2%	22
31 May – 13 Jun	Survation (MRP)	Best For Britain	GB	42,269	24%	40%	11%	4%	6%	12%	1%	2%	16
12 Jun	PeoplePolling	GB News	GB	1,234	19%	39%	10%	3%	9%	17%	–	3%	20
11–12 Jun	BMG	The i	GB	1,546	21%	41%	12%	3%	6%	14%	1%	1%	20
11–12 Jun	More in Common	The News Agents	GB	2,037	25%	41%	10%	3%	5%	13%	1%	1%	16
10–12 Jun	Norstat	N/A	GB	1,017	21%	41%	11%	3%	6%	17%	1%	2%	20
7–12 Jun	Ipsos (MRP)	N/A	GB	19,689	25%	43%	10%	3%	6%	12%	–	1%	18
10–11 Jun	YouGov	Sky News	GB	1,611	18%	38%	15%	2%	8%	17%	1%	1%	20
7–11 Jun	Focaldata	N/A	GB	3,124	24%	42%	9%	3%	5%	15%	–	2%	18
5–11 Jun	Survation	Good Morning Britain	UK	1,076	23%	41%	10%	3%	6%	12%	0%	4%	18
7–10 Jun	Verian	N/A	GB	1,305	20%	41%	11%	3%	8%	15%	1%	2% UKIP on 1% Other on 1%	21
7–10 Jun	Redfield & Wilton	N/A	GB	10,000	19%	45%	10%	3%	5%	17%	0%	1% Workers Party of Britain on 0% Alba Party on 0% Other on 1%	26
6–10 Jun	Lord Ashcroft	N/A	GB	4,975	21%	44%	7%	2%	8%	15%	0%	3%	22
7–9 Jun	Savanta	The Telegraph	UK	2,219	25%	44%	9%	3%	4%	10%	–	4%	19
7–9 Jun	JL Partners	The Rest is Politics	GB	2,004	24%	41%	11%	3%	5%	15%	0%	1%	17
6–8 Jun	Deltapoll	Mail on Sunday	GB	2,010	21%	46%	9%	4%	5%	12%	1%	0%	25
6–7 Jun	We Think	N/A	GB	1,198	20%	45%	10%	3%	5%	15%	1%	2%	25
5–7 Jun	Opinium	The Observer	GB	1,471	24%	42%	10%	3%	7%	12%	1%	1%	18
5–7 Jun	Savanta	The Telegraph	GB	2,095	26%	46%	10%	2%	3%	11%	1%	2%	20
5–7 Jun	More in Common	N/A	GB	2,618	25%	46%	9%	3%	6%	11%	0%	1%	21
5–6 Jun	Whitestone Insight	N/A	GB	2,001	22%	42%	9%	3%	5%	16%	0%	2% Workers Party of Britain on 1% SDP on 0% Other on 1%	20
5–6 Jun	YouGov	N/A	GB	1,650	19%	41%	11%	3%	7%	16%	1%	3%	22
5–6 Jun	Techne	N/A	GB	1,645	20%	44%	10%	2%	6%	15%	–	3%	24
5–6 Jun	Survation	N/A	GB	1,056	23%	43%	9%	3%	5%	15%	0%	2%	20
5–6 Jun	Redfield & Wilton	N/A	GB	2,000	19%	42%	12%	3%	6%	17%	0%	2% Workers Party of Britain on 1% Other on 1%	23
3–6 Jun	Focaldata	N/A	GB	2,077	25%	44%	9%	2%	5%	14%	–	2%	19
4–5 Jun	Norstat	N/A	GB	1,005	22%	45%	10%	3%	5%	14%	0%	1%	23
4–5 Jun	BMG	The i	GB	1,534	23%	42%	9%	4%	6%	16%	–	1%	19
3–4 Jun	YouGov (Note: Methodology change.)	Sky News	GB	2,144	19%	40%	10%	3%	7%	17%	1%	2%	21
31 May – 4 Jun	Ipsos	N/A	GB	1,014	23%	43%	8%	5%	9%	9%	1%	2%	20
3 Jun	Nigel Farage becomes leader of Reform UK												
2–3 Jun	PeoplePolling	GB News	GB	1,674	22%	46%	8%	3%	8%	10%	–	3%	24
1–3 Jun	More in Common	N/A	GB	2,055	27%	46%	8%	3%	5%	10%	1%	1%	19
31 May – 3 Jun	Deltapoll	N/A	GB	1,077	25%	48%	10%	2%	4%	9%	1%	2%	23
30 May – 3 Jun	Verian	N/A	GB	1,405	23%	41%	12%	3%	8%	9%	1%	2% UKIP on 0% Other on 2%	18
30 May – 3 Jun	Lord Ashcroft	N/A	GB	5,203	23%	47%	6%	2%	6%	11%	1%	3%	24
31 May – 2 Jun	Savanta	The Telegraph	GB	2,209	28%	42%	9%	3%	4%	9%	0%	2% Workers Party of Britain on 1% Other on 1%	14
31 May – 2 Jun	JL Partners	The Rest is Politics	GB	2,013	26%	43%	11%	3%	3%	12%	0%	0%	17
31 May – 2 Jun	Redfield & Wilton	N/A	GB	10,000	20%	46%	10%	2%	5%	14%	0%	2% Workers Party of Britain on 1% Other on 1%	26
22 May – 2 Jun	Survation (MRP)	Best for Britain	GB	30,044	24%	43%	10%	3%	4%	11%	1%	3%	19
24 May – 1 Jun	YouGov (MRP)	Sky News	GB	58,875	25%	43%	11%	3%	7%	10%	–	2%	18
30–31 May	Focaldata	N/A	GB	2,626	26%	43%	9%	2%	6%	12%	0%	1% Other on 1% Independent on 1%	17
30–31 May	We Think	N/A	GB	1,328	21%	46%	8%	3%	6%	13%	0%	2% Other on 1% Independent on 1%	25
29–31 May	Opinium	The Observer	GB	2,184	25%	45%	8%	3%	6%	11%	–	2%	20
30 May	Dissolution of Parliament and the official start of the election campaign												
29–30 May	Techne	N/A		1,630	21%	45%	11%	2%	6%	12%	–	3%	24
29–30 May	YouGov	The Times		2,040	21%	46%	8%	2%	6%	15%	1%	2%	25
29–30 May	Whitestone Insight	Daily Express/Daily Mirror		2,024	24%	44%	9%	3%	6%	11%	1%	2% Workers Party of Britain on 1% Other on 1%	20
28–29 May	BMG	The i		1,500	27%	43%	9%	2%	6%	11%	0%	2%	16
9 Apr – 29 May	More in Common (MRP)	N/A		15,089	29%	43%	11%	3%	5%	8%	0%	1%	14
27–29 May	More in Common	N/A		2,049	26%	45%	9%	2%	5%	11%	0%	1%	19
26–28 May	YouGov	Sky News		2,128	20%	47%	9%	3%	7%	12%	1%	2%	27
24–28 May	Lord Ashcroft	N/A		4,828	24%	47%	6%	3%	8%	11%	0%	2%	23
25–27 May	Redfield & Wilton	N/A		12,000	23%	46%	9%	3%	5%	13%	1%	2% Workers Party of Britain on 1% Other on 1%	23
24–27 May	Survation	N/A	UK	2,040	24%	47%	11%	3%	3%	8%	1%	3% UKIP on 0% Reclaim on 0% Other on 3%	23
20–27 May	FindOutNow/Electoral Calculus (MRP)	Daily Mail	GB	10,390	19%	46%	10%	3%	8%	12%	1%	2%	27
24–26 May	Savanta	The Telegraph	GB	2,235	27%	44%	10%	3%	4%	8%	1%	4%	17
24–25 May	JL Partners	The Rest is Politics	GB	2,013	28%	40%	10%	3%	5%	12%	1%	1%	12
23–25 May	Deltapoll	Mail on Sunday	GB	1,517	23%	45%	9%	3%	6%	10%	1%	2%	22
23–24 May	Opinium	The Observer	GB	2,050	27%	41%	10%	2%	7%	10%	–	1%	14
23–24 May	YouGov	The Times	GB	2,072	22%	44%	9%	3%	6%	14%	0%	1%	22
23–24 May	We Think	N/A	GB	1,242	22%	47%	8%	3%	6%	12%	–	2%	25
22–23 May	Techne	N/A	GB	1,643	19%	45%	12%	2%	5%	14%	–	3%	26
22–23 May	More in Common	N/A	GB	2,008	27%	44%	9%	3%	5%	10%	0%	1%	17
22 May	Prime Minister Rishi Sunak announces a general election for 4 July 2024												
21–22 May	YouGov	The Times	GB	2,093	21%	46%	9%	3%	7%	12%	0%	1%	25
21–22 May	Survation	N/A	UK	1,016	27%	48%	8%	3%	2%	8%	1%	3% Reclaim on 1% UKIP on 0% Other on 3%	21
3–22 May	YouGov	N/A	GB	10,108	20%	46%	9%	3%	7%	13%	1%	2%	26
17–20 May	Deltapoll	N/A	GB	1,968	23%	45%	10%	3%	5%	12%	1%	2% UKIP on 1% Other on 1%	22
19 May	Redfield & Wilton	N/A	GB	3,700	23%	45%	10%	2%	5%	12%	–	1%	22
17–19 May	Savanta	The Telegraph	GB	2,295	26%	43%	10%	3%	5%	9%	–	4%	17
17–19 May	More in Common	N/A	GB	2,308	27%	43%	9%	2%	6%	11%	1%	1%	16
16–17 May	We Think	N/A	GB	1,064	23%	46%	8%	2%	8%	11%	–	2%	23
15–17 May	Opinium	The Observer	GB	1,458	25%	43%	9%	3%	7%	10%	0%	2%	18
16 May	PeoplePolling	GB News	GB	1,476	20%	46%	8%	3%	8%	14%	0%	1%	26
15–16 May	Whitestone Insight	Daily Express/Daily Mirror	GB	2,024	24%	44%	8%	3%	6%	13%	0%	3% Workers Party of Britain on 1% Other on 2%	20
15–16 May	YouGov	The Times	GB	1,031	20%	47%	9%	3%	8%	11%	1%	1%	27
15–16 May	Techne	N/A	GB	1,641	21%	44%	12%	2%	6%	12%	–	3%	23
8–14 May	Ipsos	N/A	GB	1,008	20%	41%	11%	3%	11%	9%	1%	4%	21
10–13 May	Deltapoll	N/A	GB	1,031	27%	45%	8%	2%	6%	10%	1%	1% UKIP on 1% Other on 0%	18
9–13 May	Lord Ashcroft	N/A	GB	5,485	22%	45%	8%	3%	8%	11%	0%	3%	23
12 May	Redfield & Wilton	N/A	GB	3,000	21%	42%	12%	3%	6%	15%	–	1%	21
10–12 May	Savanta	The Telegraph	GB	2,090	25%	43%	12%	3%	4%	10%	–	4%	18
9–10 May	Survation	N/A	UK	1,054	24%	44%	10%	2%	7%	8%	–	5%	20
9–10 May	We Think	N/A	GB	1,183	24%	47%	9%	2%	6%	10%	–	3%	23
8–9 May	Techne	N/A	GB	1,638	21%	45%	11%	2%	6%	12%	–	3%	24
7–8 May	YouGov	The Times	GB	2,072	18%	48%	9%	3%	7%	13%	1%	2%	30
6–8 May	John Swinney is elected Leader of the Scottish National Party and First Minister of Scotland												
3–7 May	Deltapoll	N/A	GB	1,993	26%	43%	10%	3%	5%	10%	1%	1% UKIP on 1% Other on 0%	17
5 May	Redfield & Wilton	N/A	GB	2,000	21%	44%	9%	3%	5%	15%	–	1%	23
3–5 May	Savanta	The Telegraph	GB	2,267	27%	43%	11%	3%	4%	9%	–	4%	16
2–5 May	JL Partners	The Rest is Politics	GB	2,011	26%	41%	11%	3%	5%	13%	–	2%	15
2–3 May	More in Common	N/A	GB	2,135	26%	43%	10%	3%	5%	11%	–	1%	17
2–3 May	We Think	N/A	GB	1,177	24%	44%	8%	2%	6%	13%	–	2%	20
1–3 May	Opinium	The Observer	GB	1,402	24%	40%	11%	3%	7%	12%	1%	2%	16
2 May	Local elections in England; PCC elections; Blackpool South by-election (Lab gain from Con)												
1–2 May	Techne	N/A	GB	1,633	22%	44%	10%	2%	6%	13%	–	3%	22
30 Apr – 1 May	YouGov	The Times	GB	2,010	18%	44%	10%	2%	8%	15%	1%	2%	26
26–29 Apr	Deltapoll	N/A	GB	1,577	24%	44%	8%	3%	5%	12%	2%	1% UKIP on 1% Other on 0%	20
19–29 Apr	Labour Together	N/A	GB	9,403	22%	44%	10%	3%	6%	13%	1%	2%	22
28 Apr	Redfield & Wilton	N/A	GB	2,000	22%	45%	9%	3%	6%	14%	–	2%	23
26–28 Apr	More in Common	N/A	GB	2,053	24%	43%	11%	3%	6%	11%	–	2%	19
26–28 Apr	Savanta	The Telegraph	GB	2,144	26%	44%	10%	3%	3%	10%	–	4%	18
25–26 Apr	We Think	N/A	GB	1,265	22%	44%	9%	3%	6%	13%	–	3%	22
24–25 Apr	Techne	N/A	GB	1,642	23%	44%	9%	3%	6%	11%	–	3%	21
23–25 Apr	Survation	N/A	UK	2,036	26%	44%	9%	3%	4%	10%	–	5%	18
23–24 Apr	YouGov	The Times	GB	2,100	20%	45%	9%	3%	7%	13%	1%	2%	25
22–23 Apr	BMG	The i	GB	1,500	25%	41%	9%	3%	6%	14%	–	1%	16
19–22 Apr	Deltapoll	N/A	GB	1,525	27%	43%	9%	3%	5%	12%	1%	1% UKIP on 0% Other on 0%	16
21 Apr	Redfield & Wilton	N/A	GB	2,000	20%	43%	12%	3%	6%	14%	–	1%	23
19–21 Apr	Savanta	The Telegraph	GB	2,332	27%	43%	9%	2%	4%	10%	–	4%	16
18–19 Apr	We Think	N/A	GB	1,266	26%	43%	9%	2%	7%	11%	–	2%	17
17–19 Apr	Opinium	The Observer	GB	1,431	25%	41%	10%	2%	7%	13%	2%	1%	16
17–18 Apr	Survation	N/A	UK	1,010	26%	44%	11%	3%	4%	8%	–	4%	18
17–18 Apr	Techne	N/A	GB	1,640	22%	45%	9%	3%	5%	13%	–	3%	23
16–17 Apr	YouGov	The Times	GB	2,048	21%	44%	8%	3%	8%	14%	1%	2%	23
12–15 Apr	Deltapoll	N/A	GB	2,072	25%	45%	9%	3%	5%	11%	–	4%	20
11–15 Apr	Lord Ashcroft	N/A	GB	5,410	23%	44%	6%	3%	8%	11%	–	3%	21
3–15 Apr	Ipsos	N/A	GB	1,072	19%	44%	9%	3%	9%	13%	–	6%	25
14 Apr	Redfield & Wilton	N/A	GB	2,000	22%	44%	9%	3%	6%	15%	–	1%	22
12–14 Apr	Savanta	The Telegraph	GB	2,221	25%	43%	10%	3%	4%	9%	–	4%	18
11–12 Apr	We Think	N/A	GB	1,271	24%	44%	9%	2%	6%	11%	–	1%	20
10–11 Apr	Techne	N/A	GB	1,630	23%	44%	10%	3%	5%	12%	–	3%	21
10–11 Apr	YouGov	The Times	GB	2,044	19%	45%	8%	3%	7%	15%	0%	2%	26
7 Apr	Redfield & Wilton	N/A	GB	2,000	21%	44%	10%	2%	6%	15%	–	1%	23
5–7 Apr	Savanta	The Telegraph	GB	2,210	27%	42%	10%	3%	4%	10%	–	4%	15
4–7 Apr	JL Partners	The Rest is Politics	GB	2,011	24%	42%	10%	4%	5%	13%	–	2%	18
4–5 Apr	We Think	N/A	GB	1,280	24%	45%	10%	2%	5%	13%	–	2%	21
3–5 Apr	Opinium	The Observer	GB	1,318	25%	41%	10%	3%	8%	11%	1%	1%	16
4 Apr	PeoplePolling	GB News	GB	1,809	19%	45%	9%	4%	8%	14%	–	1%	26
3–4 Apr	Techne	N/A	GB	1,638	22%	45%	9%	3%	5%	13%	–	3%	23
2–3 Apr	BMG	The i	GB	1,530	25%	43%	8%	3%	6%	14%	–	1%	18
2–3 Apr	YouGov	The Times	GB	2,004	20%	43%	8%	3%	8%	16%	–	1%	23
31 Mar	Redfield & Wilton	N/A	GB	2,000	22%	46%	10%	3%	5%	14%	–	2%	24
27–28 Mar	Techne	N/A	GB	1,641	23%	44%	10%	3%	5%	12%	–	3%	21
27–28 Mar	We Think	N/A	GB	1,295	25%	44%	10%	3%	5%	10%	–	3%	19
26–27 Mar	YouGov	The Times	GB	2,061	21%	40%	10%	3%	8%	16%	2%	1%	19
25–27 Mar	Savanta	The Sun	UK	3,302	24%	45%	10%	3%	3%	12%	–	4%	21
7–27 Mar	YouGov (MRP) (Note: The headline voting intention figures are calculated by YouGov from its MRP seat projections.)	The Times	GB	18,761	24%	41%	12%	—	7%	12%	–	1%	17
23–24 Mar	More in Common	N/A	GB	1,966	27%	42%	10%	3%	5%	11%	1%	1%	15
22–25 Mar	Deltapoll	N/A	GB	2,072	26%	44%	9%	3%	6%	11%	–	2%	18
24 Mar	Redfield & Wilton	N/A	GB	2,000	22%	42%	12%	2%	6%	14%	–	2%	20
22–24 Mar	Savanta	The Telegraph	UK	2,216	24%	44%	10%	3%	4%	11%	–	4%	20
20–22 Mar	Opinium	The Observer	UK	1,874	25%	41%	10%	3%	8%	11%	–	2%	16
21–22 Mar	We Think	N/A	GB	1,270	24%	47%	10%	2%	6%	11%	–	2%	23
8–22 Mar	Survation (MRP)	Best for Britain	UK	15,029	26%	45%	10%	3%	4%	9%	–	3%	19
20–21 Mar	Techne	N/A	GB	1,632	22%	43%	10%	3%	6%	13%	–	3%	21
19–20 Mar	More in Common	N/A	GB	2,027	25%	43%	11%	3%	5%	11%	1%	1%	18
19–20 Mar	YouGov	The Times	GB	2,047	19%	44%	9%	3%	8%	15%	1%	1%	25
15–18 Mar	Deltapoll	N/A	GB	2,072	23%	46%	9%	2%	5%	12%	–	3%	23
17 Mar	Redfield & Wilton	N/A	GB	2,000	21%	47%	8%	3%	6%	14%	–	1%	26
15–17 Mar	Savanta	The Telegraph	UK	2,133	26%	44%	9%	3%	4%	11%	–	4%	18
14–15 Mar	Labour Together	N/A	GB	1,270	24%	42%	10%	3%	7%	–	—	13%	18
14–15 Mar	We Think	N/A	GB	1,270	25%	43%	10%	2%	6%	12%	–	2%	18
13–14 Mar	Techne	N/A	GB	1,624	22%	44%	11%	3%	5%	12%	–	3%	22
11–14 Mar	Survation	N/A	UK	1,043	26%	45%	11%	2%	3%	8%	–	5%	19
12–13 Mar	YouGov	The Times	GB	2,047	20%	44%	9%	3%	7%	14%	1%	2%	24
8–11 Mar	More in Common	N/A	GB	2,027	27%	42%	10%	3%	6%	10%	1%	1%	15
8–11 Mar	Deltapoll	N/A	GB	1,502	27%	44%	10%	2%	4%	11%	–	2%	17
7–11 Mar	Lord Ashcroft (Note: Values calculated from the weighted responses for each party, after excluding Don't Know and Would Not Vote.)	N/A	GB	5,299	23%	45%	6%	3%	8%	11%	–	5%	22
10 Mar	Redfield & Wilton	N/A	GB	2,000	24%	42%	12%	2%	5%	14%	–	1%	18
8–10 Mar	Savanta	N/A	GB	2,032	25%	43%	11%	3%	4%	9%	–	4%	18
7–8 Mar	We Think	N/A	GB	1,216	24%	43%	9%	3%	6%	13%	–	2%	19
6–8 Mar	Opinium	The Observer	UK	2,054	25%	41%	10%	3%	7%	11%	–	4%	16
7 Mar	PeoplePolling	GB News	GB	1,734	18%	46%	10%	4%	7%	13%	0%	2%	28
6–7 Mar	BMG	The i	GB	1,541	25%	41%	10%	3%	6%	13%	–	1%	16
6–7 Mar	YouGov	The Times	GB	2,053	20%	47%	9%	3%	7%	13%	1%	1%	27
6–7 Mar	Techne	N/A	UK	1,640	23%	44%	11%	3%	6%	11%	–	2%	21
1–4 Mar	Deltapoll	N/A	GB	1,500	27%	41%	9%	3%	6%	12%	–	3%	14
3 Mar	Redfield & Wilton	N/A	GB	2,000	23%	43%	10%	3%	6%	13%	–	2%	20
1–3 Mar	Savanta	N/A	GB	2,245	27%	44%	10%	3%	4%	8%	–	4%	17
29 Feb – 1 Mar	We Think	N/A	GB	1,240	23%	47%	9%	3%	5%	10%	–	3%	24
28 Feb – 1 Mar	Opinium	N/A	UK	2,050	25%	40%	10%	3%	7%	12%	–	3%	15
29 Feb	Rochdale by-election (WPB gain from Lab)												
28–29 Feb	YouGov	The Times	GB	2,100	20%	46%	7%	3%	7%	14%	1%	1%	26
28–29 Feb	Techne	N/A	UK	1,632	23%	44%	10%	3%	7%	10%	–	3%	21
21–28 Feb	Ipsos	Evening Standard	GB	1,004	20%	47%	9%	4%	8%	8%	–	2%	27
23–27 Feb	More in Common	N/A	GB	2,075	28%	43%	10%	3%	5%	9%	–	1%	15
23–26 Feb	Deltapoll	N/A	GB	1,490	23%	44%	11%	3%	5%	10%	–	3%	21
25 Feb	Redfield & Wilton	N/A	GB	2,000	23%	43%	10%	3%	8%	12%	–	2%	20
23–25 Feb	Savanta	N/A	GB	2,097	26%	44%	10%	3%	4%	10%	–	4%	18
21–23 Feb	Opinium	The Observer	UK	2,079	27%	42%	10%	3%	7%	10%	–	1%	15
22–23 Feb	We Think	N/A	GB	1,243	25%	44%	9%	3%	6%	10%	–	2%	19
21–22 Feb	Techne	N/A	UK	1,637	24%	44%	10%	3%	6%	10%	–	3%	20
20–21 Feb	YouGov	The Times	GB	2,035	20%	46%	9%	4%	7%	13%	1%	1%	26
16–19 Feb	Deltapoll	N/A	GB	1,519	27%	48%	8%	3%	6%	7%	–	2%	21
18 Feb	Redfield & Wilton	N/A	GB	2,000	23%	46%	9%	3%	6%	11%	–	1%	23
16–18 Feb	Savanta	N/A	UK	2,118	28%	42%	10%	3%	4%	8%	–	5%	14
15–16 Feb	We Think	N/A	GB	1,246	26%	46%	9%	2%	6%	8%	–	2%	20
14–16 Feb	Opinium	The Observer	UK	2,002	27%	43%	10%	3%	7%	9%	–	2%	16
15 Feb	Kingswood by-election and Wellingborough by-election (both Lab gain from Con)												
14–15 Feb	Techne	N/A	UK	1,628	23%	42%	11%	3%	7%	11%	–	3%	19
14–15 Feb	YouGov	The Times	GB	2,030	24%	44%	9%	3%	8%	11%	0%	1%	20
13–15 Feb	Survation	N/A	UK	1,020	29%	44%	9%	3%	3%	7%	–	4%	15
9–12 Feb	YouGov	WPI Strategy	GB	4,014	22%	45%	9%	3%	7%	12%	–	2%	23
8–12 Feb	Deltapoll	N/A	GB	1,977	27%	45%	8%	3%	4%	10%	–	2%	18
8–12 Feb	Lord Ashcroft	N/A	GB	5,046	27%	43%	7%	3%	8%	10%	–	3%	16
24 Jan – 12 Feb	FindOutNow/Electoral Calculus (MRP)	The Mirror	GB	18,151	22%	42%	11%	4%	7%	10%	–	4%	20
11 Feb	Redfield & Wilton	N/A	GB	2,000	21%	46%	11%	3%	5%	12%	–	2%	25
9–11 Feb	Savanta	N/A	UK	2,224	29%	41%	11%	3%	3%	8%	–	4%	12
7–11 Feb	More in Common	N/A	GB	2,050	29%	40%	11%	3%	6%	10%	–	1%	11
8–9 Feb	We Think	N/A	GB	1,171	26%	42%	11%	3%	6%	10%	–	2%	16
6–9 Feb	Opinium	The Observer	UK	2,050	25%	43%	11%	2%	7%	10%	–	3%	18
7–8 Feb	Techne	N/A	UK	1,639	24%	44%	10%	3%	6%	10%	–	3%	20
7–8 Feb	YouGov	The Times	GB	2,029	21%	46%	9%	3%	7%	12%	0%	1%	25
23 Jan – 7 Feb	Whitestone Insight	Lady McAlpine	GB	13,534	20%	42%	10%	3%	8%	13%	1%	2%	22
3–5 Feb	Redfield & Wilton	N/A	GB	5,000	23%	44%	11%	3%	5%	12%	–	1%	21
2–5 Feb	Deltapoll	N/A	GB	2,004	27%	43%	10%	3%	5%	9%	–	3%	16
4 Feb	Redfield & Wilton	N/A	GB	2,000	24%	45%	9%	3%	4%	12%	0%	2%	21
1–2 Feb	We Think	N/A	GB	1,283	23%	45%	9%	3%	9%	11%	–	2%	22
31 Jan – 1 Feb	Techne	N/A	UK	1,634	23%	45%	10%	3%	6%	10%	–	3%	22
30–31 Jan	BMG	The i	GB	1,505	29%	44%	11%	2%	6%	8%	–	1%	15
30–31 Jan	YouGov	The Times	GB	2,008	23%	44%	9%	3%	6%	12%	1%	2%	21
30–31 Jan	Survation	N/A	UK	810	27%	44%	11%	4%	3%	7%	–	5%	17
26–31 Jan	More in Common	N/A	GB	3,113	29%	43%	10%	3%	6%	8%	–	1%	14
29 Jan	Redfield & Wilton	N/A	GB	2,000	22%	45%	11%	3%	6%	12%	0%	1%	23
26–29 Jan	Deltapoll	N/A	GB	2,064	29%	43%	10%	2%	6%	9%	0%	2% UKIP on 1%	14
26–28 Jan	Savanta	N/A	UK	2,279	27%	46%	10%	2%	3%	9%	–	4%	19
26 Jan	We Think	N/A	GB	1,264	23%	47%	9%	2%	6%	12%	–	2%	24
23–26 Jan	Opinium	The Observer	UK	2,060	27%	42%	10%	3%	6%	10%	–	1%	15
25 Jan	PeoplePolling	GB News	GB	1,648	20%	45%	10%	4%	9%	12%	–	1%	25
24–25 Jan	Techne	N/A	UK	1,641	24%	44%	10%	3%	7%	9%	–	3%	20
23–24 Jan	YouGov	The Times	GB	2,008	20%	47%	8%	4%	6%	13%	1%	1%	27
17–23 Jan	Ipsos	Evening Standard	GB	1,003	27%	49%	7%	4%	7%	4%	–	1%	22
19–22 Jan	Deltapoll	N/A	GB	2,176	28%	45%	9%	3%	5%	8%	0%	1% UKIP on 1%	17
21 Jan	Redfield & Wilton	N/A	GB	2,000	22%	45%	11%	2%	6%	12%	1%	1%	23
19–21 Jan	Savanta	N/A	UK	2,017	29%	43%	10%	3%	4%	8%	–	4%	14
18–19 Jan	We Think	N/A	GB	1,163	23%	48%	9%	3%	5%	10%	–	2%	25
17–18 Jan	Techne	N/A	UK	1,640	25%	43%	11%	3%	6%	9%	–	3%	18
16–17 Jan	YouGov	The Times	GB	2,092	20%	47%	8%	3%	7%	12%	–	2%	27
12–15 Jan	Deltapoll	N/A	GB	2,136	28%	44%	10%	3%	6%	7%	0%	2% UKIP on 1% Other on 1%	16
11–15 Jan	Lord Ashcroft	N/A	GB	5,149	27%	44%	6%	3%	6%	10%	1%	2%	17
14 Jan	Redfield & Wilton	N/A	GB	2,000	25%	44%	10%	3%	5%	11%	–	2%	19
12–14 Jan	Savanta	N/A	UK	2,148	27%	44%	11%	3%	4%	7%	–	4%	17
11–12 Jan	We Think	N/A	GB	1,161	23%	45%	11%	3%	5%	11%	–	2%	22
10–12 Jan	Opinium	The Observer	UK	2,050	27%	41%	11%	4%	6%	10%	–	2%	14
10–11 Jan	Techne	N/A	UK	1,633	24%	44%	10%	3%	6%	10%	–	3%	20
10–11 Jan	YouGov	The Times	GB	2,057	22%	45%	9%	3%	8%	10%	–	2%	23
9–11 Jan	More in Common	Times Radio	GB	2,056	27%	42%	10%	3%	8%	9%	–	0%	15
7 Jan	Redfield & Wilton	N/A	GB	2,000	27%	43%	10%	3%	5%	11%	–	2%	16
5–7 Jan	Savanta	N/A	UK	2,268	26%	45%	10%	3%	5%	8%	–	4%	19
4–5 Jan	We Think	N/A	GB	1,226	25%	47%	9%	2%	5%	10%	–	2%	22
12 Dec – 4 Jan	YouGov (MRP)	Conservative Britain Alliance	GB	14,110	26%	39.5%	12.5%	3%	7.5%	9%	–	2.5%	13.5
2–3 Jan	YouGov	The Times	GB	2,016	22%	46%	10%	3%	7%	9%	–	2%	24

=== 2023 ===
Dates conducted	Pollster	Client	Area	Sample size	Con	Lab	LD	SNP	Grn	Ref	PC	Others	Lead
28–30 Dec	We Think	N/A	GB	1,181	26%	43%	11%	3%	6%	11%	–	2%	17
22–29 Dec	Deltapoll	Daily Mirror	GB	1,642	28%	42%	12%	2%	6%	9%	0%	2% UKIP on 2%	14
28 Dec	PeoplePolling	GB News	GB	1,987	23%	45%	10%	4%	6%	10%	1%	2%	22
21–22 Dec	We Think	N/A	GB	1,177	27%	41%	12%	3%	6%	9%	0%	2%	14
20–21 Dec	Techne	N/A	UK	1,646	23%	43%	11%	3%	7%	10%	–	3%	20
19–20 Dec	YouGov	The Times	GB	2,052	24%	43%	10%	3%	8%	11%	–	1%	19
15–18 Dec	Survation	N/A	UK	1,044	28%	45%	10%	2%	2%	8%	–	4%	17
17 Dec	Redfield & Wilton	N/A	GB	2,000	24%	42%	11%	4%	6%	10%	–	2%	18
15–17 Dec	Savanta	N/A	UK	2,286	27%	43%	10%	3%	3%	9%	–	5%	16
14–15 Dec	We Think	N/A	GB	1,065	25%	46%	10%	3%	5%	9%	–	2%	21
13–15 Dec	Opinium	The Observer	GB	1,426	27%	40%	11%	3%	7%	9%	–	2%	13
13–14 Dec	Techne	N/A	UK	1,637	22%	44%	12%	3%	7%	9%	–	3%	22
12–14 Dec	More in Common	N/A	GB	2,041	28%	42%	11%	4%	6%	8%	–	2%	15 (Note: The published lead was 15 points. This is not apparent from the party numbers due to rounding.)
12–13 Dec	YouGov	The Times	GB	2,018	22%	44%	10%	3%	7%	11%	–	2%	22
8–11 Dec	Deltapoll	N/A	GB	1,005	29%	40%	11%	3%	7%	7%	–	4%	11
10 Dec	Redfield & Wilton	N/A	GB	2,000	25%	43%	13%	2%	5%	11%	–	1%	18
8–10 Dec	Savanta	N/A	UK	2,079	26%	43%	10%	3%	4%	9%	–	4%	17
7–8 Dec	We Think	N/A	GB	1,201	25%	45%	11%	2%	5%	9%	–	2%	20
6–7 Dec	Techne	N/A	UK	1,642	22%	45%	12%	3%	7%	8%	–	3%	23
6–7 Dec	YouGov	The Times	GB	2,054	22%	45%	10%	3%	7%	11%	–	2%	23
1–7 Dec	Ipsos	N/A	GB	1,006	24%	41%	13%	3%	9%	7%	–	3%	17
1–4 Dec	Deltapoll	N/A	GB	1,000	27%	42%	13%	3%	6%	6%	–	4%	15
30 Nov – 4 Dec	More in Common	N/A	GB	2,030	29%	41%	12%	3%	6%	8%	–	2%	12
3 Dec	Redfield & Wilton	N/A	GB	2,000	26%	42%	12%	3%	6%	10%	–	0%	16
1–3 Dec	Savanta	N/A	UK	2,086	28%	43%	11%	3%	3%	7%	–	4%	15
30 Nov – 1 Dec	We Think	N/A	GB	1,123	28%	44%	9%	3%	6%	8%	–	3%	16
29–30 Nov	Techne	N/A	UK	1,629	23%	45%	11%	3%	7%	8%	–	3%	22
29–30 Nov	YouGov	The Times	GB	2,055	22%	45%	9%	4%	7%	10%	–	1%	23
28–30 Nov	BMG	The i	GB	1,502	27%	43%	10%	2%	5%	11%	–	2%	16
24–27 Nov	More in Common	Times Radio	GB	2,022	28%	44%	10%	3%	5%	8%	–	2%	16
24–27 Nov	Deltapoll	N/A	GB	1,996	28%	42%	11%	3%	6%	7%	–	2%	14
26 Nov	Redfield & Wilton	N/A	GB	2,000	25%	45%	11%	3%	6%	10%	–	1%	20
24–26 Nov	Savanta	N/A	UK	2,266	26%	44%	11%	3%	5%	7%	–	5%	18
23–24 Nov	We Think	N/A	GB	1,119	26%	44%	12%	3%	6%	8%	–	1%	18
22–24 Nov	Opinium	The Observer	GB	1,453	26%	42%	11%	3%	7%	8%	–	2%	16
22–23 Nov	Techne	N/A	UK	1,640	21%	46%	12%	3%	7%	8%	–	3%	25
22–23 Nov	YouGov	The Times	GB	2,069	25%	44%	10%	4%	7%	9%	–	2%	19
16–20 Nov	Deltapoll	N/A	GB	1,565	27%	44%	10%	3%	6%	6%	1%	2% UKIP on 2%	17
19 Nov	Redfield & Wilton	N/A	GB	1,160	24%	43%	14%	4%	5%	7%	–	1%	19
17–19 Nov	Savanta	N/A	UK	2,263	27%	44%	11%	3%	5%	7%	–	4%	17
16–17 Nov	We Think	N/A	GB	1,160	25%	45%	11%	3%	5%	10%	–	2%	20
15–17 Nov	More in Common	N/A	GB	2,031	29%	41%	13%	3%	5%	7%	–	2%	12
15–17 Nov	Opinium	The Observer	GB	1,433	27%	40%	12%	3%	6%	9%	–	3%	13
15–16 Nov	Techne	N/A	UK	1,632	22%	46%	11%	2%	7%	8%	–	3%	24
14–15 Nov	YouGov	The Times	GB	2,480	21%	44%	10%	4%	8%	10%	–	3%	23
14 Nov	PeoplePolling	GB News	GB	1,581	19%	49%	9%	3%	7%	11%	1%	2%	30
13–14 Nov	FindOutNow	The Mirror	GB	2,026	19%	46%	9%	5%	8%	10%	–	4%	27
10–13 Nov	Deltapoll	N/A	GB	1,840	28%	44%	13%	3%	6%	4%	1%	2% UKIP on 1% Other on 1%	16
12 Nov	Redfield & Wilton	N/A	GB	2,000	27%	43%	12%	3%	6%	8%	–	1%	16
10–12 Nov	Savanta	N/A	UK	2,230	28%	46%	10%	2%	4%	6%	–	4%	18
9–10 Nov	We Think	N/A	GB	1,147	24%	48%	9%	3%	6%	8%	–	2%	24
8–10 Nov	Opinium	The Observer	GB	1,433	26%	43%	11%	3%	6%	9%	–	3%	17
8–9 Nov	Techne	N/A	UK	1,634	25%	46%	10%	2%	7%	7%	–	3%	21
7–8 Nov	YouGov	The Times	GB	2,080	23%	47%	10%	3%	7%	8%	–	1%	24
1–8 Nov	Ipsos	N/A	GB	1,001	25%	46%	12%	5%	6%	4%	–	5%	21
31 Oct – 8 Nov	Lord Ashcroft	N/A	GB	2,518	27%	43%	10%	2%	7%	8%	–	3%	16
3–6 Nov	Deltapoll	N/A	GB	1,021	24%	45%	12%	3%	7%	6%	1%	3% UKIP on 2% Other on 1%	21
5 Nov	Redfield & Wilton	N/A	GB	2,000	28%	45%	11%	2%	4%	9%	–	1%	17
3–5 Nov	Savanta	N/A	UK	1,021	29%	45%	11%	2%	3%	5%	–	4%	16
2–3 Nov	We Think	N/A	GB	1,155	27%	45%	10%	3%	5%	9%	–	1%	18
31 Oct – 3 Nov	Survation	UK Spirits Alliance	GB	12,188	29%	46%	10%	3%	3%	5%	1%	2%	17
1–2 Nov	Techne	N/A	UK	1,635	26%	46%	11%	2%	6%	6%	–	3%	20
28 Oct – 2 Nov	More in Common	N/A	GB	2,043	28%	44%	10%	3%	7%	7%	–	1%	16
31 Oct – 1 Nov	YouGov	The Times	GB	2,193	23%	44%	9%	3%	9%	9%	–	1%	21
31 Oct	FindOutNow	N/A	GB	2,461	23%	45%	11%	4%	7%	8%	–	3%	22
27–30 Oct	Deltapoll	N/A	GB	1,546	25%	46%	11%	2%	6%	7%	0%	3% UKIP on 2% Other on 1%	21
29 Oct	Redfield & Wilton	N/A	GB	2,000	25%	45%	13%	3%	6%	7%	–	2%	20
27–29 Oct	Savanta	N/A	UK	2,043	29%	46%	9%	2%	3%	7%	–	4%	17
26–27 Oct	We Think	N/A	GB	1,189	26%	46%	10%	3%	6%	7%	–	3%	20
25–27 Oct	Opinium	The Observer	GB	1,433	27%	42%	10%	3%	7%	8%	–	2%	15
25–26 Oct	Techne	N/A	UK	1,630	25%	46%	11%	3%	5%	7%	–	3%	21
24–25 Oct	YouGov	The Times	GB	2,035	24%	48%	9%	4%	5%	8%	–	2%	24
23 Oct	PeoplePolling	GB News	GB	1,906	21%	49%	9%	4%	7%	9%	1%	1%	28
22 Oct	Redfield & Wilton	N/A	GB	2,000	26%	44%	13%	2%	4%	8%	–	1%	18
20–22 Oct	Savanta	N/A	UK	2,279	29%	46%	10%	2%	3%	5%	–	4%	17
19–20 Oct	Deltapoll	N/A	GB	1,036	27%	47%	10%	2%	5%	6%	1%	3% UKIP on 2% Other on 1%	20
19–20 Oct	We Think	N/A	GB	1,185	27%	48%	10%	2%	4%	7%	–	2%	21
19 Oct	Mid Bedfordshire by-election and Tamworth by-election (both Lab gain from Con)												
18–19 Oct	Techne	N/A	UK	1,634	26%	45%	11%	3%	6%	6%	–	3%	19
17–18 Oct	YouGov	The Times	GB	2,031	25%	47%	9%	3%	7%	7%	–	2%	22
11–18 Oct	Ipsos	N/A	GB	1,003	24%	44%	13%	4%	8%	4%	1%	3% UKIP on 2%	20
14–16 Oct	More in Common	N/A	GB	2,336	30%	42%	12%	3%	6%	7%	–	1%	12
13–16 Oct	Deltapoll	N/A	GB	1,568	27%	47%	10%	2%	6%	5%	1%	3% UKIP on 1% Other on 1%	20
15 Oct	Redfield & Wilton	N/A	GB	2,000	29%	43%	14%	1%	4%	7%	–	2%	14
13–15 Oct	Savanta	N/A	UK	2,258	29%	45%	10%	3%	2%	5%	–	4%	16
12–13 Oct	We Think	N/A	GB	1,198	28%	44%	9%	3%	6%	7%	–	2%	16
11–13 Oct	Opinium	The Observer	GB	1,461	28%	44%	10%	3%	6%	6%	–	3%	16
11–12 Oct	BMG	The i	GB	1,591	30%	43%	11%	2%	6%	7%	–	1%	13
11–12 Oct	YouGov	The Times	GB	2,067	24%	47%	9%	4%	6%	8%	–	1%	23
11–12 Oct	Techne	N/A	UK	1,635	26%	46%	10%	3%	6%	6%	–	3%	20
9 Oct	Redfield & Wilton	N/A	GB	2,000	27%	43%	13%	1%	6%	8%	–	2%	16
26 Sep – 9 Oct	Survation (MRP)	UK Anti-corruption Coalition	GB	6,466	29%	47%	11%	3%	3%	4%	1%	2%	18
6–8 Oct	Savanta	N/A	UK	2,000	30%	46%	10%	2%	3%	5%	–	4%	16
5–7 Oct	Deltapoll	Mail on Sunday	GB	1,517	28%	43%	12%	3%	6%	7%	1%	1% UKIP on 1% Other on 0%	15
6 Oct	Opinium	The Observer	GB	1,370	29%	42%	11%	3%	6%	6%	–	2%	13
5–6 Oct	We Think	N/A	GB	1,261	28%	44%	10%	2%	5%	6%	–	3%	16
5 Oct	Rutherglen and Hamilton West by-election (Lab gain from SNP)												
4–5 Oct	YouGov	The Times	GB	2,062	24%	45%	11%	4%	7%	8%	1%	1%	21
4–5 Oct	BMG	The i	GB	1,502	30%	44%	10%	2%	7%	6%	–	1%	14
4–5 Oct	Techne	N/A	UK	1,624	26%	45%	11%	3%	6%	6%	–	3%	19
29 Sep – 2 Oct	Deltapoll	N/A	GB	1,516	26%	44%	12%	3%	6%	5%	1%	3% UKIP on 2% Other on 1%	18
1 Oct	Redfield & Wilton	N/A	GB	2,000	29%	43%	12%	3%	4%	7%	–	1%	14
29 Sep – 1 Oct	Savanta	N/A	UK	2,129	27%	46%	11%	3%	4%	5%	–	4%	19
28–29 Sep	We Think	N/A	GB	1,285	27%	47%	10%	3%	5%	7%	–	1%	20
27–29 Sep	Opinium	The Observer	GB	1,993	29%	39%	12%	3%	7%	7%	–	3%	10
26–27 Sep	YouGov	The Times	GB	2,066	24%	45%	11%	3%	7%	8%	–	1%	21
26–27 Sep	Techne	N/A	UK	1,633	27%	45%	10%	3%	6%	6%	–	3%	18
22–25 Sep	Deltapoll	N/A	GB	2,507	28%	44%	10%	4%	6%	5%	1%	2% UKIP on 1% Other on 1%	16
11–25 Sep	Survation	38 Degrees	GB	11,793	29%	46%	12%	5%	3%	5%	1%	1%	17
24 Sep	Redfield & Wilton	N/A	GB	2,000	28%	43%	13%	2%	5%	8%	–	1%	15
22–24 Sep	Savanta		UK	2,093	30%	44%	11%	2%	4%	5%	–	4%	14
21–22 Sep	YouGov	The Times	GB	2,144	27%	43%	10%	4%	7%	8%	–	2%	16
21–22 Sep	We Think	N/A	GB	1,268	28%	45%	9%	3%	6%	6%	–	2%	17
20–21 Sep	Techne	N/A	UK	1,636	26%	45%	11%	3%	7%	5%	–	3%	19
18–20 Sep	More in Common	N/A	GB	1,355	28%	43%	12%	3%	6%	7%	–	0%	15
17 Sep	Redfield & Wilton	N/A	GB	2,000	26%	44%	14%	3%	6%	6%	–	1%	18
15–17 Sep	Savanta	N/A	UK	2,255	26%	46%	12%	3%	4%	5%	–	5%	20
14–15 Sep	We Think	N/A	GB	1,268	27%	44%	11%	3%	6%	7%	–	2%	17
13–15 Sep	Opinium	The Observer	GB	1,414	26%	41%	11%	3%	7%	8%	–	2%	15
13–14 Sep	YouGov	The Times	GB	2,049	24%	45%	9%	3%	9%	8%	–	2%	21
11–15 Sep	Deltapoll	N/A	GB	2,039	23%	47%	10%	4%	7%	6%	1%	2% UKIP on 1% Other on 1%	24
13–14 Sep	Techne	N/A	UK	1,634	26%	46%	10%	3%	6%	6%	–	3%	20
9–12 Sep	Ipsos	N/A	GB	1,004	24%	44%	12%	4%	8%	4%	–	3%	20
10 Sep	Redfield & Wilton	N/A	GB	2,000	25%	45%	12%	4%	6%	6%	–	1%	20
7–8 Sep	YouGov	The Times	GB	2,107	24%	46%	10%	4%	7%	6%	–	2%	22
7–8 Sep	We Think	N/A	GB	1,268	26%	46%	9%	3%	6%	6%	–	3%	20
6–7 Sep	Techne	N/A	UK	1,627	25%	46%	10%	3%	6%	7%	–	3%	21
1–4 Sep	Deltapoll	N/A	GB	2,009	28%	46%	10%	3%	5%	7%	1%	1% UKIP on 1% Other on 0%	18
31 Aug – 4 Sep	Kantar Public	N/A	GB	1,146	27%	43%	13%	5%	5%	4%	<1%	2% UKIP on 1% Other on 1%	15
3 Sep	Redfield & Wilton	N/A	GB	2,000	28%	44%	14%	3%	4%	6%	–	1%	16
1–3 Sep	Savanta	N/A	UK	2,223	29%	45%	10%	3%	3%	6%	–	5%	16
31 Aug – 1 Sep	Opinium	The Observer	GB	1,400	28%	42%	9%	3%	8%	8%	–	2%	14
31 Aug – 1 Sep	We Think	N/A	GB	1,294	25%	46%	11%	3%	5%	7%	–	2%	21
18 Aug – 1 Sep	Survation	Greenpeace	GB	20,205	29%	46%	11%	3%	3%	4%	1%	3% UKIP on 1% Reclaim Party on 1% Other on 0%	17
30–31 Aug	YouGov	The Times	GB	2,103	26%	44%	10%	4%	7%	7%	–	2%	18
30–31 Aug	Techne	N/A	UK	1,633	24%	45%	11%	3%	6%	8%	–	3%	21
27 Aug	Redfield & Wilton	N/A	GB	2,000	28%	44%	12%	3%	4%	7%	–	3%	16
25–27 Aug	Savanta	N/A	UK	2,159	29%	46%	10%	3%	4%	5%	–	3%	17
24–25 Aug	Deltapoll	N/A	GB	1,061	30%	46%	12%	3%	3%	5%	0%	2% UKIP on 1% Other on 1%	16
23–24 Aug	We Think	N/A	GB	1,356	26%	47%	11%	3%	5%	6%	–	2%	21
22–23 Aug	BMG	The i	GB	1,338	29%	44%	10%	3%	4%	8%	–	1%	15
22–23 Aug	YouGov	The Times	GB	2,106	24%	44%	9%	3%	8%	9%	1%	2%	20
17–21 Aug	Deltapoll	N/A	GB	1,520	25%	50%	9%	3%	7%	4%	1%	2% UKIP on 1% Other on 1%	25
20 Aug	Redfield & Wilton	N/A	GB	2,000	27%	42%	13%	3%	6%	7%	–	1%	15
18 Aug	Omnisis	N/A	GB	1,315	28%	44%	10%	3%	5%	7%	1%	2%	16
17–18 Aug	YouGov	The Times	GB	2,122	26%	45%	10%	3%	8%	7%	1%	1%	19
16–18 Aug	Opinium	The Observer	GB	1,452	26%	41%	11%	3%	7%	9%	1%	2%	15
14–16 Aug	More in Common	N/A	GB	2,052	29%	44%	11%	4%	6%	6%	–	0%	15
13 Aug	Redfield & Wilton	N/A	GB	2,000	28%	48%	10%	4%	4%	5%	–	0%	20
10–11 Aug	Omnisis	N/A	GB	1,345	24%	48%	10%	3%	6%	6%	1%	2% Other on 1% Independent on 1%	24
9–11 Aug	Deltapoll	Mail on Sunday	GB	1,504	29%	46%	12%	2%	5%	4%	1%	1% UKIP on 1% Other on 0%	17
4–7 Aug	Deltapoll	N/A	GB	1,023	26%	47%	12%	3%	4%	4%	1%	3% UKIP on 2% Other on 1%	21
6 Aug	Redfield & Wilton	N/A	GB	2,000	27%	45%	10%	3%	6%	8%	–	1%	18
3–4 Aug	Omnisis	N/A	GB	1,420	25%	47%	11%	3%	5%	7%	0%	2% Other on 1% Independent on 1%	22
2–4 Aug	Opinium	The Observer	GB	1,484	26%	40%	10%	3%	7%	10%	0%	2%	14
31 Jul – 4 Aug	FindOutNow/Electoral Calculus	Channel 4 News	GB	11,142	24%	44%	12%	4%	8%	6%	1%	2%	20
2–3 Aug	YouGov	The Times	GB	2,313	25%	47%	10%	3%	6%	7%	1%	1%	22
2–3 Aug	Techne	N/A	UK	1,624	26%	46%	10%	3%	5%	7%	–	3%	20
28–31 Jul	Deltapoll	N/A	GB	1,556	25%	48%	11%	3%	5%	6%	1%	1% UKIP on 1% Other on 0%	23
30 Jul	Redfield & Wilton	N/A	GB	2,000	28%	43%	11%	4%	5%	7%	–	3%	15
28 Jul	Omnisis	N/A	GB	1,339	25%	48%	10%	3%	6%	6%	0%	2%	23
26–27 Jul	Techne	N/A	UK	1,624	25%	45%	10%	3%	6%	8%	–	3%	20
25–26 Jul	BMG	The i	GB	1,524	27%	44%	14%	3%	4%	7%	–	2%	17
25–26 Jul	YouGov	The Times	GB	2,000	25%	45%	10%	3%	7%	7%	0%	2%	20
21–24 Jul	Deltapoll	N/A	GB	1,482	26%	49%	9%	3%	5%	4%	2%	2% UKIP on 2% Other on 1%	23
23 Jul	Redfield & Wilton	N/A	GB	2,000	28%	45%	14%	2%	4%	6%	–	1%	17
21–23 Jul	Savanta	N/A	UK	2,240	28%	47%	10%	3%	3%	4%	0	4%	19
19–23 Jul	Ipsos	Evening Standard	GB	1,065	28%	45%	12%	3%	6%	3%	1%	2% UKIP on 1% Other on 1%	17
20–21 Jul	Omnisis	N/A	GB	1,380	25%	47%	10%	3%	5%	7%	0%	2% Other on 1% Independent on 1%	22
19–21 Jul	Opinium	The Observer	GB	1,468	25%	42%	11%	3%	6%	10%	1%	2%	17
20 Jul	Selby and Ainsty by-election (Lab gain from Con), Somerton and Frome by-election (LD gain from Con) and Uxbridge and South Ruislip by-election (Con hold)												
19–20 Jul	Techne	N/A	UK	1,632	26%	45%	11%	3%	5%	7%	–	3%	19
19–20 Jul	YouGov	The Times	GB	2,069	25%	44%	10%	3%	7%	8%	1%	2%	19
18 Jul	More in Common	N/A	GB	1,584	29%	44%	12%	4%	5%	5%	–	1%	15
14–17 Jul	Deltapoll	N/A	GB	1,000	24%	48%	11%	3%	5%	6%	1%	2% UKIP on 1% Other on 1%	24
16 Jul	Redfield & Wilton	N/A	GB	2,000	27%	44%	13%	3%	4%	8%	–	1%	17
14–16 Jul	Savanta	N/A	UK	2,265	28%	46%	11%	3%	3%	5%	0%	4%	18
13–14 Jul	Omnisis	N/A	GB	1,361	25%	47%	10%	3%	5%	6%	1%	2% Other on 1% Independent on 1%	22
12–13 Jul	Techne	N/A	UK	1,628	26%	46%	11%	3%	5%	6%	–	3%	20
10–11 Jul	YouGov	The Times	GB	2,015	25%	43%	11%	4%	7%	9%	1%	2%	18
7–10 Jul	Deltapoll	N/A	GB	1,617	28%	46%	9%	4%	7%	4%	1%	2% UKIP on 1% Other on 1%	18
9 Jul	Redfield & Wilton	N/A	GB	2,000	27%	48%	11%	4%	3%	5%	–	1%	21
7–9 Jul	Survation	N/A	UK	838	28%	46%	12%	3%	3%	4%	0%	5% UKIP on 1% Reclaim Party on 0% Other on 4%	18
7–9 Jul	Savanta	N/A	UK	2,242	30%	45%	10%	3%	3%	5%	–	4%	15
6–7 Jul	Omnisis	N/A	GB	1,312	25%	51%	8%	3%	5%	5%	0%	2% Other on 1% Independent on 1%	26
5–7 Jul	Opinium	The Observer	GB	1,473	28%	43%	9%	3%	6%	8%	1%	2%	15
5–6 Jul	YouGov	The Times	GB	2,062	22%	47%	9%	3%	7%	9%	1%	2%	25
5–6 Jul	Techne	N/A	UK	1,632	26%	47%	10%	3%	5%	6%	–	3%	21
29 Jun – 3 Jul	Deltapoll	N/A	GB	1,507	25%	48%	10%	4%	5%	5%	0%	3% UKIP on 1% Other on 2%	23
2 Jul	Redfield & Wilton	N/A	GB	2,000	28%	46%	11%	3%	5%	5%	–	2%	18
30 Jun – 2 Jul	Survation	N/A	UK	1,013	30%	45%	11%	3%	3%	3%	0%	6% UKIP on 1% Reclaim on 0% Other on 4%	15
30 Jun – 2 Jul	Savanta	N/A	UK	2,216	28%	46%	11%	3%	4%	4%	–	4%	18
29–30 Jun	Omnisis	N/A	GB	1,351	26%	48%	8%	4%	5%	7%	0%	2% Other on 1% Independent on 1%	22
28–29 Jun	Techne	N/A	UK	1,631	27%	46%	11%	3%	5%	6%	–	2%	19
27–29 Jun	BMG	The i	GB	1,500	29%	43%	11%	3%	7%	6%	0%	1%	14
27–28 Jun	YouGov	The Times	GB	2,047	24%	46%	10%	3%	7%	8%	1%	2%	22
23–26 Jun	Survation	N/A	UK	2,054	28%	45%	11%	3%	3%	4%	0%	5% UKIP on 1% Reclaim on 0% Other on 3%	17
23–26 Jun	Deltapoll	N/A	GB	1,089	24%	47%	12%	4%	4%	7%	0%	1% UKIP on 1% Other on 0%	23
25 Jun	Redfield & Wilton	N/A	GB	2,000	26%	44%	13%	3%	5%	6%	–	3%	18
23–25 Jun	Savanta	TBA	UK	2,322	31%	43%	10%	4%	3%	5%	–	4%	12
22–23 Jun	Omnisis	N/A	GB	1,336	27%	47%	9%	3%	6%	6%	0%	2% Other on 1% Independent on 1%	20
21–23 Jun	Opinium	The Observer	GB	2,063	26%	44%	8%	2%	7%	10%	1%	2%	18
21–22 Jun	Techne	N/A	UK	1,629	29%	45%	10%	3%	5%	5%	–	3%	16
20–21 Jun	YouGov	The Times	GB	2,294	22%	47%	11%	3%	8%	7%	1%	2%	25
14–20 Jun	Ipsos	Evening Standard	GB	1,033	25%	47%	13%	3%	8%	3%	1%	1% UKIP on 0% Other on 1%	22
16–19 Jun	Deltapoll	N/A	GB	1,554	27%	46%	10%	4%	6%	5%	0%	1% UKIP on 1% Other on 0%	19
15–19 Jun	Survation	N/A	UK	1,007	29%	47%	11%	3%	3%	3%	0%	4% UKIP on 0% Reclaim Party on 0% Other on 3%	18
15–19 Jun	More in Common	N/A	GB	1,570	28%	47%	10%	4%	5%	6%	–	1%	19
18 Jun	Redfield & Wilton	N/A	GB	2,000	26%	46%	12%	3%	6%	7%	–	1%	20
16–18 Jun	Savanta	N/A	UK	2,196	28%	46%	11%	3%	3%	4%	–	5%	18
15–16 Jun	YouGov	The Times	GB	2,072	24%	43%	11%	4%	8%	7%	1%	2%	19
15–16 Jun	Omnisis	N/A	GB	1,306	26%	48%	10%	3%	6%	5%	1%	1% Other on 0% Independent on 1%	22
14–15 Jun	Techne	N/A	UK	1,625	28%	44%	11%	3%	5%	6%	–	3%	16
9–12 Jun	Deltapoll	N/A	GB	1,084	31%	42%	12%	4%	4%	4%	0%	2% UKIP on 2% Other on 0%	11
11 Jun	Redfield & Wilton	N/A	GB	2,000	30%	44%	13%	3%	4%	6%	–	1%	14
9–11 Jun	Savanta	N/A	UK	2,030	28%	45%	9%	4%	4%	6%	–	4%	17
2–11 Jun	YouGov	Times Radio	GB	9,903	26%	44%	10%	4%	7%	7%	1%	2%	18
7–9 Jun	Opinium	The Observer	GB	2,107	29%	41%	11%	3%	7%	6%	1%	2%	12
8–9 Jun	Omnisis	N/A	GB	1,296	27%	47%	10%	3%	5%	6%	1%	2% Other on 1% Independent on 1%	20
7–8 Jun	Techne	N/A	UK	1,632	29%	42%	12%	3%	6%	5%	–	3%	13
6–7 Jun	YouGov	The Times	GB	2,071	26%	42%	11%	4%	8%	7%	1%	2%	16
2–5 Jun	Deltapoll	N/A	GB	1,525	29%	43%	13%	3%	5%	5%	1%	2% UKIP on 2% Other on 0%	14
4 Jun	Redfield & Wilton	N/A	GB	2,000	30%	44%	12%	3%	5%	5%	–	1%	14
2–4 Jun	Savanta	N/A	UK	2,109	30%	44%	11%	3%	3%	5%	–	3%	14
1–2 Jun	Omnisis	N/A	GB	1,351	25%	46%	10%	3%	7%	6%	1%	2% Other on 1% Independent on 1%	21
31 May – 1 Jun	Techne	N/A	UK	1,630	29%	43%	12%	3%	6%	4%	–	3%	14
30–31 May	YouGov	The Times	GB	2,000	25%	44%	11%	3%	7%	6%	1%	2%	19
30–31 May	BMG	The i	GB	1,529	27%	44%	10%	4%	7%	7%	0%	2%	17
28 May	Redfield & Wilton	N/A	GB	2,000	28%	43%	12%	3%	7%	5%	–	3%	15
26–28 May	Savanta	N/A	UK	2,223	31%	44%	9%	3%	3%	5%	–	5%	13
25–26 May	YouGov	The Times	GB	2,072	25%	43%	11%	4%	7%	7%	1%	2%	18
25–26 May	Omnisis	N/A	GB	1,361	28%	47%	10%	3%	5%	5%	0%	2% Other on 1% Independent on 1%	19
23–26 May	Opinium	The Observer	GB	2,062	28%	43%	9%	3%	7%	6%	1%	3%	15
24–25 May	Techne	N/A	UK	1,625	30%	44%	11%	3%	5%	4%	–	3%	14
19–22 May	Deltapoll	N/A	GB	1,575	30%	47%	9%	4%	4%	4%	–	1% UKIP on 1% Other on 0%	17
18–22 May	Kantar Public	N/A	GB	1,143	29%	42%	11%	4%	5%	5%	–	4% UKIP on 1% Other on 3%	13
21 May	Redfield & Wilton	N/A	GB	2,000	30%	42%	13%	4%	4%	5%	–	2%	12
19–21 May	Savanta	N/A	UK	2,043	30%	46%	9%	3%	3%	5%	–	4%	16
18 May	Local elections in Northern Ireland												
17–18 May	YouGov	The Times	GB	2,006	25%	43%	12%	3%	8%	6%	1%	2%	18
17–18 May	Omnisis	N/A	GB	1,389	25%	47%	10%	3%	5%	6%	0%	2% Other on 1% Independent on 1%	22
17–18 May	Techne	N/A	UK	1,633	29%	45%	10%	3%	4%	5%	–	3%	16
10–16 May	Ipsos	Evening Standard	GB	1,006	28%	44%	13%	4%	6%	2%	–	4%	16
12–15 May	More in Common	N/A	GB	2,017	31%	42%	13%	3%	5%	5%	–	2%	11
12–15 May	Deltapoll	N/A	GB	1,511	29%	45%	12%	3%	4%	5%	0%	3% UKIP on 2% Other on 1%	16
14 May	Redfield & Wilton	N/A	GB	2,000	28%	42%	11%	4%	5%	8%	–	2%	14
12–14 May	Savanta	N/A	UK	2,214	29%	46%	9%	3%	3%	5%	–	4%	17
11–12 May	Omnisis	N/A	GB	1,355	24%	51%	10%	3%	4%	6%	1%	3% Other on 2% Independent on 1%	27
10–12 May	Opinium	The Observer		2,050	29%	43%	11%	3%	5%	6%	0%	3%	14
10–11 May	Techne	N/A	UK	1,625	28%	45%	11%	3%	5%	5%	–	3%	17
9–10 May	YouGov	The Times	GB	2,001	25%	43%	11%	3%	8%	7%	1%	2% UKIP on 1% Other on 1%	18
5–9 May	Deltapoll	N/A	GB	1,550	28%	47%	9%	3%	5%	5%	1%	3% UKIP on 1% Other on 1%	19
7 May	Redfield & Wilton	N/A	GB	2,000	29%	41%	16%	3%	4%	5%	–	1%	12
5–7 May	Savanta	N/A	UK	2,168	30%	46%	9%	4%	3%	5%	–	4%	16
4–5 May	Omnisis	N/A	GB	1,355	27%	48%	7%	4%	6%	6%	0%	1%	21
4 May	Local elections in England												
3–4 May	BMG	The i	GB	1,534	29%	43%	11%	3%	6%	5%	1%	2%	14
3–4 May	YouGov	The Times	GB	2,012	26%	43%	10%	4%	7%	6%	1%	3%	17
2–3 May	Techne	N/A	UK	1,632	29%	44%	11%	3%	5%	6%	–	3%	15
28 Apr – 2 May	Deltapoll	N/A	GB	1,561	29%	44%	11%	4%	4%	4%	1%	3% UKIP on 2% Other on 1%	15
30 Apr	Redfield & Wilton	N/A	GB	2,000	28%	45%	12%	2%	4%	7%	–	1%	17
28–30 Apr	Savanta	N/A	UK	2,241	31%	44%	9%	4%	3%	5%	–	4%	13
26–28 Apr	Opinium	The Observer	GB	1,425	26%	44%	10%	3%	7%	7%	0%	2%	18
24–28 Apr	Survation	Good Morning Britain	UK	2,014	28%	45%	12%	3%	4%	3%	1%	5%	17
26–27 Apr	Omnisis	N/A	GB	1,352	28%	45%	10%	4%	6%	6%	0%	2% Other on 1% Independent on 1%	17
26–27 Apr	YouGov	The Times	GB	2,111	27%	41%	11%	4%	7%	7%	1%	2%	14
26–27 Apr	Techne	N/A	UK	1,627	30%	44%	9%	3%	5%	6%	–	3%	14
24–26 Apr	Deltapoll	N/A	GB	1,576	30%	43%	9%	4%	5%	5%	1%	3% UKIP on 2% Other on 1%	13
23 Apr	Redfield & Wilton	N/A	GB	2,000	29%	44%	11%	3%	5%	6%	–	1%	15
21–23 Apr	Savanta	N/A	UK	2,156	31%	42%	9%	3%	3%	7%	–	5%	11
20 Apr	Techne	N/A	UK	1,626	31%	44%	10%	3%	5%	5%	–	3%	13
19–20 Apr	Omnisis	N/A	GB	1,318	27%	47%	7%	4%	6%	7%	1%	2% Other on 1% Independent on 1%	20
18–19 Apr	YouGov	The Times	GB	2,010	28%	43%	10%	2%	6%	7%	1%	2%	15
13–17 Apr	Deltapoll	N/A	GB	1,567	29%	43%	10%	4%	5%	4%	2%	2% UKIP on 1% Other on 1%	14
16 Apr	Redfield & Wilton	N/A	GB	2,000	32%	44%	10%	4%	4%	4%	–	1%	12
14–16 Apr	Savanta	N/A	UK	2,237	31%	45%	8%	3%	3%	5%	–	4%	14
12–14 Apr	Opinium	The Observer	GB	1,370	28%	42%	10%	3%	6%	8%	1%	2%	14
12–13 Apr	Techne	N/A	UK	1,630	30%	45%	10%	3%	4%	6%	–	3%	15
12–13 Apr	YouGov	The Times	GB	2,010	27%	45%	10%	3%	5%	6%	1%	2%	18
12–13 Apr	Omnisis	N/A	GB	1,340	25%	48%	9%	4%	5%	7%	1%	1%	23
6–11 Apr	More in Common	N/A	GB	2,046	30%	44%	10%	3%	6%	5%	–	2%	14
9 Apr	Redfield & Wilton	N/A	GB	2,000	30%	44%	10%	3%	5%	6%	–	2%	14
5–6 Apr	Omnisis	N/A	UK	1,328	26%	46%	10%	3%	5%	7%	1%	1%	20
5–6 Apr	Opinium	The Observer	GB	2,081	30%	41%	10%	3%	5%	7%	1%	4%	11
5–6 Apr	Techne	N/A	UK	1,629	30%	45%	9%	3%	5%	5%	–	2%	15
5–6 Apr	YouGov	The Times	GB	2,042	27%	44%	9%	4%	7%	6%	1%	2%	17
31 Mar – 3 Apr	Deltapoll	N/A	GB	1,587	27%	48%	9%	4%	4%	5%	1%	3% UKIP on 2% Other on 1%	21
2 Apr	Redfield & Wilton	N/A	GB	2,000	28%	45%	12%	4%	4%	5%	–	2%	17
31 Mar – 2 Apr	Savanta	N/A	UK	2,149	29%	45%	10%	3%	3%	5%	1%	4%	16
29 Mar – 2 Apr	Survation	N/A	UK	1,009	29%	46%	8%	4%	3%	5%	1%	5% UKIP on 0% Reclaim Party on 0% Alba Party on 0% Other on 4%	17
29–31 Mar	Opinium	The Observer	GB	2,050	29%	44%	9%	3%	5%	7%	1%	2%	15
29–30 Mar	YouGov	The Times	GB	2,002	26%	46%	9%	3%	7%	7%	1%	1%	20
29–30 Mar	Techne	N/A	UK	1,633	30%	46%	9%	3%	4%	5%	–	3%	16
29 Mar	PeoplePolling	GB News	GB	1,209	24%	42%	9%	5%	7%	8%	1%	5%	18
28–29 Mar	Omnisis	N/A	GB	1,344	27%	50%	9%	3%	4%	6%	1%	1%	23
27–29 Mar	Humza Yousaf is elected leader of the SNP and subsequently becomes First Minister of Scotland												
22–29 Mar	Ipsos	Evening Standard	UK	1,004	26%	49%	11%	5%	6%	2%	0%	1% UKIP on 1% Other on 0%	23
24–27 Mar	Deltapoll	N/A	GB	1,569	30%	45%	10%	4%	4%	4%	1%	4% UKIP on 2% Other on 1%	15
26 Mar	Redfield & Wilton	N/A	GB	2,000	27%	46%	10%	3%	4%	8%	–	2%	19
24–26 Mar	Savanta	N/A	UK	2,097	29%	45%	9%	4%	3%	4%	1%	4%	16
23–24 Mar	Omnisis	N/A	GB	1,382	29%	44%	10%	3%	5%	6%	0%	2% Other on 0% Independent on 2%	15
23–24 Mar	Survation	N/A	UK	831	31%	45%	8%	4%	3%	4%	1%	4% UKIP on 1% Alba Party on 1% Reclaim Party on 0% Other on 3%	14
22–23 Mar	Techne	N/A	UK	1,624	31%	46%	8%	4%	4%	5%	–	2%	15
22 Mar	PeoplePolling	GB News	UK	1,175	22%	43%	10%	4%	8%	9%	2%	3%	21
21–22 Mar	YouGov	The Times	GB	2,026	23%	49%	10%	3%	6%	6%	1%	2%	26
17–20 Mar	Survation	N/A	UK	812	31%	46%	8%	4%	2%	4%	1%	4% UKIP on 1% Reclaim Party on 0% Alba Party on 0% Other on 3%	15
17–20 Mar	Deltapoll	N/A	GB	1,054	35%	45%	7%	4%	4%	3%	0%	2% UKIP on 1% Other on 1%	10
19 Mar	Redfield & Wilton	N/A	GB	2,000	26%	47%	11%	4%	6%	5%	–	2%	21
17–19 Mar	Savanta	N/A	UK	2,175	31%	45%	9%	3%	3%	4%	1%	4%	14
16–17 Mar	PeoplePolling	GB News	UK	1,289	20%	45%	9%	5%	13%	6%	1%	2%	25
15–17 Mar	Opinium	The Observer	GB	2,000	29%	44%	8%	3%	6%	7%	1%	2%	15
15–16 Mar	YouGov	The Times	GB	2,155	27%	46%	9%	4%	6%	6%	1%	1%	19
15–16 Mar	BMG	N/A	GB	1,546	29%	46%	8%	4%	4%	6%	1%	2%	17
15–16 Mar	Techne	N/A	UK	1,632	30%	47%	8%	3%	4%	5%	–	2%	17
15 Mar	Omnisis	N/A	UK	1,126	25%	46%	6%	3%	7%	9%	0%	3% Other on 1% Independent on 2%	21
13–15 Mar	Survation	N/A	UK	1,011	32%	48%	8%	3%	2%	3%	0%	5% UKIP on 1% Reclaim Party on 0% Alba Party on 0% Other on 2%	16
10–13 Mar	Deltapoll	N/A	GB	1,561	27%	50%	9%	3%	4%	4%	1%	2%	23
12 Mar	Redfield & Wilton	N/A	GB	2,000	27%	48%	11%	3%	5%	6%	–	1%	21
10–12 Mar	Savanta	N/A	UK	2,093	30%	45%	9%	3%	3%	5%	1%	4%	15
8–10 Mar	Opinium	N/A	GB	2,000	29%	44%	8%	3%	5%	8%	1%	3%	15
8–9 Mar	Omnisis	N/A	GB	1,323	26%	50%	7%	4%	5%	6%	0%	2% Other on 1% Independent on 1%	24
8–9 Mar	Techne	N/A	UK	1,624	29%	46%	9%	3%	5%	6%	–	2%	17
8 Mar	PeoplePolling	GB News	UK	1,158	23%	42%	8%	4%	10%	7%	1%	5%	19
7–8 Mar	YouGov	The Times	GB	2,049	23%	45%	10%	4%	7%	7%	1%	2%	22
2–6 Mar	Deltapoll	N/A	GB	1,630	31%	47%	8%	4%	5%	4%	–	1% UKIP on 1%	16
5 Mar	Redfield & Wilton	N/A	GB	2,000	24%	50%	9%	3%	5%	7%	–	1%	26
3–5 Mar	Savanta	N/A	UK	2,138	32%	43%	9%	4%	3%	5%	1%	4%	11
2–3 Mar	Survation	N/A	UK	870	29%	45%	10%	3%	3%	4%	1%	5% UKIP on 1% Reclaim Party on 0% Alba Party on 0% Other on 4%	16
1–3 Mar	FindOutNow/Electoral Calculus	Daily Telegraph	GB	1,487	25%	48%	9%	4%	6%	5%	1%	1%	23
1–3 Mar	Opinium	Headlands Consultancy	GB	3,000	30%	42%	9%	3%	6%	8%	1%	3%	12
1–3 Mar	Opinium	The Observer	GB	1,419	27%	44%	7%	3%	7%	8%	0%	3%	17
2–3 Mar	Omnisis	N/A	GB	1,284	26%	45%	11%	4%	6%	6%	0%	2% Other on 1% Independent on 1%	19
1–2 Mar	Techne	N/A	UK	1,625	29%	47%	8%	3%	5%	6%	–	2%	18
1 Mar	PeoplePolling	GB News	UK	1,158	24%	45%	9%	5%	8%	7%	1%	3%	21
28 Feb – 1 Mar	YouGov	The Times	GB	2,073	25%	47%	10%	4%	5%	6%	1%	2%	22
22 Feb – 1 Mar	Ipsos	Evening Standard	UK	1,004	25%	51%	9%	5%	5%	3%	1%	0% UKIP on 0% BNP on 0% Other on 0%	26
24–27 Feb	Deltapoll	N/A	GB	1,060	31%	46%	8%	3%	4%	5%	1%	2% UKIP on 1% Other on 1%	15
26 Feb	Redfield & Wilton	N/A	GB	2,000	24%	51%	9%	3%	5%	7%	–	1%	27
24–26 Feb	Savanta	N/A	UK	2,224	29%	44%	9%	4%	3%	6%	1%	4%	15
22–23 Feb	Omnisis	N/A	GB	1,248	24%	48%	10%	4%	5%	8%	0%	1%	24
22–23 Feb	Techne	N/A	UK	1,633	27%	49%	8%	3%	5%	5%	–	3%	22
21–23 Feb	BMG	N/A	GB	1,500	29%	46%	9%	4%	4%	6%	1%	1%	17
22 Feb	PeoplePolling	GB News	UK	1,192	20%	46%	7%	5%	8%	9%	2%	4%	26
21–22 Feb	YouGov	The Times	GB	2,003	23%	46%	9%	4%	7%	8%	1%	2%	23
17–20 Feb	Deltapoll	N/A	GB	1,079	28%	50%	9%	4%	3%	2%	1%	2% UKIP on 1% Other on 1%	22
16–20 Feb	Kantar Public	N/A	GB	1,120	28%	45%	9%	5%	7%	5%	–	1% UKIP on 1%	17
17–19 Feb	Savanta	N/A	UK	2,103	31%	45%	9%	3%	3%	4%	1%	3%	14
18 Feb	Redfield & Wilton	N/A	GB	2,000	24%	51%	10%	3%	5%	6%	–	1%	27
15–17 Feb	Opinium	The Observer	GB	1,451	28%	44%	9%	4%	6%	7%	–	2%	16
15–16 Feb	Omnisis	N/A	GB	1,259	25%	48%	10%	3%	5%	7%	0%	1%	23
15–16 Feb	Techne	N/A	UK	1,631	27%	48%	8%	3%	5%	6%	–	3%	21
10–16 Feb	Survation	N/A	UK	6,094	29%	48%	8%	3%	3%	4%	1%	5% UKIP on 1% Reclaim Party on 0% Alba Party on 0% Other on 3%	19
15 Feb	PeoplePolling	GB News	UK	1,148	21%	48%	8%	5%	8%	7%	1%	3%	27
14–15 Feb	YouGov	The Times	GB	2,062	22%	50%	9%	4%	6%	7%	1%	1%	28
10–13 Feb	Deltapoll	N/A	GB	1,004	28%	48%	8%	5%	6%	3%	1%	1%	20
12 Feb	Redfield & Wilton	N/A	GB	2,000	27%	48%	9%	4%	5%	6%	–	1%	21
10–12 Feb	Focaldata	N/A	GB	1,041	28%	48%	9%	3%	4%	6%	–	2%	20
10–12 Feb	Savanta	N/A	UK	2,175	28%	45%	10%	3%	4%	5%	0%	4%	17
9–10 Feb	Omnisis	N/A	GB	1,281	26%	47%	10%	4%	4%	8%	0%	1%	21
9 Feb	West Lancashire by-election (Lab hold)												
8–9 Feb	PeoplePolling	GB News	UK	1,229	21%	50%	7%	4%	6%	7%	1%	3%	29
8–9 Feb	Techne	N/A	UK	1,627	26%	47%	9%	4%	5%	6%	–	3%	21
8–9 Feb	YouGov	The Times	GB	2,061	24%	47%	10%	4%	6%	6%	1%	2%	23
3–6 Feb	Deltapoll	N/A	GB	1,831	29%	47%	9%	4%	4%	5%	1%	2% UKIP on 1% Other on 1%	18
1–6 Feb	Survation	N/A	UK	1,923	26%	42%	11%	4%	5%	6%	1%	5% UKIP on 1% Reclaim Party on 0% Alba Party on 0% Other on 4%	16
5 Feb	Redfield & Wilton	N/A	GB	2,000	24%	50%	10%	3%	5%	6%	1%	1%	26
3–5 Feb	Savanta	N/A	UK	2,247	27%	46%	9%	3%	4%	5%	0%	4%	19
27 Jan – 5 Feb	FindOutNow/Electoral Calculus	The Daily Telegraph	GB	28,191	23%	48%	11%	4%	5%	5%	–	—	25
2–3 Feb	Omnisis	N/A	GB	1,324	24%	48%	9%	4%	5%	6%	0%	3% Other on 1% Independent on 2%	24
1–2 Feb	Techne	N/A	UK	1,634	27%	48%	8%	4%	4%	7%	—	2%	21
1 Feb	PeoplePolling	GB News	UK	1,139	22%	46%	9%	5%	7%	7%	2%	2%	24
31 Jan – 1 Feb	YouGov	The Times	GB	2,006	24%	48%	9%	4%	6%	6%	1%	2%	24
26–30 Jan	Deltapoll	N/A	GB	1,057	29%	46%	9%	4%	4%	4%	1%	2% UKIP on 1% Other on 1%	17
29 Jan	Redfield & Wilton	N/A	GB	2,000	28%	49%	8%	4%	5%	5%	—	1%	21
29 Jan	Savanta	N/A	UK	2,041	26%	47%	9%	3%	4%	6%	0%	5%	21
26–27 Jan	Omnisis	N/A	GB	1,311	26%	50%	7%	3%	6%	7%	0%	2% Other on 1% Independent on 1%	24
25–26 Jan	Techne	N/A	UK	1,631	26%	47%	8%	4%	5%	7%	—	3%	21
24–26 Jan	BMG	N/A	GB	1,502	29%	46%	9%	4%	3%	6%	1%	2%	17
24–25 Jan	YouGov	The Times	GB	2,058	26%	45%	10%	4%	7%	6%	1%	2%	19
18–25 Jan	Ipsos	N/A	UK	1,001	26%	51%	9%	6%	5%	2%	1%	2% UKIP on 1% BNP on 1%	25
24 Jan	PeoplePolling	GB News	UK	1,270	21%	50%	8%	6%	5%	7%	1%	3%	29
22 Jan	Redfield & Wilton	N/A	GB	2,000	26%	48%	9%	5%	4%	6%	—	1%	22
19–21 Jan	Deltapoll	N/A	GB	1,563	30%	44%	9%	4%	5%	4%	1%	4% UKIP on 3% Other on 1%	14
19–20 Jan	Omnisis	N/A	GB	1,268	24%	50%	8%	4%	5%	5%	0%	3%	26
18–19 Jan	Techne	N/A	UK	1,625	27%	46%	9%	4%	5%	6%	—	3%	19
18–19 Jan	YouGov	The Times	GB	2,004	26%	48%	8%	4%	5%	7%	1%	1%	22
18 Jan	PeoplePolling	GB News	UK	1,168	21%	45%	9%	5%	9%	8%	1%	3%	24
17–18 Jan	Focaldata	Sam Freedman	GB	1,028	24%	49%	9%	3%	4%	7%	—	4%	25
12–16 Jan	Deltapoll	N/A	GB	1,059	29%	45%	10%	5%	5%	4%	—	3% UKIP on 3%	16
15 Jan	Redfield & Wilton	N/A	GB	2,000	27%	47%	10%	4%	5%	6%	—	1%	20
11–13 Jan	Opinium	The Observer	GB	2,000	29%	45%	9%	3%	5%	6%	1%	2%	16
11–12 Jan	Techne	N/A	UK	1,636	26%	47%	8%	4%	5%	7%	—	3%	21
11–12 Jan	Omnisis	N/A	GB	1,247	28%	48%	7%	4%	7%	3%	0%	1%	20
11 Jan	PeoplePolling	GB News	UK	1,160	21%	48%	8%	5%	7%	7%	1%	3%	27
10–11 Jan	YouGov	The Times	GB	1,691	25%	47%	9%	5%	5%	7%	1%	1%	22
20 Dec – 11 Jan	YouGov	The Times	GB	4,922	24%	47%	9%	5%	5%	7%	1%	2%	23
8 Jan	Redfield & Wilton	N/A	GB	2,000	26%	48%	9%	4%	5%	6%	—	2%	22
5–7 Jan	Deltapoll	N/A	GB	1,593	31%	45%	9%	3%	5%	3%	—	3% UKIP on 2% Other on 1%	14
5–6 Jan	Omnisis	N/A	GB	1,285	27%	49%	10%	4%	4%	4%	0%	1%	22
4–5 Jan	YouGov	The Times	GB	1,709	25%	46%	9%	5%	6%	7%	1%	2%	21
4–5 Jan	Techne	N/A	UK	1,625	25%	46%	9%	4%	5%	8%	—	3%	21
4 Jan	PeoplePolling	GB News	GB	1,209	22%	46%	7%	5%	7%	8%	1%	6%	24
2–3 Jan	Redfield & Wilton	N/A	GB	2,000	27%	47%	12%	4%	3%	5%	—	1%	20

=== 2022 ===
Dates conducted	Pollster	Client	Area	Sample size	Con	Lab	LD	SNP	Grn	Ref	PC	Others	Lead
28 Dec	PeoplePolling	GB News	GB	1,169	19%	45%	8%	6%	9%	8%	1%	3%	26
21–22 Dec	Omnisis	N/A	GB	1,243	25%	51%	7%	4%	5%	6%	0%	2%	26
21–22 Dec	Techne	N/A	UK	1,633	28%	45%	8%	4%	5%	7%	—	3%	17
21 Dec	PeoplePolling	GB News	GB	1,151	22%	46%	8%	5%	6%	8%	—	3%	24
20–21 Dec	YouGov	The Times	GB	1,672	24%	48%	9%	4%	5%	8%	1%	2%	24
16–18 Dec	Savanta	N/A	UK	2,024	28%	45%	9%	5%	3%	5%	—	5%	17
15–16 Dec	Omnisis	N/A	GB	1,216	26%	47%	9%	5%	6%	6%	—	1%	21
14–16 Dec	Opinium	The Observer	GB	2,000	29%	44%	9%	3%	5%	8%	1%	2%	15
15 Dec	Stretford and Urmston by-election (Lab hold)												
14–15 Dec	YouGov	The Times	GB	1,690	23%	48%	8%	5%	5%	9%	1%	1%	25
14–15 Dec	Techne	N/A	UK	1,631	28%	46%	9%	3%	5%	6%	—	3%	18
14 Dec	PeoplePolling	GB News	GB	1,151	24%	45%	7%	5%	6%	7%	—	4%	21
7–13 Dec	Ipsos	N/A	GB	1,007	23%	49%	13%	5%	3%	2%	—	4%	26
9–12 Dec	Kantar Public	N/A	GB	1,097	29%	46%	9%	5%	5%	4%	—	3% UKIP on 2% Other on 1%	17
9–12 Dec	Deltapoll	N/A	GB	1,088	32%	45%	9%	5%	5%	4%	1%	3% UKIP on 2% Other on 1%	13
11 Dec	Redfield & Wilton	N/A	GB	2,000	29%	46%	9%	3%	5%	7%	1%	1%	17
9–11 Dec	Savanta	N/A	UK	2,194	29%	45%	8%	3%	3%	6%	—	5%	16
8–9 Dec	Omnisis	N/A	GB	1,294	30%	48%	9%	2%	6%	4%	—	1% Independent on 0% Other on 1%	18
7 Dec	PeoplePolling	GB News	GB	1,231	20%	47%	8%	5%	6%	9%	—	5%	27
7–8 Dec	Techne	N/A	UK	1,625	27%	48%	9%	4%	4%	5%	—	3%	21
6–7 Dec	YouGov	The Times	GB	1,696	24%	48%	9%	4%	5%	8%	1%	2%	24
1–5 Dec	Deltapoll	N/A	GB	1,632	28%	48%	10%	4%	4%	4%	1%	1% UKIP on 1% Other on 0%	20
2–5 Dec	Savanta	N/A	UK	6,237	28%	48%	11%	—	3%	4%	—	—	20
4 Dec	Redfield & Wilton	N/A	GB	2,000	26%	48%	10%	3%	6%	5%	—	1%	22
2–4 Dec	Savanta	N/A	UK	2,211	31%	42%	10%	4%	3%	5%	1%	4%	11
1–2 Dec	Omnisis	N/A	GB	1,189	25%	48%	9%	4%	6%	5%	—	4% Independent on 1% Other on 3%	23
30 Nov – 2 Dec	Opinium	The Observer	GB	2,000	29%	43%	8%	4%	6%	6%	1%	2%	14
1 Dec	City of Chester by-election (Lab hold)												
1 Dec	Techne	N/A	UK	1,632	26%	49%	10%	4%	4%	5%	—	2%	23
29 Nov – 1 Dec	BMG	The i	GB	1,571	28%	46%	10%	4%	5%	6%	0%	2%	18
30 Nov	PeoplePolling	GB News	GB	1,145	21%	46%	7%	5%	9%	7%	1%	3%	25
29–30 Nov	YouGov	The Times	GB	1,637	22%	47%	9%	4%	5%	9%	1%	2%	25
24–28 Nov	Deltapoll	N/A	GB	1,062	30%	48%	10%	3%	3%	4%	—	2% UKIP on 1% Other on 1%	18
27 Nov	Redfield & Wilton	N/A	GB	2,000	27%	47%	11%	3%	5%	5%	—	1%	20
25–27 Nov	Savanta ComRes	N/A	UK	2,106	26%	47%	10%	4%	2%	5%	1%	4%	21
23–24 Nov	Omnisis	N/A	GB	1,174	25%	49%	9%	3%	5%	6%	1%	2%	24
23–24 Nov	Techne	N/A	UK	1,625	27%	50%	9%	4%	4%	—	—	6%	23
23 Nov	PeoplePolling	N/A	GB	1,145	24%	44%	8%	5%	8%	5%	1%	5%	20
22–23 Nov	YouGov	The Times	GB	1,672	25%	48%	9%	4%	5%	5%	1%	2%	23
17–21 Nov	Kantar Public	N/A	GB	1,111	30%	45%	8%	5%	4%	5%	—	4% UKIP on 2% Other on 2%	15
20 Nov	Redfield & Wilton	N/A	GB	2,000	28%	49%	9%	4%	4%	5%	—	2%	21
18–20 Nov	Savanta ComRes	Independent	UK	2,106	28%	46%	10%	3%	3%	3%	—	6%	18
17–19 Nov	Deltapoll	The Mail on Sunday	GB	1,604	25%	51%	9%	3%	4%	4%	0%	4% UKIP on 2% Other on 2%	26
18 Nov	PeoplePolling	GB News	GB	1,331	21%	47%	10%	5%	7%	6%	1%	4%	26
17–18 Nov	Opinium	The Observer	GB	1,484	28%	45%	9%	3%	4%	6%	—	3%	17
17–18 Nov	Omnisis	N/A	GB	1,159	21%	48%	10%	5%	7%	5%	1%	4%	27
17 Nov	Techne	N/A	UK	1,628	28%	50%	8%	4%	4%	—	—	6%	22
16–17 Nov	Redfield & Wilton	N/A	GB	1,500	27%	48%	10%	5%	4%	5%	—	1%	21
15–16 Nov	YouGov	The Times	GB	1,682	26%	47%	9%	5%	5%	6%	1%	2%	21
9–16 Nov	Ipsos	Evening Standard	GB	1,004	29%	50%	7%	5%	3%	2%	1%	2% UKIP on 1% Other on 1%	21
10–14 Nov	Deltapoll	N/A	GB	1,060	27%	50%	6%	5%	6%	3%	1%	3% UKIP on 2%	23
13 Nov	Redfield & Wilton	N/A	GB	2,000	26%	50%	9%	3%	5%	4%	—	2%	24
10–11 Nov	Omnisis	N/A	GB	1,181	26%	49%	7%	3%	5%	9%	—	1%	23
9–10 Nov	Redfield & Wilton	N/A	GB	1,500	28%	49%	11%	3%	4%	4%	—	1%	21
9–10 Nov	YouGov	The Times	GB	1,708	25%	48%	10%	5%	5%	5%	1%	2%	23
9–10 Nov	Techne	N/A	UK	1,628	30%	49%	8%	4%	4%	—	—	5%	19
9 Nov	PeoplePolling	GB News	GB	1,198	21%	42%	9%	5%	9%	8%	2%	4%	21
4–7 Nov	Deltapoll	N/A	GB	1,049	29%	47%	9%	4%	5%	3%	—	4%	18
6 Nov	Redfield & Wilton	N/A	GB	2,000	27%	48%	10%	4%	3%	5%	—	2%	21
3–4 Nov	Omnisis	N/A	GB	1,352	27%	51%	7%	4%	4%	6%	1%	—	24
2–4 Nov	Opinium	The Observer	UK	1,445	28%	46%	8%	4%	6%	—	—	7%	18
2–3 Nov	Redfield & Wilton	N/A	GB	1,500	30%	47%	12%	3%	3%	4%	—	1%	17
2–3 Nov	Techne	N/A	UK	1,663	29%	49%	9%	4%	4%	—	—	3%	20
1–3 Nov	Survation	N/A	UK	1,017	27%	50%	7%	4%	3%	3%	1%	5% UKIP on 2% Other on 3%	23
1–2 Nov	YouGov	The Times	GB	1,702	24%	50%	9%	4%	5%	6%	1%	2%	26
1 Nov	PeoplePolling	GB News	GB	1,212	21%	47%	10%	5%	5%	5%	1%	4%	26
28–31 Oct	Deltapoll	N/A	GB	1,606	26%	51%	9%	4%	4%	3%	1%	3% UKIP on 2% Other on 1%	25
24–31 Oct	YouGov	Ben Ansell/ERC WEALTHPOL	UK	2,464	25%	49%	9%	4%	5%	4%	1%	2%	24
30 Oct	Redfield & Wilton	N/A	GB	2,000	27%	50%	9%	4%	5%	3%	—	2%	23
28–30 Oct	Focaldata	Best for Britain	GB	2,000	29%	49%	8%	4%	4%	4%	0%	2%	20
27–28 Oct	Omnisis	N/A	GB	1,383	25%	53%	7%	4%	4%	6%	1%	2%	28
26–28 Oct	Opinium	The Observer	UK	1,499	28%	44%	10%	4%	5%	—	—	8%	16
26–27 Oct	Techne	N/A	UK	1,626	26%	50%	10%	4%	5%	—	—	5%	24
26–27 Oct	Survation	N/A	UK	2,028	27%	51%	8%	5%	2%	3%	1%	3%	24
26 Oct	PeoplePolling	GB News	GB	1,237	20%	51%	9%	5%	5%	7%	—	5%	31
25–26 Oct	Redfield & Wilton	N/A	GB	1,500	23%	55%	9%	4%	5%	4%	—	1%	32
25–26 Oct	YouGov	The Times	GB	1,646	23%	51%	9%	5%	4%	6%	1%	1%	28
24–26 Oct	BMG	Independent	GB	1,568	26%	49%	10%	4%	5%	5%	—	2%	23
20–26 Oct	Focaldata	Best for Britain	GB	10,000	23%	53%	10%	4%	4%	4%	0%	2%	30
24–25 Oct	Rishi Sunak is elected leader of the Conservative Party and subsequently becomes Prime Minister												
23 Oct	Redfield & Wilton	N/A	GB	2,000	21%	54%	11%	3%	4%	4%	—	2%	33
22–23 Oct	Deltapoll	Sky News	GB	2,012	25%	51%	10%	4%	5%	3%	1%	2% UKIP on 1% Other on 1%	26
21–23 Oct	Savanta ComRes	Independent	UK	1,996	25%	51%	8%	4%	2%	—	—	10%	26
21–22 Oct	Omnisis	N/A	GB	1,353	22%	56%	10%	4%	4%	3%	1%	1%	34
19–21 Oct	JL Partners	N/A	GB	2,000	26%	51%	8%	5%	3%	3%	—	4%	25
20–21 Oct	YouGov	The Times	GB	1,700	19%	56%	10%	4%	4%	5%	1%	1%	37
19–21 Oct	Opinium	The Observer	UK	2,023	23%	50%	9%	3%	6%	—	—	6%	27
20 Oct	PeoplePolling	GB News	GB	1,237	14%	53%	11%	5%	6%	5%	—	5%	39
20 Oct	Omnisis	N/A	GB	1,382	22%	57%	7%	4%	4%	3%	—	3%	35
19–20 Oct	Techne	N/A	UK	1,632	22%	53%	11%	4%	5%	—	—	5%	31
20 Oct	Liz Truss announces her resignation as leader of the Conservative Party and Prime Minister, triggering a leadership election												
19 Oct	Redfield & Wilton	N/A	GB	2,500	19%	55%	12%	4%	4%	4%	—	1%	36
18–19 Oct	Survation	N/A	UK	1,252	23%	52%	11%	4%	3%	2%	1%	4% UKIP on 1% Other on 3%	29
13–17 Oct	Deltapoll	N/A	GB	1,050	23%	55%	7%	4%	4%	3%	1%	1%	32
16 Oct	Redfield & Wilton	N/A	GB	2,000	20%	56%	11%	4%	5%	2%	—	1%	36
14–16 Oct	Savanta ComRes	N/A	UK	2,195	22%	52%	11%	4%	2%	—	—	8%	30
13–14 Oct	Omnisis	N/A	GB	1,328	28%	49%	10%	3%	5%	2%	1%	2%	21
13 Oct	Redfield & Wilton	N/A	GB	1,500	24%	53%	13%	4%	3%	2%	—	3%	29
12–13 Oct	Techne	N/A	UK	1,626	25%	49%	11%	4%	6%	—	—	5%	24
12 Oct	PeoplePolling	GB News	GB	1,158	19%	53%	8%	6%	6%	4%	1%	4%	34
11–12 Oct	YouGov	The Times	GB	1,675	23%	51%	9%	5%	7%	3%	1%	2%	28
5–12 Oct	Ipsos	Evening Standard	GB	1,001	26%	47%	10%	4%	8%	2%	0%	2%	21
9 Oct	Redfield & Wilton	N/A	GB	2,000	25%	54%	10%	3%	4%	3%	—	1%	29
7–9 Oct	Savanta ComRes	N/A	UK	2,036	23%	51%	10%	4%	4%	—	—	8%	28
6–7 Oct	YouGov	The Times	GB	1,737	22%	52%	9%	5%	6%	5%	1%	2%	30
6–7 Oct	Deltapoll	N/A	GB	1,034	26%	51%	9%	4%	4%	2%	0%	3% UKIP on 2% Plaid Cymru on 0% Other on 0%	25
6–7 Oct	Omnisis	N/A	GB	1,328	24%	51%	10%	3%	5%	4%	1%	2%	27
5–7 Oct	Opinium	The Observer	UK	2,023	26%	47%	11%	3%	6%	—	—	6%	21
6 Oct	PeoplePolling	GB News	GB	1,512	20%	52%	8%	5%	7%	4%	1%	3%	32
5–6 Oct	Techne	N/A	UK	1,636	26%	48%	10%	4%	6%	—	—	6%	22
5 Oct	Redfield & Wilton	N/A	GB	1,500	24%	52%	10%	4%	5%	3%	—	1%	28
2 Oct	Redfield & Wilton	N/A	GB	2,000	24%	52%	10%	5%	5%	3%	—	1%	28
30 Sep – 2 Oct	Savanta ComRes	N/A	UK	2,113	25%	50%	11%	3%	3%	—	—	8%	25
29–30 Sep	Omnisis	N/A	GB	1,320	23%	55%	7%	5%	5%	3%	0%	1%	32
28–30 Sep	Opinium	The Observer	UK	1,468	27%	46%	9%	4%	6%	—	1%	6%	19
29 Sep	Survation	N/A	UK	1,329	28%	49%	11%	5%	1%	2%	1%	4% UKIP on 1% Other on 3%	21
28–29 Sep	PeoplePolling	GB News	GB	2,216	20%	50%	9%	5%	8%	3%	0%	4%	30
28–29 Sep	Techne	N/A	UK	1,625	27%	47%	11%	4%	6%	—	—	5%	20
28–29 Sep	YouGov	The Times	GB	1,712	21%	54%	7%	5%	6%	4%	1%	2%	33
28–29 Sep	Redfield & Wilton	N/A	GB	2,500	29%	46%	13%	3%	4%	4%	—	1%	17
27–29 Sep	BMG	N/A	GB	1,516	30%	47%	9%	4%	5%	3%	—	2%	17
27–29 Sep	Deltapoll	Daily Mirror	GB	1,613	29%	48%	9%	4%	4%	2%	1%	2% UKIP on 1% Other on 1%	19
23–27 Sep	FindOutNow	Channel 4	GB	10,435	27%	45%	10%	5%	7%	3%	1%	2%	18
23–26 Sep	Omnisis	N/A	GB	1,307	32%	44%	10%	4%	5%	4%	1%	1%	12
22–26 Sep	Kantar Public	N/A	GB	1,141	35%	39%	10%	5%	4%	3%	1%	3% UKIP on 2% Other on 1%	4
25 Sep	Redfield & Wilton	N/A	GB	2,000	31%	44%	11%	4%	6%	2%	—	1%	13
23–25 Sep	Savanta ComRes	MHP	UK	2,259	29%	43%	12%	5%	4%	—	—	8%	14
23–25 Sep	YouGov	The Times	GB	1,730	28%	45%	9%	4%	7%	3%	1%	2%	17
22–25 Sep	Deltapoll	N/A	GB	2,192	31%	44%	12%	4%	4%	2%	1%	1% UKIP on 1% Other on 0%	13
21–23 Sep	Opinium	N/A	UK	1,491	34%	39%	10%	4%	7%	—	1%	5%	5
21–22 Sep	YouGov	The Times	GB	1,713	32%	40%	9%	5%	8%	3%	1%	2%	8
21–22 Sep	Techne	N/A	UK	1,639	34%	41%	11%	4%	5%	—	—	5%	7
21 Sep	Redfield & Wilton	N/A	GB	2,000	32%	42%	12%	4%	5%	4%	—	2%	10
21 Sep	PeoplePolling	GB News	GB	1,298	28%	40%	10%	6%	8%	4%	1%	4%	12
16–20 Sep	Deltapoll	N/A	GB	2,084	32%	42%	10%	4%	6%	2%	1%	3% UKIP on 2% Other on 1%	10
18 Sep	Redfield & Wilton	N/A	GB	2,000	34%	42%	10%	4%	5%	3%	—	1%	8
15–16 Sep	Savanta ComRes	Labour List	UK	6,226	33%	45%	10%	?	4%	3%	—	5%	12
14–15 Sep	Techne	N/A	UK	1,647	35%	41%	10%	4%	5%	—	—	5%	6
7–15 Sep	Ipsos	N/A	GB	1,000	30%	40%	13%	5% (Note: Includes Plaid Cymru.)	8%	1%	—	4%	10
13 Sep	PeoplePolling	GB News	GB	1,245	28%	40%	10%	4%	6%	5%	2%	4%	12
11–12 Sep	YouGov	The Times	GB	1,727	32%	42%	10%	4%	7%	2%	1%	1%	10
9–12 Sep	Deltapoll	N/A	GB	1,573	32%	44%	9%	4%	4%	2%	1%	2% UKIP on 2% Other on 0%	12
11 Sep	Savanta ComRes	Daily Mail	UK	2,272	35%	42%	10%	4%	3%	3%	1%	4%	7
7–8 Sep	Techne	N/A	UK	1,628	34%	42%	11%	4%	4%	—	—	5%	8
7 Sep	PeoplePolling	GB News	GB	1,162	28%	40%	9%	5%	7%	4%	1%	5%	12
7 Sep	Redfield & Wilton	N/A	GB	2,000	30%	42%	14%	5%	6%	2%	—	2%	12
6–7 Sep	YouGov	The Times	GB	1,688	29%	44%	10%	5%	7%	3%	1%	2%	15
5–6 Sep	Liz Truss is elected leader of the Conservative Party and subsequently becomes Prime Minister												
4 Sep	Redfield & Wilton	N/A	GB	2,000	31%	43%	12%	5%	6%	3%	—	1%	12
1–2 Sep	Opinium	The Observer	UK	1,516	34%	38%	12%	4%	6%	—	1%	6%	4
1–2 Sep	Techne	N/A	UK	1,628	32%	42%	12%	4%	5%	—	—	5%	10
31 Aug – 2 Sep	Deltapoll	N/A	GB	1,573	31%	42%	10%	5%	6%	3%	1%	3% UKIP on 2% Other on 1%	11
31 Aug – 1 Sep	YouGov	The Times	GB	1,711	28%	43%	11%	5%	6%	3%	1%	1%	15
31 Aug	Survation (Note: Survation also polled voting intention if Liz Truss were Prime Minister, which saw Labour on 46%, the Conservatives on 29%, Liberal Democrats on 11% and others on 12%.)	N/A	UK	1,013	33%	43%	11%	4%	3%	5%	1%	4% UKIP on 1% Reclaim Party on 0% Alba Party on 0% Other on 3%	10
31 Aug	Redfield & Wilton	N/A	GB	2,000	31%	42%	12%	4%	7%	3%	—	2%	11
30 Aug	PeoplePolling	GB News	GB	1,203	25%	42%	10%	5%	7%	4%	2%	6%	17
26–30 Aug	Deltapoll	The Mirror	GB	1,600	31%	44%	12%	4%	4%	2%	1%	2% UKIP on 1% Other on 1%	13
28 Aug	Redfield & Wilton	N/A	GB	2,000	33%	42%	13%	3%	4%	4%	0%	1%	9
24–25 Aug	Techne	N/A	UK	1,630	33%	41%	11%	4%	6%	—	—	5%	8
24–25 Aug	Redfield & Wilton	N/A	GB	1,500	33%	42%	12%	4%	5%	2%	1%	1%	9
23–24 Aug	YouGov	The Times	GB	2,007	31%	39%	11%	5%	7%	5%	1%	2%	8
22 Aug	PeoplePolling	GB News	GB	1,235	26%	40%	11%	6%	6%	5%	1%	5%	14
19–22 Aug	Deltapoll	N/A	GB	1,591	31%	43%	11%	5%	6%	2%	1%	1%	12
18–22 Aug	Kantar Public	N/A	GB	1,106	33%	40%	14%	4%	6%	2%	1%	1% UKIP on <1% Other on 1%	7
21 Aug	Redfield & Wilton	N/A	GB	2,000	31%	43%	13%	5%	5%	3%	1%	1%	12
18–19 Aug	Opinium	The Observer	UK	1,527	31%	39%	10%	3%	7%	—	1%	8%	8
16–18 Aug	BMG	N/A	UK	2,091	32%	42%	11%	5%	4%	3%	0%	1%	10
16–17 Aug	YouGov	The Times	GB	1,696	28%	43%	11%	5%	7%	4%	1%	2%	15
14 Aug	Redfield & Wilton	N/A	GB	2,000	34%	41%	12%	4%	5%	3%	1%	1%	7
10–12 Aug	Techne	N/A	UK	1,641	35%	39%	12%	4%	5%	—	—	5%	4
9–10 Aug	YouGov	The Times	GB	1,809	30%	39%	12%	5%	6%	4%	1%	2%	9
8 Aug	Redfield & Wilton	N/A	GB	2,000	35%	40%	12%	4%	5%	3%	1%	1%	5
3–8 Aug	Opinium	The Observer	GB	2,010	34%	37%	12%	4%	6%	—	1%	7%	3
4–5 Aug	YouGov	The Times	GB	1,968	33%	37%	11%	5%	8%	3%	1%	2%	4
4 Aug	Redfield & Wilton	N/A	GB	1,500	32%	40%	13%	4%	4%	4%	1%	2%	8
3–4 Aug	Techne	N/A	UK	1,630	34%	39%	13%	4%	5%	—	—	5%	5
28 Jul – 1 Aug	Kantar Public	N/A	GB	1,096	32%	36%	13%	6%	8%	4%	<1%	2% UKIP on 1% Other on 1%	4
31 Jul	Redfield & Wilton	N/A	GB	2,000	34%	38%	11%	4%	7%	4%	0%	1%	4
27–28 Jul	YouGov	The Times	GB	1,797	34%	35%	13%	5%	7%	3%	1%	1%	1
27–28 Jul	Techne	N/A	UK	1,645	33%	40%	12%	4%	6%	—	—	5%	7
27 Jul	Redfield & Wilton	N/A	GB	1,500	33%	41%	11%	4%	5%	4%	—	2%	8
21–27 Jul	Ipsos	Evening Standard	GB	1,052	30%	44%	10%	5%	8%	1%	0%	2% UKIP on 1% Other on 1%	14
24 Jul	Redfield & Wilton	N/A	GB	2,000	34%	40%	12%	4%	5%	3%	0%	2%	6
22–24 Jul	Savanta ComRes	The Independent	UK	2,272	29%	42%	12%	3%	4%	4%	—	5%	13
21–23 Jul	Deltapoll	Mail on Sunday	GB	1,588	31%	42%	10%	4%	6%	3%	1%	4% UKIP on 3% Other on 1%	11
21–22 Jul	YouGov	The Times	GB	1,692	32%	39%	12%	4%	8%	4%	1%	2%	7
21–22 Jul	Opinium	The Observer	GB	2,001	34%	37%	13%	3%	7%	—	1%	6%	3
21 Jul	Techne	N/A	UK	1,645	32%	41%	12%	4%	6%	—	—	5%	9
21 Jul	Savanta ComRes	Daily Express	UK	2,109	33%	44%	9%	3%	3%	3%	0%	5%	11
20–21 Jul	Redfield & Wilton	N/A	GB	1,500	35%	44%	9%	3%	5%	3%	—	1%	9
14–18 Jul	Kantar Public	N/A	GB	1,077	33%	37%	13%	4%	7%	4%	1%	2% UKIP on 1% Other on <1%	4
17 Jul	Redfield & Wilton	N/A	GB	2,000	32%	42%	12%	4%	5%	3%	0%	2%	10
15–17 Jul	Savanta ComRes	N/A	UK	1,980	30%	43%	11%	4%	4%	3%	1%	4%	13
14 Jul	Techne	N/A	UK	1,645	31%	40%	13%	4%	6%	—	—	6%	9
13–14 Jul	YouGov	The Times	GB	1,733	29%	40%	13%	4%	7%	4%	1%	2%	11
12–14 Jul	JL Partners	The Sunday Telegraph	GB	4,434	31%	42%	12%	4%	6%	3%	1%	2% UKIP on 1% Other on 1%	11
11–12 Jul	Omnisis	The Byline Times	UK	1,002	25%	46%	8%	5%	8%	5%	1%	2%	21
10 Jul	Redfield & Wilton	N/A	GB	2,000	31%	42%	12%	4%	5%	5%	0%	1%	11
8–10 Jul	Savanta ComRes	N/A	UK	2,168	28%	43%	12%	4%	4%	3%	1%	6%	15
6–8 Jul	Opinium	The Observer	GB	2,000	33%	38%	12%	3%	6%	—	1%	7%	5
7 Jul	Techne	N/A	UK	1,644	29%	41%	14%	4%	6%	—	—	6%	12
7 Jul	Redfield & Wilton	N/A	GB	1,500	31%	43%	12%	3%	7%	2%	—	3%	12
6–7 Jul	YouGov	The Times	GB	1,687	29%	40%	15%	5%	6%	3%	1%	2%	11
7 Jul	Boris Johnson announces his resignation as leader of the Conservative Party and Prime Minister, triggering a leadership election												
3 Jul	Redfield & Wilton	N/A	GB	2,000	35%	41%	11%	3%	5%	5%	0%	1%	6
1–3 Jul	Savanta ComRes	N/A	UK	2,106	32%	41%	11%	4%	3%	4%	1%	5%	9
29 Jun – 1 Jul	Omnisis	The Byline Times	UK	1,015	27%	47%	9%	4%	6%	4%	1%	2%	20
28 Jun – 1 Jul	BMG	The Independent	UK	1,521	32%	42%	11%	4%	4%	4%	1%	2%	10
29–30 Jun	Techne	N/A	UK	1,632	33%	39%	13%	4%	5%	—	—	6%	6
29–30 Jun	Redfield & Wilton	N/A	GB	1,500	32%	40%	13%	5%	5%	3%	0%	1%	8
28–29 Jun	YouGov	The Times	GB	1,671	33%	36%	13%	5%	6%	3%	1%	2%	3
22–29 Jun	Ipsos	N/A	GB	1,059	30%	41%	15%	5%	6%	1%	1%	1% UKIP on 0% Other on 1%	11
27 Jun	Survation	N/A	UK	1,017	35%	43%	11%	3%	2%	—	—	5%	8
26 Jun	Redfield & Wilton	N/A	GB	2,000	33%	41%	15%	4%	4%	3%	0%	1%	8
24–26 Jun	Savanta ComRes	The Independent	UK	2,217	34%	41%	10%	5%	5%	1%	0%	4%	7
22–24 Jun	Opinium	The Observer	GB	2,000	34%	37%	11%	4%	6%	—	1%	7%	3
23 Jun	Tiverton and Honiton by-election (LD gain from Con) and Wakefield by-election (Lab gain from Con)												
22–23 Jun	YouGov	The Times	GB	1,671	34%	39%	9%	4%	8%	4%	1%	2%	5
22–23 Jun	Techne	N/A	UK	1,630	32%	38%	14%	4%	6%	—	—	6%	6
22 Jun	Redfield & Wilton	N/A	GB	2,000	32%	41%	13%	4%	5%	4%	0%	2%	9
16–20 Jun	Kantar Public	N/A	GB	1,141	34%	36%	13%	4%	5%	4%	1%	3% UKIP on 2% Other on 1%	2
19 Jun	Redfield & Wilton	N/A	GB	2,000	33%	40%	13%	4%	5%	5%	0%	1%	7
17–19 Jun	Savanta ComRes	N/A	UK	2,050	31%	42%	10%	4%	5%	3%	1%	3%	11
15–16 Jun	Techne	N/A	UK	1,612	33%	39%	13%	4%	5%	—	—	6%	6
15–16 Jun	YouGov	The Times	GB	1,727	33%	39%	10%	4%	6%	4%	1%	1%	6
15 Jun	Redfield & Wilton	N/A	GB	2,000	34%	42%	12%	3%	4%	3%	0%	1%	8
12 Jun	Redfield & Wilton	N/A	GB	2,000	32%	39%	15%	5%	6%	2%	1%	2%	7
10–12 Jun	Savanta ComRes	N/A	UK	2,237	34%	40%	10%	4%	4%	2%	1%	5%	6
10 Jun	Survation	N/A	UK	2,053	34%	41%	10%	4%	3%	—	—	7%	7
10 Jun	Techne	N/A	UK	1,632	33%	39%	12%	4%	6%	—	—	6%	6
8–10 Jun	Opinium	The Observer	GB	2,002	34%	36%	13%	3%	6%	—	1%	7%	2
8–9 Jun	YouGov	The Times	GB	1,727	32%	39%	11%	5%	7%	3%	1%	2%	7
8–9 Jun	Redfield & Wilton	N/A	GB	2,000	32%	40%	13%	4%	5%	4%	0%	2%	8
5 Jun	Redfield & Wilton	N/A	GB	2,000	34%	38%	11%	4%	7%	4%	1%	2%	4
1–3 Jun	YouGov	The Times	GB	2,000	32%	36%	12%	5%	8%	4%	1%	1%	4
1 Jun	Redfield & Wilton	N/A	GB	2,000	33%	39%	12%	4%	6%	4%	—	1%	6
31 May – 1 Jun	Techne	N/A	UK	1,632	32%	40%	12%	4%	6%	—	—	6%	8
30–31 May	Omnisis	The Byline Times	UK	1,026	25%	48%	9%	4%	6%	5%	1%	3%	23
29 May	Redfield & Wilton	N/A	GB	2,000	36%	43%	10%	3%	5%	3%	—	2%	7
27–29 May	Savanta ComRes	N/A	UK	2,177	31%	42%	11%	4%	3%	3%	1%	4%	11
25–27 May	Opinium	The Observer	GB	2,000	33%	36%	11%	4%	8%	—	1%	8%	3
25–26 May	Omnisis	The Byline Times	UK	1,026	29%	44%	8%	4%	5%	5%	1%	3%	15
25–26 May	Techne	N/A	UK	1,629	33%	40%	11%	4%	6%	—	—	6%	7
25 May	Redfield & Wilton	N/A	GB	1,500	31%	40%	14%	4%	5%	3%	—	2%	9
24–25 May	YouGov	The Times	GB	1,755	31%	39%	12%	4%	7%	4%	1%	2%	8
19–23 May	Kantar Public	N/A	GB	1,087	32%	38%	13%	3%	8%	3%	1%	2% UKIP on 1% Other on 1%	6
22 May	Redfield & Wilton	N/A	GB	2,000	33%	39%	12%	4%	5%	4%	1%	1%	6
18–19 May	Savanta ComRes	Daily Mail	UK	2,021	34%	40%	10%	4%	4%	2%	1%	5%	6
18–19 May	Techne	N/A	UK	1,635	35%	39%	10%	4%	6%	—	—	6%	4
18–19 May	YouGov	The Times	GB	1,692	31%	39%	12%	5%	7%	4%	1%	1%	8
18 May	Redfield & Wilton	N/A	GB	1,500	33%	39%	12%	4%	4%	5%	1%	2%	6
11–17 May	Ipsos	N/A	GB	1,013	33%	39%	12%	5%	5%	1%	1%	3% UKIP on 1% Other on 2%	6
15 May	Redfield & Wilton	N/A	GB	2,000	35%	39%	12%	4%	6%	3%	1%	4%	4
13–15 May	Savanta ComRes	N/A	UK	2,196	34%	41%	10%	4%	4%	2%	1%	4%	7
11–13 May	Opinium	The Observer	GB	2,000	34%	37%	12%	4%	7%	—	1%	6%	3
11–12 May	Techne	N/A	UK	1,634	34%	39%	11%	4%	6%	—	—	6%	5
10–11 May	YouGov	The Times	GB	1,990	33%	38%	12%	4%	6%	3%	1%	2%	5
8 May	Redfield & Wilton	N/A	GB	2,000	33%	39%	12%	5%	7%	2%	—	1%	6
6–8 May	Savanta ComRes	N/A	UK	2,161	34%	39%	11%	4%	3%	3%	1%	4%	5
5–6 May	YouGov	The Times	GB	1,707	35%	36%	10%	5%	8%	3%	1%	2%	1
5 May	Local elections in England, Scotland and Wales; Northern Ireland Assembly election												
4–5 May	Techne	N/A	UK	1,635	34%	40%	10%	4%	5%	—	—	7%	6
1 May	Redfield & Wilton	N/A	GB	2,000	33%	41%	12%	4%	5%	3%	1%	3%	8
28 Apr – 1 May	Savanta ComRes	N/A	UK	2,236	35%	41%	9%	4%	4%	3%	0%	4%	6
27–28 Apr	Techne	N/A	UK	1,633	35%	40%	9%	4%	6%	—	—	6%	5
20–28 Apr	Ipsos	N/A	GB	1,006	35%	40%	10%	5%	7%	1%	—	2% UKIP on 1% Other on 1%	5
26–27 Apr	YouGov	The Times	GB	1,779	33%	39%	11%	5%	6%	3%	0%	2%	6
22–26 Apr	Survation	N/A	UK	2,587	33%	42%	9%	4%	4%	2%	1%	4%	9
14–26 Apr	Opinium	N/A	GB	4,000	35%	37%	10%	—	7%	—	—	—	2
24 Apr	Redfield & Wilton	N/A	GB	2,000	34%	42%	11%	4%	4%	4%	1%	1%	8
22–24 Apr	Savanta ComRes	N/A	UK	2,231	34%	40%	11%	4%	3%	3%	1%	4%	6
20–22 Apr	Opinium	The Observer	GB	2,002	34%	36%	10%	4%	8%	—	1%	7%	2
20–21 Apr	Techne	N/A	UK	1,631	34%	40%	10%	4%	5%	—	—	7%	6
19–20 Apr	YouGov	The Times	GB	2,079	33%	39%	9%	4%	8%	3%	1%	3%	6
17 Apr	Redfield & Wilton	N/A	GB	2,000	34%	42%	10%	5%	5%	3%	0%	1%	8
13–14 Apr	Deltapoll	Mail on Sunday	GB	1,550	32%	43%	9%	5%	6%	2%	1%	3% UKIP on 2% Other on 1%	11
13–14 Apr	YouGov	The Times	GB	1,960	33%	38%	10%	4%	7%	5%	1%	2%	5
12–13 Apr	Techne	N/A	UK	1,628	34%	41%	9%	4%	5%	—	—	7%	7
7–11 Apr	Kantar Public	N/A	GB	1,152	34%	37%	11%	5%	7%	4%	1%	3% UKIP on 2% Other on 1%	3
10 Apr	Redfield & Wilton	N/A	GB	2,000	34%	42%	8%	4%	5%	4%	1%	2%	8
8–10 Apr	Savanta ComRes	N/A	UK	2,145	34%	40%	9%	4%	4%	3%	0%	4%	6
6–8 Apr	Omnisis	The Byline Times	UK	918	25%	49%	6%	4%	6%	3%	1%	4%	24
6–8 Apr	Opinium	The Observer	GB	2,004	34%	38%	10%	4%	7%	—	1%	7%	4
6–7 Apr	Techne	N/A	UK	1,635	35%	40%	10%	4%	4%	—	—	7%	5
6–7 Apr	YouGov	The Times	GB	1,826	34%	37%	10%	4%	7%	4%	1%	3%	3
3 Apr	Redfield & Wilton	N/A	GB	2,000	36%	42%	9%	3%	4%	3%	1%	2%	6
1–3 Apr	Savanta ComRes	N/A	UK	2,220	33%	40%	11%	5%	4%	3%	1%	4%	7
30–31 Mar	Techne	N/A	UK	1,639	36%	39%	9%	5%	5%	—	—	6%	3
29–30 Mar	YouGov	The Times	GB	2,006	33%	37%	9%	6%	6%	5%	1%	3%	4
28–30 Mar	Survation	N/A	UK	2,033	35%	42%	9%	4%	3%	2%	1%	5%	7
27 Mar	Redfield & Wilton	N/A	GB	2,000	35%	37%	9%	6%	5%	5%	1%	2%	2
25–27 Mar	Savanta ComRes	N/A	GB	2,226	35%	39%	11%	5%	3%	3%	0%	4%	4
23–25 Mar	Opinium	The Observer	GB	2,002	36%	38%	9%	4%	7%	—	1%	6%	2
23–24 Mar	YouGov	The Times	GB	1,759	35%	37%	10%	4%	7%	4%	1%	2%	2
23–24 Mar	Techne	N/A	UK	1,641	35%	40%	10%	4%	5%	—	—	6%	5
22–23 Mar	YouGov	The Times	GB	1,810	35%	36%	9%	4%	8%	5%	1%	3%	1
17–21 Mar	Kantar Public	N/A	GB	1,042	36%	36%	12%	3%	6%	3%	<1%	3% UKIP on 1% Other on 2%	Tie
20 Mar	Redfield & Wilton	N/A	GB	2,000	35%	40%	11%	4%	7%	2%	0%	1%	5
16–17 Mar	Techne	N/A	UK	1,636	35%	39%	10%	4%	6%	—	—	6%	4
16–17 Mar	YouGov	The Times	GB	1,761	33%	39%	10%	5%	7%	4%	1%	2%	6
9–16 Mar	Ipsos	Evening Standard	GB	1,000	35%	39%	10%	5%	7%	—	—	5%	4
13 Mar	Redfield & Wilton	N/A	GB	2,000	36%	39%	10%	4%	6%	4%	1%	2%	3
11–13 Mar	Savanta ComRes	N/A	UK	2,192	35%	40%	9%	4%	3%	3%	1%	4%	5
9–11 Mar	Opinium	The Observer	GB	2,007	35%	37%	9%	4%	7%	—	1%	7%	2
8–11 Mar	Deltapoll	N/A	GB	2,003	34%	40%	10%	5%	5%	2%	1%	2% UKIP on 1% Other on 1%	6
9–10 Mar	Techne	N/A	UK	1,641	36%	38%	9%	4%	6%	—	—	7%	2
8–9 Mar	YouGov	The Times	GB	1,700	33%	39%	10%	4%	7%	4%	1%	2%	6
7 Mar	Redfield & Wilton	N/A	GB	2,000	37%	40%	10%	4%	5%	2%	0%	1%	3
4–7 Mar	Survation	38 Degrees	GB	2,034	37%	40%	9%	5%	5%	—	1%	4%	3
4–6 Mar	Savanta ComRes	N/A	UK	2,222	34%	41%	9%	5%	4%	3%	1%	5%	7
3–4 Mar	YouGov	The Times	GB	1,658	35%	37%	7%	5%	8%	5%	1%	2%	2
3 Mar	Birmingham Erdington by-election (Lab hold)												
2–3 Mar	Techne	N/A	UK	1,631	35%	38%	10%	4%	6%	—	—	7%	3
28 Feb	Redfield & Wilton	N/A	GB	2,000	35%	38%	12%	5%	5%	4%	0%	1%	3
21–28 Feb	Number Cruncher Politics	ITV	UK	2,001	35%	42%	8%	5%	6%	2%	1%	2%	7
25–27 Feb	Savanta ComRes	N/A	UK	2,208	34%	42%	9%	4%	3%	3%	1%	4%	8
24–25 Feb	YouGov	The Times	GB	1,741	34%	39%	9%	5%	6%	5%	1%	3%	5
23–25 Feb	Opinium	The Observer	GB	2,068	34%	38%	11%	4%	6%	—	1%	5%	4
23–24 Feb	Techne	N/A	UK	1,635	35%	39%	9%	4%	6%	—	—	7%	4
22–23 Feb	Omnisis	The Byline Times	UK	1,004	27%	46%	8%	5%	7%	4%	1%	3%	19
21 Feb	Redfield & Wilton	N/A	GB	2,000	33%	39%	11%	5%	7%	4%	1%	1%	6
17–21 Feb	Kantar Public	N/A	GB	1,090	34%	39%	12%	4%	6%	2%	<1%	3% UK Independence Party on 1% Other on 2%	5
17–21 Feb	Survation	N/A	UK	2,050	35%	42%	9%	4%	3%	2%	1%	4% UKIP on 0% Other on 4%	7
18–20 Feb	Savanta ComRes	The Independent	UK	2,201	33%	40%	11%	4%	5%	3%	0%	4%	7
14–18 Feb	FindOutNow	N/A	GB	12,700	32%	38%	13%	5%	7%	4%	1%	2%	6
16–17 Feb	Techne	N/A	UK	1,625	34%	39%	10%	4%	6%	—	—	7%	5
16–17 Feb	YouGov	The Times	GB	1,720	34%	38%	10%	4%	6%	4%	1%	2%	4
14 Feb	Redfield & Wilton	N/A	GB	2,000	33%	38%	11%	4%	6%	5%	1%	2%	5
11–13 Feb	Savanta ComRes	N/A	UK	2,226	32%	41%	11%	4%	4%	3%	1%	4%	9
10–11 Feb	YouGov	The Times	GB	1,720	34%	37%	10%	5%	8%	4%	1%	2%	3
9–11 Feb	Opinium (Note: Opinium announced they had amended their methodology, so it cannot be compared directly to previous Opinium polls.)	The Observer	GB	1,526	34%	37%	11%	3%	6%	—	1%	8%	3
8–9 Feb	Techne	N/A	UK	1,631	33%	41%	9%	4%	6%	—	—	7%	8
7 Feb	Redfield & Wilton	N/A	GB	2,000	32%	42%	9%	4%	6%	4%	1%	2%	10
4–6 Feb	Savanta ComRes	N/A	UK	2,232	33%	42%	9%	4%	5%	3%	1%	4%	9
3–4 Feb	Deltapoll	The Sun on Sunday	GB	1,587	34%	41%	10%	4%	5%	2%	1%	3% UKIP on 2% Other on 1%	7
3 Feb	Southend West by-election (Con hold, unopposed by major parties)												
1–2 Feb	Techne	N/A	UK	1,631	32%	40%	10%	4%	6%	—	—	8%	8
1–2 Feb	YouGov	The Times	GB	1,661	32%	41%	10%	5%	6%	4%	1%	2%	9
31 Jan	Redfield & Wilton	N/A	GB	2,000	33%	40%	11%	4%	6%	3%	1%	1%	7
28–30 Jan	Savanta ComRes	N/A	UK	2,283	33%	44%	9%	4%	3%	3%	1%	4%	11
28 Jan	Techne	N/A	UK	—	31%	38%	12%	4%	6%	2%	—	7%	7
27–28 Jan	Opinium	The Observer	GB	1,647	34%	39%	9%	5%	5%	—	1%	6%	5
26–27 Jan	Omnisis	The Byline Times	UK	1,005	28%	48%	7%	5%	6%	4%	0%	1%	20
26–27 Jan	YouGov	The Times	GB	1,656	32%	38%	11%	5%	7%	3%	1%	3%	6
25–27 Jan	Deltapoll	Daily Mirror	GB	1,515	32%	42%	10%	5%	6%	1%	1%	2% UKIP on 1% Other on 1%	10
25 Jan	Survation	Daily Mail	UK	1,117	35%	40%	10%	5%	3%	3%	1%	3% UKIP on 0% Other on 3%	5
19–25 Jan	Ipsos	Evening Standard	GB	1,059	31%	40%	13%	4%	9%	1%	1%	1%	9
24 Jan	Redfield & Wilton	N/A	GB	2,000	34%	41%	11%	5%	5%	3%	0%	1%	7
20–24 Jan	Kantar Public	N/A	GB	1,086	34%	38%	11%	5%	7%	2%	1%	2% UK Independence Party on 1% Other on 1%	4
21–23 Jan	Savanta ComRes	N/A	UK	2,095	32%	40%	11%	5%	4%	3%	1%	4%	8
11–23 Jan	JL Partners	Sunday Times	GB	4,561	32%	42%	10%	5%	7%	2%	0%	2% UKIP on 1% BNP on 0% Other on 1%	10
20–21 Jan	YouGov	The Times	GB	1,668	32%	39%	8%	5%	8%	4%	1%	2%	7
20–20 Jan	Omnisis	The Byline Times	UK	1,015	27%	45%	8%	5%	7%	4%	1%	3%	18
17 Jan	Redfield & Wilton	N/A	GB	2,000	30%	43%	9%	4%	7%	4%	1%	2%	13
14–17 Jan	Survation	38 Degrees	UK	2,036	33%	43%	10%	4%	3%	2%	1%	4% DUP on 1% Alliance on 1% UKIP on 1% Other on 1%	10
14–16 Jan	Savanta ComRes	N/A	GB	2,151	32%	41%	11%	5%	4%	3%	1%	4%	9
12–16 Jan	Deltapoll	N/A	GB	4,292	32%	41%	11%	5%	5%	2%	1%	3% UKIP on 2% Other on 1%	9
13–14 Jan	Savanta ComRes	N/A	GB	2,151	32%	42%	11%	4%	4%	2%	1%	4%	10
13–14 Jan	YouGov	The Times	GB	1,683	31%	39%	11%	5%	6%	5%	1%	2%	8
12–14 Jan	Opinium	The Observer	UK	1,271	31%	41%	9%	4%	6%	—	1%	8%	10
13 Jan	FindOutNow/Electoral Calculus	N/A	GB	2,128	27%	41%	11%	5%	8%	5%	1%	2%	14
12–13 Jan	YouGov	The Times	GB	1,690	29%	40%	11%	5%	6%	6%	—	1%	11
12–13 Jan	Focaldata	N/A	GB	1,003	33%	42%	11%	3%	4%	3%	1%	2%	9
11–12 Jan	YouGov	The Times	GB	1,666	28%	38%	13%	5%	7%	4%	—	3%	10
10 Jan	Redfield & Wilton	N/A	GB	2,000	35%	39%	12%	4%	5%	4%	0%	1%	4
7–9 Jan	Savanta ComRes	N/A	GB	2,207	33%	37%	11%	5%	4%	4%	1%	5%	4
6–7 Jan	YouGov	The Times	GB	1,744	33%	37%	10%	5%	6%	5%	1%	3%	4
5–7 Jan	Opinium	The Observer	UK	1,326	34%	39%	11%	4%	5%	—	1%	6%	5
3 Jan	Redfield & Wilton	N/A	GB	2,000	35%	38%	10%	5%	5%	4%	0%	2%	3

=== 2021 ===
Dates conducted	Pollster	Client	Area	Sample size	Con	Lab	LD	SNP	Grn	Ref	PC	Others	Lead
23–30 Dec	Deltapoll	The Mail on Sunday	GB	1,567	35%	40%	10%	5%	4%	3%	1%	1% UKIP on 1% Other on 0%	5
28 Dec	Techne	N/A	UK	TBA	32%	37%	11%	4%	4%	—	—	12%	5
21–23 Dec	Opinium	The Observer	UK	1,216	32%	39%	11%	5%	6%	—	1%	7%	7
20–21 Dec	Focaldata	N/A	GB	1,008	34%	41%	9%	4%	4%	4%	0%	2%	7
1–21 Dec	Focaldata	The Times	GB	24,373	32%	40%	10%	3%	7%	6%	1%	2%	8
20 Dec	Redfield & Wilton	N/A	GB	2,000	31%	39%	13%	5%	6%	5%	1%	1%	8
19–20 Dec	YouGov	The Times	GB	1,790	30%	36%	12%	6%	8%	5%	1%	3%	6
17–19 Dec	Savanta ComRes	N/A	UK	2,096	32%	37%	13%	4%	5%	4%	1%	4%	5
16 Dec	North Shropshire by-election (LD gain from Con)												
16 Dec	Savanta ComRes	The Daily Express	UK	2,139	34%	38%	10%	5%	4%	4%	1%	4%	4
14–15 Dec	FindOutNow/Electoral Calculus	The Telegraph	GB	1,017	30%	38%	10%	2%	10%	7%	1%	2%	8
14–15 Dec	YouGov	The Times	GB	1,714	32%	37%	10%	5%	7%	6%	1%	3%	5
13–14 Dec	Survation	38 Degrees	UK	2,039	34%	40%	8%	5%	4%	2%	1%	3% Democratic Unionist Party on 1% UK Independence Party on 1% Other on 1%	6
13 Dec	Redfield & Wilton	N/A	GB	2,000	32%	37%	11%	4%	7%	7%	0%	1%	5
9–13 Dec	Kantar Public	N/A	GB	1,074	34%	38%	11%	3%	7%	3%	1%	4% UKIP on 2% Other on 2%	4
8–13 Dec	YouGov	Fabian Society	GB	3,380	31%	38%	8%	5%	8%	6%	1%	2%	7
10–11 Dec	Survation	GMB	UK	1,218	32%	39%	9%	5%	5%	4%	1%	5% UKIP on 1% Reclaim Party on <1% Other on 4%	7
9–10 Dec	YouGov	The Times	GB	1,741	32%	40%	8%	4%	7%	7%	1%	2%	8
9–10 Dec	Savanta ComRes	Daily Mail	UK	2,118	33%	39%	9%	5%	4%	4%	1%	5%	6
8–10 Dec	Opinium	The Observer	UK	2,042	32%	41%	9%	5%	5%	—	0%	8%	9
3–10 Dec	Ipsos	Evening Standard	GB	1,005	34%	39%	11%	5%	7%	2%	1%	3%	5
9 Dec	Focaldata	Times Radio	GB	1,001	33%	41%	7%	5%	6%	6%	1%	1%	8
8–9 Dec	YouGov	The Times	GB	1,686	33%	37%	9%	5%	7%	6%	1%	1%	4
8–9 Dec	Survation	Daily Mirror	UK	1,178	34%	40%	10%	4%	4%	3%	1%	5% UKIP on 1% Reclaim Party on 0% Other on 4%	6
8 Dec	Redfield & Wilton	N/A	GB	1,500	34%	38%	11%	4%	6%	5%	0%	1%	4
7 Dec	Partygate scandal begins												
6 Dec	Redfield & Wilton	N/A	GB	2,000	38%	36%	9%	4%	6%	4%	0%	2%	2
3–5 Dec	Savanta ComRes	N/A	UK	2,232	38%	37%	9%	4%	5%	2%	1%	4%	1
2–4 Dec	Deltapoll	N/A	GB	1,553	37%	38%	10%	5%	5%	2%	1%	2% UKIP on 2% Other on 0%	1
2 Dec	Old Bexley and Sidcup by-election (Con hold)												
1–2 Dec	YouGov	The Times	GB	1,708	36%	33%	9%	5%	9%	6%	1%	1%	3
30 Nov – 1 Dec	Survation	N/A	UK	1,060	36%	39%	9%	5%	3%	3%	1%	4% UKIP on 1% Other on 3%	3
29 Nov – 1 Dec	FindOutNow	Daily Telegraph	GB	10,272	36%	35%	11%	5%	8%	3%	1%	1%	1
29 Nov	Redfield & Wilton	N/A	GB	2,000	38%	36%	10%	4%	6%	4%	1%	1%	2
26–28 Nov	Savanta ComRes	N/A	GB	2,060	37%	37%	8%	5%	5%	4%	1%	4%	Tie
24–26 Nov	Opinium	The Observer	UK	1,990	36%	38%	8%	5%	6%	—	1%	7%	2
24–25 Nov	YouGov	The Times	GB	1,692	36%	35%	7%	5%	8%	6%	1%	2%	1
18–22 Nov	Kantar Public	N/A	GB	1,119	39%	36%	10%	4%	5%	2%	1%	3% UKIP on 2% Other on 1%	3
21 Nov	Redfield & Wilton	N/A	GB	2,000	37%	37%	9%	4%	6%	3%	1%	2%	Tie
19–21 Nov	Savanta ComRes	N/A	UK	2,184	36%	38%	10%	4%	5%	3%	1%	4%	2
10–19 Nov	Panelbase	N/A	GB	3,888	38%	39%	9%	4%	6%	—	<1%	4%	1
17–18 Nov	YouGov	The Times	GB	1,800	36%	34%	7%	4%	10%	5%	1%	3%	2
15 Nov	Redfield & Wilton	N/A	GB	2,000	36%	37%	10%	4%	5%	4%	1%	2%	1
11–15 Nov	Survation	38 Degrees	UK	3,108	37%	37%	10%	5%	4%	2%	—	5%	Tie
11–12 Nov	Savanta ComRes	Daily Mail	UK	2,019	34%	40%	10%	5%	5%	3%	1%	4%	6
10–12 Nov	Opinium	The Observer	UK	1,175	36%	37%	9%	5%	7%	—	1%	5%	1
10–11 Nov	YouGov	The Times	GB	1,696	35%	35%	8%	5%	10%	4%	1%	3%	Tie
10 Nov	Redfield & Wilton	N/A	GB	1,500	36%	38%	10%	4%	6%	3%	0%	1%	2
8 Nov	Omnisis	The Byline Times	UK	1,005	30%	42%	6%	5%	8%	5%	1%	3%	12
8 Nov	Redfield & Wilton	N/A	GB	2,000	37%	36%	10%	5%	6%	5%	0%	1%	1
5–8 Nov	FindOutNow	Daily Telegraph	GB	10,700	36%	35%	11%	4%	8%	2%	1%	3%	1
5–7 Nov	Savanta ComRes	N/A	UK	2,242	38%	35%	10%	5%	4%	3%	1%	5%	3
5–6 Nov	Opinium	The Observer	GB	1,175	37%	36%	9%	5%	6%	—	—	7% Plaid Cymru on 1% Other on 6%	1
3–5 Nov	Deltapoll	N/A	GB	1,560	40%	37%	8%	3%	6%	2%	1%	3% UKIP on 2% Other on 1%	3
4 Nov	Omnisis	The Byline Times	UK	1,004	35%	41%	5%	5%	7%	5%	1%	2%	6
3–4 Nov	YouGov	The Times	GB	1,699	36%	35%	8%	5%	9%	5%	0%	2%	1
29 Oct – 4 Nov	Ipsos	Evening Standard	GB	1,007	35%	36%	9%	5%	11%	1%	1%	2%	1
1 Nov	Redfield & Wilton	N/A	GB	2,000	40%	35%	10%	4%	6%	3%	0%	2%	5
29–31 Oct	Savanta ComRes	N/A	UK	2,242	40%	35%	9%	5%	4%	3%	1%	4%	5
27–29 Oct	Opinium	The Observer	GB	2,001	40%	35%	8%	5%	7%	—	1%	5%	5
27–28 Oct	YouGov	The Times	GB	1,699	39%	33%	8%	5%	10%	3%	1%	2%	6
25 Oct	Redfield & Wilton	N/A	GB	2,000	39%	36%	10%	4%	6%	4%	0%	1%	3
22–24 Oct	Savanta ComRes	N/A	UK	2,092	37%	35%	8%	5%	7%	4%	1%	5%	2
20–21 Oct	YouGov	The Times	GB	1,677	37%	33%	9%	5%	10%	4%	1%	2%	4
18 Oct	Redfield & Wilton	N/A	GB	2,000	40%	37%	9%	4%	5%	3%	1%	1%	3
14–18 Oct	Kantar Public	N/A	GB	1,075	39%	34%	8%	5%	8%	2%	1%	2% UKIP on 1% Other on 1%	5
11–18 Oct	Number Cruncher Politics	N/A	UK	1,000	40%	32%	6%	6%	9%	3%	1%	2%	8
15–17 Oct	Savanta ComRes	N/A	UK	2,092	40%	35%	8%	4%	5%	3%	1%	4%	5
13–15 Oct	Deltapoll	The Mail on Sunday	GB	3,043	38%	37%	9%	4%	6%	2%	1%	3% UKIP on 2% Other on 1%	1
13–15 Oct	Opinium	The Observer	GB	2,000	41%	37%	7%	5%	5%	—	1%	4%	4
12–13 Oct	YouGov	The Times	GB	1,659	41%	31%	9%	4%	8%	4%	1%	2%	10
11–12 Oct	Omnisis	The Byline Times	UK	501	37%	34%	7%	6%	8%	4%	0%	3%	3
11 Oct	Redfield & Wilton	N/A	GB	2,000	40%	36%	9%	4%	6%	4%	0%	1%	4
8–10 Oct	Savanta ComRes	N/A	UK	2,103	40%	35%	8%	5%	5%	2%	0%	5%	5
6–7 Oct	Survation	Sunday Mirror	UK	1,040	39%	35%	9%	4%	5%	3%	1%	4%	4
5–6 Oct	YouGov	The Times	GB	1,667	39%	31%	9%	6%	9%	4%	1%	2%	8
4–5 Oct	Omnisis	The Byline Times	UK	1,007	34%	39%	7%	5%	8%	4%	1%	3%	5
4 Oct	Redfield & Wilton	N/A	GB	2,000	40%	37%	10%	4%	4%	3%	0%	1%	3
1–3 Oct	Savanta ComRes	N/A	UK	2,095	40%	35%	9%	5%	4%	3%	1%	4%	5
1 Oct	Carla Denyer and Adrian Ramsay are elected co-leaders of the Green Party of England and Wales												
29 Sep – 1 Oct	Opinium	The Observer	GB	2,004	39%	35%	8%	6%	6%	—	1%	5%	4
29 Sep	Survation	N/A	UK	1,001	41%	36%	8%	5%	5%	—	0%	4%	5
28–29 Sep	YouGov	The Times	GB	1,833	39%	31%	8%	5%	9%	4%	1%	2%	8
27 Sep	Redfield & Wilton	N/A	GB	2,000	41%	35%	10%	4%	5%	3%	0%	2%	6
23–27 Sep	Kantar Public	N/A	GB	1,089	43%	30%	11%	4%	6%	3%	1%	2% UKIP on 1% Other on 1%	13
22–23 Sep	YouGov	The Times	GB	1,690	39%	32%	10%	4%	9%	3%	1%	2%	7
17–23 Sep	Ipsos	Evening Standard	GB	1,008	39%	36%	9%	6%	6%	0%	1%	2% UKIP on 0% Other on 2%	3
21–22 Sep	Survation	N/A	UK	1,060	40%	35%	8%	4%	4%	—	1%	8%	5
20 Sep	Redfield & Wilton	N/A	GB	2,000	41%	35%	8%	4%	7%	3%	0%	2%	6
17–19 Sep	Savanta ComRes	N/A	UK	2,112	40%	35%	9%	4%	5%	2%	1%	4%	5
16–17 Sep	Opinium	The Observer	GB	2,000	40%	37%	7%	5%	6%	—	1%	4%	3
15–16 Sep	YouGov	The Times	GB	1,635	39%	35%	7%	5%	7%	3%	1%	2%	4
9–16 Sep	Panelbase	N/A	GB	3,938	41%	36%	10%	4%	5%	—	1%	4%	5
10–14 Sep	Survation	N/A	UK	2,164	40%	36%	9%	4%	5%	—	1%	4%	4
13 Sep	Redfield & Wilton	N/A	GB	2,000	39%	35%	9%	4%	6%	5%	1%	2%	4
10–12 Sep	Savanta ComRes	N/A	UK	2,097	39%	35%	9%	4%	6%	3%	1%	5%	4
9–11 Sep	Opinium	The Observer	GB	2,059	38%	38%	8%	5%	6%	—	0%	5%	Tie
8–9 Sep	YouGov	The Times	GB	1,657	33%	35%	10%	5%	9%	5%	1%	2%	2
6–8 Sep	FindOutNow (MRP)	The Sunday Telegraph	GB	10,673	37%	33%	12%	5%	8%	4%	—	6%	4
4–8 Sep	Omnisis	The Byline Times	UK	993	34%	39%	9%	5%	6%	3%	1%	3%	5
6 Sep	Redfield & Wilton	N/A	GB	2,000	41%	32%	11%	4%	6%	4%	1%	2%	9
3–5 Sep	Savanta ComRes	N/A	UK	2,087	40%	36%	9%	4%	4%	3%	1%	4%	4
2–3 Sep	YouGov	The Times	GB	1,653	38%	34%	8%	5%	10%	3%	1%	3%	4
2–3 Sep	Deltapoll	The Sun on Sunday	GB	1,589	41%	33%	9%	3%	7%	3%	1%	3% UKIP on 3% Other on 0%	8
2–3 Sep	Opinium	The Observer	GB	2,014	40%	35%	7%	6%	6%	—	0%	6%	5
29 Aug	Redfield & Wilton	N/A	GB	2,000	41%	33%	9%	4%	5%	4%	1%	2%	8
27–29 Aug	Savanta ComRes	N/A	UK	2,062	40%	34%	10%	4%	5%	2%	1%	3%	6
25–26 Aug	YouGov	The Times	GB	1,703	39%	31%	8%	5%	9%	4%	1%	3%	8
23 Aug	Redfield & Wilton	N/A	GB	2,000	43%	33%	10%	3%	6%	3%	0%	1%	10
19–23 Aug	Kantar Public	N/A	GB	1,094	37%	34%	14%	4%	5%	2%	1%	3% UKIP on 2% Other on 1%	3
20–22 Aug	Savanta ComRes	N/A	UK	2,083	41%	34%	9%	4%	4%	2%	1%	4%	7
19–20 Aug	Opinium	The Observer	GB	2,003	39%	36%	8%	6%	6%	—	1%	4%	3
17–18 Aug	YouGov	The Times	GB	1,703	40%	32%	9%	5%	8%	3%	1%	3%	8
16 Aug	Redfield & Wilton	N/A	GB	2,000	40%	36%	10%	5%	5%	3%	0%	2%	4
13–15 Aug	Savanta ComRes	N/A	UK	2,075	41%	34%	9%	4%	4%	2%	1%	4%	7
11–12 Aug	YouGov	The Times	GB	2,169	40%	32%	9%	5%	7%	2%	1%	3%	8
9 Aug	Redfield & Wilton	N/A	GB	2,000	40%	37%	9%	4%	6%	3%	1%	1%	3
30 Jul – 9 Aug	Ipsos	Evening Standard	GB	1,113	41%	30%	13%	6%	8%	0%	1%	2% UKIP on 0% Other on 2%	11
6–8 Aug	Savanta ComRes	N/A	UK	2,047	41%	33%	10%	4%	4%	2%	1%	4%	8
5–6 Aug	Opinium	The Observer	GB	2,000	42%	35%	7%	6%	5%	—	1%	4%	7
5–6 Aug	YouGov	The Times	GB	1,730	41%	33%	8%	5%	7%	3%	1%	2%	8
2 Aug	Redfield & Wilton	N/A	GB	2,000	41%	34%	11%	4%	6%	3%	0%	2%	7
30 Jul – 1 Aug	Savanta ComRes	N/A	UK	2,100	40%	34%	10%	4%	6%	1%	0%	4%	6
28–29 Jul	YouGov	The Times	GB	1,637	39%	34%	8%	4%	9%	3%	1%	2%	5
23–26 Jul	Deltapoll	N/A	GB	1,590	42%	37%	6%	3%	6%	2%	1%	4% UKIP on 3% Other on 1%	5
25 Jul	Redfield & Wilton	N/A	GB	2,000	40%	36%	9%	4%	6%	4%	0%	2%	4
23–25 Jul	Savanta ComRes	N/A	UK	2,161	40%	34%	10%	4%	4%	2%	1%	4%	6
23 Jul	Survation	N/A	UK	1,013	39%	37%	10%	4%	5%	—	1%	4%	2
22–23 Jul	Opinium	The Observer	GB	2,000	43%	35%	8%	5%	5%	—	1%	3%	8
20–21 Jul	YouGov	The Times	GB	1,667	38%	34%	9%	5%	8%	3%	1%	2%	4
19–20 Jul	Survation	N/A	UK	1,032	39%	35%	11%	4%	5%	—	1%	5%	4
19 Jul	Redfield & Wilton	N/A	GB	2,000	42%	33%	10%	4%	5%	3%	0%	2%	9
16–18 Jul	Savanta ComRes	N/A	UK	2,127	41%	34%	8%	4%	5%	2%	1%	4%	7
15–16 Jul	YouGov	The Times	GB	1,761	44%	31%	8%	4%	6%	3%	1%	2%	13
5–13 Jul	Survation	N/A	UK	2,119	43%	32%	9%	5%	6%	—	1%	5%	11
12 Jul	Redfield & Wilton	N/A	GB	2,000	41%	33%	12%	4%	6%	3%	0%	1%	8
7–12 Jul	Kantar Public	N/A	GB	1,057	44%	31%	12%	6%	4%	1%	1%	2% UKIP on 1% Other on 1%	13
9–11 Jul	Savanta ComRes	N/A	UK	2,137	40%	35%	9%	4%	6%	2%	1%	4%	5
8–9 Jul	Opinium	The Observer	GB	2,001	43%	35%	6%	5%	6%	—	2%	3%	8
7–8 Jul	YouGov	The Times	GB	2,054	42%	30%	9%	5%	7%	2%	1%	3%	12
2–8 Jul	Ipsos	Evening Standard	GB	1,053	40%	31%	13%	6%	6%	0%	1%	3% UKIP on 1% Other on 2%	9
5 Jul	Redfield & Wilton	N/A	GB	2,000	43%	34%	8%	4%	6%	4%	1%	1%	9
2–4 Jul	Savanta ComRes	N/A	UK	2,176	41%	35%	8%	3%	4%	3%	1%	5%	6
18 Jun – 2 Jul	Panelbase	Sunday Times	GB	3,391	44%	33%	10%	5%	5%	—	1%	3%	11
1 Jul	Batley and Spen by-election (Lab hold)												
29–30 Jun	YouGov	The Times	GB	1,762	42%	31%	10%	5%	6%	3%	1%	2%	11
28 Jun	Redfield & Wilton	N/A	GB	2,000	41%	34%	9%	5%	5%	3%	0%	2%	7
25–27 Jun	Savanta ComRes	N/A	GB	2,148	42%	33%	9%	4%	5%	2%	1%	5%	9
25–26 Jun	Survation	N/A	UK	1,001	41%	35%	10%	3%	5%	—	—	6%	6
23–25 Jun	Opinium	The Observer	GB	2,000	43%	35%	7%	5%	5%	—	1%	4%	8
23–24 Jun	YouGov	The Times	GB	1,758	42%	30%	9%	5%	7%	4%	1%	2%	12
21 Jun	Redfield & Wilton	N/A	GB	2,000	44%	33%	10%	4%	4%	3%	1%	2%	11
18–20 Jun	Savanta ComRes	N/A	UK	2,191	44%	30%	10%	4%	5%	1%	1%	4%	14
17–20 Jun	Deltapoll	N/A	GB	2,343	41%	35%	10%	2%	5%	2%	0%	5% UKIP on 3% Other on 2%	6
17 Jun	Chesham and Amersham by-election (LD gain from Con)												
16–17 Jun	YouGov	The Times	GB	1,642	45%	31%	6%	5%	7%	4%	1%	2%	14
11–15 Jun	Survation	N/A	UK	2,024	41%	33%	8%	4%	7%	—	—	6%	9
7–14 Jun	Number Cruncher Politics	N/A	UK	1,517	45%	34%	5%	5%	7%	3%	1%	1%	11
13 Jun	Redfield & Wilton	N/A	GB	2,000	44%	34%	9%	4%	5%	2%	0%	1%	10
11–13 Jun	Savanta ComRes	N/A	UK	2,108	41%	34%	8%	5%	6%	2%	1%	4%	7
10–12 Jun	Deltapoll	The Mail on Sunday	GB	1,608	46%	34%	7%	2%	5%	2%	1%	3% UKIP on 3% Other on 0%	12
10–11 Jun	Opinium	The Observer	GB	2,002	43%	34%	6%	6%	7%	—	1%	4%	9
9–10 Jun	YouGov	The Times	GB	1,630	44%	31%	7%	5%	9%	2%	1%	2%	13
9–10 Jun	Survation	N/A	UK	2,017	42%	35%	9%	4%	5%	—	—	5%	7
7 Jun	Redfield & Wilton	N/A	GB	2,000	43%	36%	7%	5%	5%	1%	0%	2%	7
3–7 Jun	Kantar Public	N/A	GB	1,122	45%	32%	8%	4%	6%	2%	1%	2% UKIP on 1% Other on 1%	13
4–6 Jun	Savanta ComRes	N/A	UK	2,089	44%	32%	8%	4%	5%	2%	1%	4%	12
2–3 Jun	YouGov	The Times	GB	1,703	46%	30%	6%	4%	9%	2%	1%	2%	16
28 May – 3 Jun	Ipsos	Evening Standard	GB	1,002	44%	35%	6%	5%	7%	0%	1%	0% UKIP on 0% Other on 0%	9
1–2 Jun	Survation	N/A	UK	1,533	41%	33%	9%	4%	6%	—	1%	5%	8
31 May	Redfield & Wilton	N/A	GB	2,000	45%	34%	8%	4%	5%	3%	0%	2%	11
28–30 May	Savanta ComRes	N/A	UK	2,180	42%	32%	9%	4%	5%	2%	1%	4%	10
27–28 May	Opinium	The Observer	GB	2,004	42%	36%	6%	5%	5%	1%	1%	3% UKIP on 1% Other on 2%	6
27–28 May	YouGov	The Times	GB	1,705	43%	29%	8%	5%	8%	3%	1%	2%	14
27–28 May	Survation	Daily Mail	UK	1,010	43%	33%	10%	5%	5%	—	0%	5%	10
27–28 May	Number Cruncher Politics	N/A	UK	1,001	44%	32%	7%	5%	8%	2%	1%	1%	12
25–26 May	Survation	N/A	UK	1,041	44%	33%	8%	4%	6%	—	0%	4%	11
24 May	Redfield & Wilton	N/A	GB	2,000	43%	33%	10%	4%	5%	3%	1%	2%	10
21–23 May	Savanta ComRes	N/A	UK	2,215	43%	34%	9%	4%	4%	2%	1%	5%	9
19–20 May	YouGov	The Times	GB	1,699	46%	28%	8%	5%	8%	2%	1%	1%	18
17 May	Redfield & Wilton	N/A	GB	2,000	42%	33%	10%	4%	6%	2%	1%	2%	9
14–16 May	Savanta ComRes	N/A	UK	2,131	43%	32%	8%	4%	5%	2%	1%	5%	11
13–15 May	FindOutNow (MRP)	The Sunday Telegraph	GB	14,715	43%	30%	11%	5%	9%	2%	1%	—	13
13–14 May	Opinium	The Observer	GB	2,004	44%	31%	8%	5%	7%	0%	1%	5% UKIP on 2% Other on 3%	13
13 May	Airdrie and Shotts by-election (SNP hold)												
11–12 May	YouGov	The Times	GB	1,647	45%	30%	7%	5%	8%	2%	1%	2%	15
10 May	Redfield & Wilton	N/A	GB	2,000	45%	34%	8%	4%	5%	2%	0%	2%	11
7–9 May	Savanta ComRes	N/A	UK	2,152	42%	34%	8%	5%	4%	2%	1%	5%	8
6 May	Local elections in England and Wales; Scottish Parliament election and Senedd election; Hartlepool by-election (Con gain from Lab)												
4–5 May	YouGov	The Times	GB	1,683	43%	33%	7%	5%	6%	3%	1%	2%	10
4–5 May	Panelbase	N/A	GB	1,003	45%	36%	6%	4%	5%	—	1%	3%	9
3 May	Redfield & Wilton	N/A	GB	2,000	40%	38%	7%	4%	5%	3%	1%	1%	2
30 Apr – 2 May	Savanta ComRes	N/A	UK	2,242	40%	36%	8%	4%	4%	2%	1%	4%	4
29–30 Apr	Focaldata	The Sunday Times	GB	1,555	40%	39%	6%	4%	4%	3%	1%	2%	1
28–30 Apr	Opinium	The Observer	GB	2,001	42%	37%	7%	5%	4%	0%	1%	4% UKIP on 2% Other on 2%	5
28–29 Apr	Number Cruncher Politics	N/A	UK	1,001	43%	34%	5%	5%	7%	2%	1%	2%	9
27–29 Apr	Survation	Daily Mail	UK	1,077	39%	38%	9%	4%	6%	—	0%	5%	1
27–28 Apr	YouGov	The Times	GB	1,803	44%	33%	7%	4%	7%	3%	1%	1%	11
26 Apr	Redfield & Wilton	N/A	GB	2,000	44%	34%	8%	5%	4%	3%	1%	1%	10
22–26 Apr	Kantar Public	N/A	GB	1,115	41%	33%	10%	5%	7%	3%	0%	1%	8
22–26 Apr	BMG	The Independent	GB	1,500	39%	35%	9%	4%	6%	3%	1%	2%	4
23–25 Apr	Savanta ComRes	N/A	UK	2,144	42%	35%	8%	5%	3%	2%	1%	4%	7
21–23 Apr	Opinium	The Observer	GB	2,000	44%	33%	7%	6%	5%	0%	1%	5% UKIP on 2% Other on 3%	11
21–22 Apr	YouGov	The Times	GB	1,730	44%	34%	5%	5%	7%	2%	1%	2%	10
16–22 Apr	Ipsos	Evening Standard	GB	1,090	40%	37%	8%	6%	5%	2%	1%	2% UKIP on 1% Other on 1%	3
19 Apr	Redfield & Wilton	N/A	GB	2,000	44%	34%	10%	4%	4%	3%	1%	2%	10
15–19 Apr	Survation	N/A	UK	1,008	40%	34%	9%	4%	7%	—	1%	6%	6
16–18 Apr	Savanta ComRes	N/A	UK	2,094	43%	34%	7%	5%	4%	1%	1%	5%	9
13–14 Apr	YouGov	The Times	GB	1,689	43%	29%	8%	5%	8%	3%	1%	2%	14
12 Apr	Redfield & Wilton	N/A	GB	2,000	43%	36%	7%	4%	5%	3%	1%	2%	7
9–11 Apr	Savanta ComRes	N/A	UK	2,174	42%	35%	7%	5%	4%	2%	1%	4%	7
8–10 Apr	Survation	N/A	UK	1,009	43%	35%	8%	3%	4%	—	1%	5%	8
8–10 Apr	Deltapoll	The Mail on Sunday	GB	1,608	45%	36%	6%	2%	4%	4%	0%	3% UKIP on 2% Other on 1%	9
8–9 Apr	Opinium	The Observer	GB	2,006	45%	36%	6%	6%	4%	0%	1%	3% UKIP on 1% Other on 2%	9
7–8 Apr	YouGov	The Times	GB	1,708	41%	34%	6%	5%	6%	3%	1%	3%	7
5 Apr	Redfield & Wilton	N/A	GB	2,000	44%	34%	9%	4%	5%	2%	0%	2%	10
2–4 Apr	Savanta ComRes	N/A	UK	2,065	42%	35%	8%	4%	3%	2%	1%	4%	7
31 Mar – 1 Apr	YouGov	The Times	GB	1,736	42%	34%	7%	5%	6%	3%	1%	2%	8
29 Mar	Redfield & Wilton	N/A	GB	2,000	44%	36%	7%	4%	4%	2%	1%	2%	8
25–29 Mar	Kantar Public	N/A	GB	1,102	42%	34%	9%	7%	4%	2%	1%	2% UKIP on 1% Other on 1%	8
25–27 Mar	Deltapoll	The Mail on Sunday	GB	1,610	44%	36%	6%	2%	4%	3%	0%	5% UKIP on 4% Other on 1%	8
25–26 Mar	YouGov	The Times	GB	1,742	42%	32%	8%	5%	7%	3%	1%	2%	10
25–26 Mar	Opinium	The Observer	GB	2,002	41%	37%	6%	6%	5%	1%	1%	4% UKIP on 2% Other on 2%	4
22 Mar	Redfield & Wilton	N/A	GB	2,000	42%	36%	9%	4%	6%	2%	1%	1%	6
19–21 Mar	Savanta ComRes	N/A	UK	2,098	42%	38%	6%	4%	3%	2%	1%	4%	4
18–19 Mar	YouGov	The Times	GB	1,692	43%	34%	5%	5%	7%	3%	1%	2%	9
16–19 Mar	BMG	The Independent	GB	1,498	39%	37%	9%	4%	6%	3%	1%	1%	2
12–16 Mar	Number Cruncher Politics	N/A	UK	1,001	42%	37%	7%	5%	5%	2%	1%	2%	5
15 Mar	Redfield & Wilton	N/A	GB	2,000	43%	36%	7%	4%	5%	3%	0%	1%	7
12–14 Mar	Savanta ComRes	N/A	UK	2,092	39%	37%	8%	4%	4%	3%	1%	4%	2
11–12 Mar	Opinium	The Observer	GB	2,001	43%	37%	6%	5%	4%	0%	1%	3% UKIP on 1% Other on 2%	6
5–12 Mar	Ipsos	Evening Standard	GB	1,009	45%	38%	6%	5%	5%	0%	0%	1%	7
9–10 Mar	YouGov	The Times	GB	1,680	42%	33%	7%	4%	6%	3%	1%	2%	9
9–10 Mar	Survation	Sunday Mirror	UK	1,037	43%	33%	9%	5%	5%	1%	1%	4%	10
8 Mar	Redfield & Wilton	N/A	GB	2,000	45%	36%	7%	4%	4%	3%	0%	1%	9
5–7 Mar	Savanta ComRes	N/A	UK	2,129	42%	36%	8%	4%	4%	3%	1%	4%	6
6 Mar	Richard Tice becomes leader of Reform UK												
3–4 Mar	YouGov	The Times	GB	1,715	45%	32%	6%	5%	7%	3%	1%	1%	13
1 Mar	Redfield & Wilton	N/A	GB	1,500	44%	38%	7%	4%	3%	2%	0%	1%	6
26–28 Feb	Savanta ComRes	N/A	UK	2,182	43%	36%	7%	4%	3%	3%	1%	3%	7
25–26 Feb	YouGov	The Times	GB	1,637	41%	36%	5%	5%	7%	3%	1%	1%	5
24–26 Feb	Deltapoll	The Mail on Sunday	GB	1,527	42%	38%	6%	2%	4%	3%	0%	4% UKIP on 3% Other on 1%	4
24–26 Feb	Opinium	The Observer	GB	2,003	43%	36%	7%	6%	4%	0%	1%	3% UKIP on 1% Other on 2%	7
23–25 Feb	Survation	N/A	UK	1,002	42%	34%	7%	5%	6%	—	1%	5%	8
22 Feb	Redfield & Wilton	N/A	GB	2,000	43%	37%	7%	4%	5%	3%	0%	1%	6
18–22 Feb	Kantar Public	N/A	GB	1,114	40%	33%	11%	4%	6%	3%	1%	3% UKIP on 2% Other on 1%	7
19–21 Feb	Savanta ComRes	N/A	UK	2,189	40%	38%	7%	4%	3%	3%	1%	5%	2
17–18 Feb	YouGov	The Times	GB	1,663	40%	37%	7%	5%	6%	3%	1%	1%	3
15 Feb	Redfield & Wilton	N/A	GB	2,000	41%	39%	8%	5%	5%	2%	0%	1%	2
12–14 Feb	Savanta ComRes	N/A	UK	2,170	42%	37%	7%	4%	3%	2%	1%	4%	5
11–12 Feb	Opinium	The Observer	UK	2,006	42%	37%	6%	5%	5%	0%	1%	4% UKIP on 1% Other on 3%	5
9–10 Feb	YouGov	The Times	GB	1,660	41%	36%	6%	5%	7%	3%	1%	3%	5
8 Feb	Redfield & Wilton	N/A	GB	2,000	43%	38%	7%	5%	4%	2%	0%	1%	5
5–7 Feb	Savanta ComRes	N/A	UK	2,119	41%	37%	8%	4%	4%	2%	1%	4%	4
5–6 Feb	Survation	N/A	UK	1,003	39%	33%	9%	5%	7%	—	1%	5%	6
29 Jan – 4 Feb	Ipsos	Evening Standard	GB	1,056	42%	38%	7%	5%	8%	0%	0%	0%	4
2–3 Feb	YouGov	The Times	GB	1,684	41%	37%	6%	5%	6%	3%	1%	2%	4
2 Feb	FindOutNow	N/A	GB	5,002	39%	38%	7%	6%	6%	3%	—	1%	1
1 Feb	Redfield & Wilton	N/A	GB	2,000	40%	38%	8%	5%	4%	3%	0%	1%	2
25 Jan – 1 Feb	Number Cruncher Politics	ITV	UK	2,001	43%	37%	5%	5%	5%	3%	1%	1%	6
29–31 Jan	Savanta ComRes	N/A	UK	2,288	41%	38%	6%	5%	3%	2%	1%	4%	3
28–29 Jan	Opinium	The Observer	UK	2,002	41%	38%	7%	5%	4%	1%	1%	3% UKIP on 2% Other on 1%	3
26–27 Jan	YouGov	The Times	GB	1,721	37%	41%	6%	5%	4%	3%	1%	3%	4
25 Jan	Redfield & Wilton	N/A	GB	2,000	42%	37%	8%	5%	4%	3%	0%	2%	5
21–25 Jan	Kantar Public	N/A	GB	1,100	40%	37%	10%	4%	5%	2%	—	2% UKIP on 1% Other on 1%	3
22–24 Jan	Savanta ComRes	N/A	UK	2,070	40%	37%	8%	5%	3%	2%	0%	4%	3
21–23 Jan	Deltapoll	The Mail on Sunday	GB	1,632	41%	39%	7%	4%	3%	2%	0%	4% UKIP on 3% Other on 1%	2
21–22 Jan	YouGov	The Times	GB	1,703	39%	38%	5%	5%	6%	4%	1%	2%	1
18 Jan	Redfield & Wilton	N/A	GB	2,000	40%	38%	8%	4%	5%	2%	0%	2%	2
15–17 Jan	Savanta ComRes	N/A	UK	1,914	39%	37%	7%	5%	3%	2%	0%	5%	2
14–15 Jan	Opinium	The Observer	UK	2,003	37%	41%	6%	6%	4%	—	1%	4% UKIP on 1% Other on 3%	4
13–14 Jan	YouGov	The Times	GB	1,702	38%	39%	5%	5%	6%	3%	1%	2%	1
12–13 Jan	Survation	N/A	UK	1,033	40%	38%	7%	4%	5%	1%	0%	6%	2
11 Jan	Redfield & Wilton	N/A	GB	2,000	41%	37%	8%	5%	5%	2%	0%	1%	4
8–10 Jan	Savanta ComRes	N/A	UK	1,550	40%	37%	8%	4%	4%	2%	1%	4%	3
6–7 Jan	Opinium	The Observer	UK	2,003	39%	40%	6%	5%	4%	—	1%	3%	1
4–5 Jan	YouGov	The Times	GB	1,704	39%	39%	6%	5%	6%	3%	1%	2%	Tie

=== 2020 ===
Dates conducted	Pollster	Client	Area	Sample size	Con	Lab	LD	SNP	Grn	Brx	PC	Others	Lead
26–30 Dec	Deltapoll	Daily Mirror	GB	1,608	43%	38%	4%	5%	5%	3%	0%	3% UKIP on 2% Other on 1%	5
4–29 Dec	Focaldata (MRP)	N/A	GB	22,186	36%	38%	9%	4%	7%	4%	1%	2%	2
22 Dec	Survation	N/A	UK	1,011	39%	38%	8%	5%	4%	1%	0%	6%	1
21–22 Dec	YouGov	The Times	GB	1,713	37%	41%	5%	5%	5%	4%	1%	1%	4
18–21 Dec	Savanta ComRes	Daily Express	UK	1,433	41%	39%	8%	5%	4%	2%	1%	1%	2
16–17 Dec	Opinium	The Observer	UK	2,001	39%	39%	6%	5%	4%	—	—	6% UKIP on 3% Other on 3%	Tie
15–16 Dec	YouGov	The Times	GB	1,898	39%	37%	6%	5%	6%	4%	1%	2%	2
10–14 Dec	Kantar Public	N/A	GB	1,137	38%	37%	10%	5%	3%	3%	1%	2% UKIP on 1% Other on 1%	1
11–13 Dec	Savanta ComRes	N/A	UK	1,295	38%	37%	8%	5%	5%	4%	0%	3%	1
4–10 Dec	Ipsos	Evening Standard	GB	1,027	41%	41%	6%	5%	5%	0%	1%	1% UKIP on 0% Other on 1%	Tie
4–10 Dec	Survation	N/A	UK	3,452	39%	37%	8%	5%	5%	1%	0%	5%	2
8–9 Dec	YouGov	The Times	GB	1,699	37%	37%	8%	5%	6%	5%	1%	1%	Tie
27 Nov – 8 Dec	Opinium	The Observer	UK	6,949	40%	38%	6%	5%	4%	0%	1%	4% UKIP on 2% Other on 2%	2
3–4 Dec	Opinium	The Observer	UK	2,002	38%	40%	6%	6%	3%	—	1%	7% UKIP on 3% Other on 4%	2
2–3 Dec	YouGov	The Times	GB	1,706	38%	38%	6%	5%	5%	3%	1%	3%	Tie
2 Dec	Redfield & Wilton	N/A	GB	2,000	40%	37%	9%	5%	6%	—	1%	3%	3
27–29 Nov	Savanta ComRes	N/A	UK	1,428	39%	38%	8%	5%	3%	3%	1%	4%	1
26–28 Nov	Deltapoll	Daily Mail	GB	1,525	37%	38%	9%	4%	4%	3%	1%	4% UKIP on 4% Other on 0%	1
20–28 Nov	Number Cruncher Politics	N/A	GB	1,001	39%	37%	7%	5%	5%	4%	1%	1%	2
26–27 Nov	YouGov	The Times	GB	1,696	37%	40%	5%	6%	5%	5%	1%	2%	3
20–22 Nov	Savanta ComRes	N/A	UK	1,272	39%	37%	7%	5%	4%	3%	1%	4%	2
19–20 Nov	Opinium	The Observer	UK	2,001	41%	38%	6%	6%	4%	—	1%	4% UKIP on 2% Other on 2%	3
19 Nov	Redfield & Wilton	N/A	GB	2,500	40%	39%	8%	5%	4%	—	0%	4%	1
17–18 Nov	YouGov	The Times	GB	1,700	38%	37%	7%	6%	6%	4%	1%	2%	1
13–15 Nov	Savanta ComRes	N/A	UK	2,075	41%	38%	5%	5%	4%	2%	0%	4%	3
11–12 Nov	YouGov	The Times	GB	1,632	38%	40%	5%	5%	5%	4%	1%	1%	2
11 Nov	Redfield & Wilton	N/A	GB	2,500	40%	40%	7%	5%	5%	—	0%	3%	Tie
6–9 Nov	Savanta ComRes	N/A	UK	2,130	40%	36%	8%	5%	5%	2%	0%	3%	4
5–9 Nov	Kantar Public	N/A	GB	1,141	40%	36%	8%	5%	5%	2%	0%	2% UKIP on 1% Other on 1%	4
5–6 Nov	Opinium	The Observer	UK	2,003	38%	42%	7%	5%	3%	—	1%	5% UKIP on 2% Other on 3%	4
5–6 Nov	Survation	N/A	UK	1,034	39%	37%	9%	5%	4%	2%	0%	4%	2
4–5 Nov	YouGov	The Times	GB	1,665	35%	40%	7%	5%	4%	6%	1%	2%	5
30 Oct – 2 Nov	Savanta ComRes	N/A	UK	2,126	40%	40%	7%	5%	3%	2%	0%	2%	Tie
28–29 Oct	YouGov	The Times	GB	1,658	38%	38%	6%	5%	5%	4%	1%	2%	Tie
28 Oct	Redfield & Wilton	N/A	GB	3,000	39%	41%	7%	4%	4%	—	0%	4%	2
22–28 Oct	Ipsos	Evening Standard	GB	1,007	37%	42%	8%	6%	5%	1%	1%	1%	5
23–26 Oct	Savanta ComRes	N/A	UK	2,111	42%	39%	7%	4%	3%	2%	0%	2%	3
22–24 Oct	Deltapoll	The Mail on Sunday	GB	1,589	42%	39%	7%	3%	3%	3%	0%	4% UKIP on 2% Other on 2%	3
22–23 Oct	Opinium	The Observer	UK	2,002	38%	40%	6%	5%	5%	—	1%	5% UKIP on 2% Other on 3%	2
21–22 Oct	YouGov	The Times	GB	1,665	40%	39%	7%	5%	5%	3%	1%	2%	1
21 Oct	Redfield & Wilton	N/A	GB	3,000	40%	40%	7%	5%	4%	—	0%	3%	Tie
16–18 Oct	Savanta ComRes	N/A	UK	2,274	42%	36%	8%	4%	3%	2%	1%	4%	6
9–17 Oct	Number Cruncher Politics	Peston	GB	2,088	41%	38%	5%	5%	6%	4%	0%	1%	3
14–15 Oct	YouGov	The Times	GB	1,675	39%	38%	6%	5%	6%	5%	1%	1%	1
9–11 Oct	Savanta ComRes	N/A	UK	2,123	39%	39%	7%	5%	4%	3%	1%	3%	Tie
8–9 Oct	Opinium	The Observer	UK	2,001	40%	40%	6%	6%	3%	—	1%	5% UKIP on 3% Other on 2%	Tie
6–7 Oct	Redfield & Wilton	N/A	GB	3,000	41%	39%	8%	4%	4%	—	0%	3%	2
6–7 Oct	YouGov	The Times	GB	1,673	41%	38%	5%	5%	6%	3%	1%	1%	3
5–6 Oct	Survation	N/A	UK	1,022	41%	37%	7%	4%	4%	1%	1%	5%	4
2–4 Oct	Savanta ComRes	N/A	UK	2,081	42%	39%	7%	4%	3%	2%	1%	2%	3
30 Sep – 1 Oct	Redfield & Wilton	N/A	GB	4,000	39%	39%	8%	5%	5%	—	0%	3%	Tie
29–30 Sep	YouGov	The Times	GB	1,700	39%	39%	6%	5%	5%	4%	1%	1%	Tie
25–28 Sep	Savanta ComRes	N/A	UK	2,112	41%	38%	8%	5%	3%	2%	0%	2%	3
24–25 Sep	Deltapoll	The Mail on Sunday	GB	1,583	42%	38%	6%	5%	4%	3%	0%	2% UKIP on 2% Other on 0%	4
23–25 Sep	Opinium	The Observer	UK	2,002	39%	42%	5%	6%	4%	—	1%	3% UKIP on 1% Other on 2%	3
23–24 Sep	YouGov	The Times	GB	1,623	41%	38%	6%	4%	5%	3%	1%	2%	3
22–23 Sep	Redfield & Wilton	N/A	GB	2,500	40%	40%	7%	4%	5%	—	0%	3%	Tie
17–21 Sep	Kantar Public	N/A	GB	1,125	40%	38%	9%	4%	4%	3%	1%	6% UKIP on 2% Other on 1%	2
18–20 Sep	Savanta ComRes	N/A	UK	2,109	40%	37%	8%	5%	3%	3%	0%	4%	3
11–18 Sep	Ipsos	Evening Standard	GB	1,013	40%	37%	8%	7%	5%	0%	0%	2% UKIP on 1% Other on 1%	3
16–17 Sep	YouGov	The Times	GB	1,618	40%	40%	6%	4%	5%	3%	1%	1%	Tie
15–16 Sep	Survation	N/A	UK	1,003	40%	38%	7%	5%	4%	1%	1%	4%	2
15–16 Sep	Redfield & Wilton	N/A	GB	2,500	41%	39%	8%	5%	5%	—	0%	3%	2
9–11 Sep	Opinium	The Observer	GB	2,001	42%	39%	6%	5%	4%	—	1%	2% UKIP on 1% Other on 1%	3
8–9 Sep	YouGov	The Times	GB	1,615	42%	37%	6%	5%	4%	3%	1%	1%	5
4–8 Sep	Number Cruncher Politics	Bloomberg	GB	1,001	42%	38%	6%	5%	5%	2%	0%	2%	4
3–4 Sep	YouGov	The Times	GB	1,633	43%	37%	6%	6%	4%	3%	1%	1%	6
2–4 Sep	Survation	N/A	UK	1,047	40%	38%	8%	5%	4%	1%	1%	3%	2
1–2 Sep	Redfield & Wilton	N/A	GB	2,500	43%	37%	8%	4%	4%	—	0%	3%	6
26–28 Aug	Opinium	The Observer	GB	2,002	40%	40%	6%	5%	3%	—	0%	2% UKIP on 2%	Tie
27 Aug	Ed Davey is elected leader of the Liberal Democrats												
24–25 Aug	YouGov	The Times	GB	1,669	43%	36%	6%	5%	4%	3%	1%	1%	7
24 Aug	Redfield & Wilton	N/A	GB	2,000	42%	37%	9%	4%	5%	—	0%	3%	5
21 Aug	Survation	N/A	UK	1,005	41%	37%	9%	5%	4%	1%	0%	3%	4
19 Aug	Redfield & Wilton	N/A	GB	2,000	44%	37%	7%	4%	4%	—	0%	3%	7
18–19 Aug	YouGov	The Times	GB	1,652	40%	38%	6%	5%	6%	4%	1%	1%	2
14–16 Aug	Savanta ComRes	N/A	UK	2,083	42%	37%	7%	4%	3%	2%	1%	4%	5
13–14 Aug	Opinium	The Observer	GB	2,005	42%	39%	5%	5%	3%	—	1%	5% UKIP on 3% Other on 2%	3
12 Aug	Redfield & Wilton	N/A	GB	2,000	43%	36%	9%	4%	4%	—	0%	3%	7
11–12 Aug	YouGov	The Times	GB	1,634	44%	35%	5%	6%	5%	3%	1%	1%	9
6–10 Aug	Kantar Public	N/A	GB	1,161	42%	35%	8%	6%	3%	3%	1%	2% UKIP on 1% Other on 1%	7
4–5 Aug	YouGov	The Times	GB	1,606	42%	36%	8%	5%	5%	2%	1%	1% UKIP on 0% Other on 1%	6
30 Jul – 4 Aug	Ipsos	Evening Standard	GB	1,019	45%	37%	6%	5%	5%	1%	0%	1%	8
31 Jul – 3 Aug	Survation	N/A	UK	1,019	44%	35%	8%	4%	5%	0%	0%	3%	9
30–31 Jul	YouGov	The Times	GB	1,623	43%	35%	6%	5%	5%	3%	1%	1% UKIP on 0% Other on 1%	8
30–31 Jul	Opinium	The Observer	GB	2,002	41%	38%	6%	6%	4%	—	1%	5% UKIP on 2% Other on 3%	3
29 Jul	Redfield & Wilton	N/A	GB	2,000	43%	38%	7%	4%	4%	—	0%	3%	5
23–24 Jul	Opinium	The Observer	GB	2,002	42%	38%	6%	5%	4%	—	1%	2%	4
22–23 Jul	YouGov	The Times	GB	1,648	44%	35%	7%	5%	4%	3%	1%	1% UKIP on 0% Other on 1%	9
22 Jul	Redfield & Wilton	N/A	GB	2,000	44%	36%	8%	4%	5%	—	1%	3%	8
17–19 Jul	Savanta ComRes	N/A	UK	2,085	43%	37%	6%	5%	2%	2%	1%	4%	6
15–17 Jul	Opinium	The Observer	GB	2,003	44%	36%	6%	6%	4%	—	1%	3% UKIP on 1% Other on 2%	8
15 Jul	Redfield & Wilton	N/A	GB	2,000	44%	37%	8%	4%	4%	—	0%	2%	7
9–13 Jul	Kantar Public	N/A	GB	1,131	45%	35%	9%	5%	2%	2%	1%	2% UKIP on 2%	10
10–12 Jul	Survation	N/A	UK	2,022	42%	36%	8%	4%	5%	1%	1%	3%	6
9–10 Jul	Opinium	The Observer	GB	2,002	42%	38%	6%	6%	4%	—	1%	3% UKIP on 2% Other on 1%	4
9–10 Jul	Deltapoll	The Mail on Sunday	GB	1,541	44%	38%	7%	3%	3%	3%	0%	2% UKIP on 1% Other on 1%	6
8–9 Jul	YouGov	The Times	GB	1,614	46%	36%	6%	5%	3%	2%	1%	1% UKIP on 0% Other on 1%	10
8 Jul	Redfield & Wilton	N/A	GB	2,000	44%	39%	7%	4%	4%	—	0%	2%	5
3–6 Jul	Survation	N/A	UK	1,012	44%	37%	7%	4%	4%	0%	0%	3%	7
2–3 Jul	Deltapoll	The Mail on Sunday	GB	1,549	41%	36%	7%	3%	5%	4%	0%	4% UKIP on 3% Other on 1%	5
1–3 Jul	Opinium	The Observer	GB	2,002	41%	37%	8%	5%	4%	—	1%	4% UKIP on 2% Other on 2%	4
1 Jul	Redfield & Wilton	Election Maps UK	GB	2,000	42%	38%	8%	4%	5%	—	0%	2%	4
26–28 Jun	YouGov	The Times	GB	1,626	45%	37%	5%	5%	4%	2%	1%	0% UKIP on 0%	8
25–26 Jun	Opinium	The Observer	GB	2,001	43%	39%	6%	5%	4%	—	1%	3% UKIP on 2% Other on 1%	4
25 Jun	Redfield & Wilton	Election Maps UK	GB	2,000	44%	38%	7%	4%	4%	—	0%	2%	6
24–25 Jun	Survation	N/A	UK	2,003	43%	36%	8%	5%	4%	0%	0%	4%	7
18–19 Jun	Opinium	The Observer	GB	2,001	44%	40%	5%	5%	3%	—	1%	2% UKIP on 1% Other on 1%	4
18 Jun	Redfield & Wilton	N/A	GB	2,000	43%	38%	8%	4%	4%	—	1%	3%	5
11–15 Jun	Kantar Public	N/A	GB	1,124	43%	35%	8%	5%	4%	2%	0%	1% UKIP on 1%	8
12–14 Jun	Savanta ComRes	The Daily Telegraph	UK	2,106	40%	36%	9%	5%	3%	3%	1%	4%	4
11–12 Jun	Opinium	The Observer	GB	2,001	44%	39%	6%	5%	2%	—	0%	2% UKIP on 1% Other on 1%	5
11–12 Jun	YouGov	The Times	GB	1,693	45%	37%	6%	5%	4%	2%	1%	0% UKIP on 0%	8
11 Jun	Redfield & Wilton	N/A	GB	1,500	41%	39%	9%	5%	4%	—	0%	2%	2
9–10 Jun	Survation	N/A	UK	1,062	42%	36%	8%	5%	4%	1%	1%	3%	6
5–10 Jun	Ipsos	Evening Standard	GB	1,059	43%	38%	10%	4%	1%	3%	0%	1%	5
4–5 Jun	Opinium	The Observer		2,002	43%	40%	6%	5%	3%	—	1%	2% UKIP on 2%	3
4–5 Jun	Deltapoll	The Mail on Sunday		1,547	41%	38%	8%	2%	4%	3%	0%	3% UKIP on 2% Other on 1%	3
3 Jun	Survation	N/A	UK	1,018	41%	39%	7%	4%	4%	1%	1%	3%	2
3 Jun	Redfield & Wilton	N/A	GB	1,500	43%	36%	9%	4%	5%	—	1%	3%	7
29–30 May	YouGov	The Times	GB	1,650	45%	35%	6%	5%	5%	2%	0%	1% UKIP on 0% Other on 1%	10
28–29 May	Opinium	The Observer	GB	2,012	43%	39%	6%	5%	3%	—	1%	4% UKIP on 1% Other on 2%	4
27–28 May	Deltapoll	The Mail on Sunday	GB	1,557	43%	38%	8%	3%	4%	2%	0%	2% UKIP on 2%	5
27 May	Redfield & Wilton	N/A	GB	1,500	43%	37%	9%	5%	3%	—	0%	3%	6
26–27 May	YouGov	DatapraxisEU	GB	2,029	43%	38%	6%	5%	4%	3%	1%	1% UKIP on 0% Other on 1%	5
25–26 May	YouGov	The Times	GB	1,629	44%	38%	6%	5%	4%	2%	1%	1% UKIP on 0% Other on 1%	6
22–26 May	Survation	N/A	UK	1,040	46%	33%	8%	5%	4%	0%	0%	4%	13
21–22 May	Opinium	The Observer	GB	2,008	47%	35%	6%	5%	3%	—	0%	3% UKIP on 2% Other on 1%	12
18–19 May	YouGov	The Times	GB	1,718	48%	33%	6%	5%	5%	2%	1%	1% UKIP on 0% Other on 1%	15
15–17 May	Savanta ComRes	N/A	GB	2,079	46%	33%	7%	4%	4%	2%	1%	1%	13
15 May	Redfield & Wilton	N/A	GB	1,500	47%	35%	9%	4%	3%	—	0%	2%	12
13–14 May	Opinium	The Observer	GB	1,062	49%	34%	6%	5%	3%	—	1%	2% UKIP on 1% Other on 1%	15
5–11 May	Kantar Public	N/A	GB	1,130	51%	32%	7%	5%	2%	2%	1%	1% UKIP on 0% Other on 1%	19
5–7 May	Opinium	The Observer	GB	1,053	49%	33%	6%	5%	5%	0%	1%	2% UKIP on 1% Other on 1%	16
6 May	Redfield & Wilton	N/A	GB	1,500	50%	31%	7%	4%	5%	—	0%	3%	19
5–6 May	YouGov	The Times	GB	1,667	50%	30%	7%	4%	5%	3%	1%	1% UKIP on 0% Other on 1%	20
27 Apr – 1 May	Opinium	The Observer	GB	1,072	51%	33%	6%	5%	3%	0%	1%	2% UKIP on 1% Other on 1%	18
27–28 Apr	Survation	N/A	UK	1,023	48%	31%	8%	4%	5%	1%	1%	3%	17
26 Apr	Redfield & Wilton	N/A	GB	1,500	50%	33%	7%	5%	4%	—	0%	1%	17
21–23 Apr	Opinium	The Observer	GB	2,000	50%	33%	7%	5%	3%	0%	0%	2% UKIP on 1% Other on 1%	17
16–20 Apr	Kantar Public	N/A	GB	1,118	54%	28%	9%	4%	4%	1%	1%	0% UKIP on 0%	26
17 Apr	Redfield & Wilton	N/A	GB	1,500	52%	31%	8%	4%	3%	—	1%	2%	21
16–17 Apr	YouGov	The Times	GB	2,015	53%	32%	5%	4%	3%	1%	1%	2% UKIP on 0% Other on 1%	21
15–17 Apr	Opinium	The Observer	GB	2,000	51%	32%	6%	5%	3%	0%	0%	2% UKIP on 1% Other on 1%	19
7–9 Apr	Opinium	The Observer	GB	2,005	55%	29%	5%	5%	4%	0%	0%	2% UKIP on 1% Other on 1%	26
7–9 Apr	BMG	The Independent	GB	1,541	46%	29%	10%	3%	6%	2%	1%	2% UKIP on 1% Other on 1%	17
4 Apr	Keir Starmer is elected leader of the Labour Party												
1–3 Apr	Opinium	The Observer	GB	2,000	53%	30%	7%	5%	3%	0%	1%	2% UKIP on 1% Other on 1%	23
1–2 Apr	Redfield & Wilton	N/A	UK	2,000	49%	29%	8%	4%	4%	—	1%	5%	20
1–2 Apr	YouGov	The Times	GB	1,631	52%	28%	8%	5%	5%	1%	1%	1% UKIP on 0% Other on 1%	24
26–27 Mar	Opinium	The Observer	GB	2,006	54%	28%	6%	5%	3%	0%	1%	2% UKIP on 1% Other on 1%	26
24–26 Mar	Number Cruncher Politics	Bloomberg	GB	1,010	54%	28%	7%	4%	4%	2%	0%	—	26
23 Mar	Redfield & Wilton	N/A	GB	1,500	47%	29%	8%	5%	5%	—	1%	5%	18
19–20 Mar	Opinium	The Observer	GB	2,005	51%	31%	7%	5%	3%	0%	1%	2% UKIP on 1% Other on 1%	20
13–16 Mar	Ipsos	Evening Standard	GB	1,003	52%	30%	9%	4%	4%	0%	1%	—	22
12–13 Mar	Opinium	The Observer	GB	2,005	49%	32%	6%	5%	5%	0%	1%	3% UKIP on 2% Other on 1%	17
5–9 Mar	Kantar Public	N/A	GB	1,171	50%	29%	11%	4%	1%	2%	1%	2% UKIP on 1% Other on 1%	21
3–6 Mar	BMG	The Independent	GB	1,498	45%	28%	11%	3%	6%	3%	1%	2% UKIP on 1% Other on 1%	17
19–20 Feb	Savanta ComRes	Sunday Express	GB	2,005	47%	31%	9%	4%	4%	3%	1%	—	16
12–14 Feb	Opinium	The Observer	GB	2,007	47%	32%	7%	6%	4%	2%	1%	1% UKIP on 0% Other on 1%	15
12 Feb	Redfield & Wilton	N/A	GB	1,216	49%	31%	9%	4%	4%	—	1%	2%	18
9–10 Feb	YouGov	The Times	GB	1,694	48%	28%	10%	4%	6%	2%	1%	1% UKIP on 0% Other on 1%	20
4–7 Feb	BMG	The Independent	GB	1,503	41%	29%	11%	5%	8%	3%	1%	3% UKIP on 2% Other on 1%	12
31 Jan – 3 Feb	Ipsos	Evening Standard	GB	1,001	47%	30%	11%	4%	5%	1%	1%	1%	17
31 Jan – 2 Feb	YouGov	The Times	GB	1,575	49%	30%	8%	4%	5%	2%	1%	1% UKIP on 0% Other on 1%	19
30–31 Jan	Survation	N/A	UK	1,015	44%	33%	10%	5%	3%	3%	0%	2%	11
24–26 Jan	YouGov	The Times	GB	1,628	49%	29%	10%	5%	4%	2%	1%	0% UKIP on 0%	20
15–17 Jan	Opinium	The Observer	GB	1,978	47%	30%	9%	5%	4%	3%	1%	2% UKIP on 0% Other on 2%	17
8–10 Jan	BMG	The Independent	GB	1,508	44%	29%	11%	3%	5%	4%	0%	2% UKIP on 2%	15
12 Dec 2019	2019 general election		UK	—	43.6%	32.1%	11.6%	3.9%	2.7%	2.0%	0.5%	3.2%	11.5
12 Dec 2019	2019 general election		GB	—	44.7%	32.9%	11.8%	4.0%	2.8%	2.1%	0.5%	1.7%	11.8

== Non-geographical samples ==
The following polls sampled subsets of voters according to particular characteristics from across the UK or Great Britain.

=== Ethnic minority voters ===
Dates conducted	Pollster	Client	Area	Sample size	Lab	Con	LD	SNP	Grn	Ref	PC	Others	Lead
4 Jul 2024	2024 general election (Ipsos)		GB	N/A	46%	17%	8%	1%	11%	3%	—	13%	29
11–20 Jun 2024	YouGov	Sky News	GB	1,001	53%	14%	6%	0%	14%	7%	0%	5%	39
21–27 Feb 2022	Number Cruncher Politics	ITV	N/A	1,001	59%	21%	8%	2%	2%	2%	0%	2%	38
7–14 Jun 2021	Number Cruncher Politics	ITV	N/A	501	51%	28%	7%	3%	2%	9%	0%	1%	23
25 Jan – 1 Feb 2021	Number Cruncher Politics	ITV	N/A	1,000	58%	22%	6%	2%	3%	8%	0%	1%	36
9–17 Oct 2020	Number Cruncher Politics	ITV	UK	1,000	60%	22%	5%	3%	2%	5%	0%	1%	38
12 Dec 2019	2019 general election (Ipsos MORI)		GB	27,591	64%	20%	12%	2%	1%	-	—	1%	44

=== Muslim voters ===
Dates conducted	Pollster	Client	Area	Sample size	Lab	Con	LD	SNP	Grn	Ref	PC	Others	Lead
20–29 Jun 2024	More in Common	Community Exchange Hub	GB	1,417	57%	7%	6%	1%	10%	6%	0%	12%	47
24 May – 3 Jun 2024	Savanta	Hyphen	UK	2,862	63%	12%	12%	1%	7%	1%	0%	3%	51
16 Feb – 13 Mar 2024	JL Partners	Henry Jackson Society	UK	1,000	61%	12%	9%	1%	9%	—	—	5%	49
18 Jan – 3 Feb 2024	Survation	Labour Muslim Network	UK	683	60%	8%	9%	4%	14%	—	—	5%	46
27 Oct – 3 Nov 2023	Savanta	N/A	UK	1,023	64%	19%	9%	1%	5%	1%	0%	1%	45
12 Dec 2019
12 Dec 2019	2019 election (JL Partners)		UK	1,000	72%	17%	7%	0%	3%	—	—	0%	55
12 Dec 2019	2019 election (Survation)		UK	504	86%	9%	1%	1%	3%	—	—	0%	77
12 Dec 2019	2019 election (Savanta)		UK	1,023	67%	25%	5%	1%	—	—	—	1%	42

=== Jewish voters ===
Dates conducted	Pollster	Client	Area	Sample size	Con	Lab	Ref	LD	Others	Lead
9–14 Jun 2024	Survation	Jewish Chronicle	UK	504	42%	33%	11%	7%	7%	9

=== Private renter voters ===
Dates conducted	Pollster	Client	Area	Sample size	Lab	Con	LD	Grn	Ref	Others	Lead
4 Jul 2024	2024 general election (Ipsos)		GB	N/A	40%	19%	16%	12%	12%	5% SNP/Plaid Cymru on 3% Other on 2%	21
5–10 Apr 2024	Survation	38 Degrees	UK	2,009	49%	23%	9%	8%	10%	1%	26
2019 election (Ipsos)			UK	N/A	46%	31%	11%	–	—	12%	15

=== Young voters ===
Savanta published polls of voters aged between 18 and 25. The 2019 result comes from the British Election Study's estimate of voters aged 18 to 24 and the 2024 result comes from Ipsos' estimate of voters among the same age group.

Dates conducted	Pollster	Client	Area	Sample size	Lab	Con	LD	SNP	Grn	Ref	Others	Lead
4 Jul 2024	2024 general election (Ipsos)		GB	N/A	41%	5%	16%	5%	19%	8%	5%	22
14–18 Jun 2024	Savanta	ITV Peston	UK	1,243	53%	11%	12%	3%	10%	7%	5%	41
9–12 Apr 2024	Savanta	ITV Peston	UK	1,232	61%	14%	10%	2%	7%	3%	4%	47
22–26 Sep 2023	Savanta	ITV Peston	UK	1,023	56%	15%	16%	3%	5%	1%	4%	40
27 Apr – 3 May 2023	Savanta	ITV Peston	UK	1,023	62%	15%	9%	3%	7%	-	6%	47
12 Dec 2019	2019 general election (British Election Study)		GB	N/A	52%	28%	11%	9%				24

=== GB News viewers ===
Dates conducted	Pollster	Client	Area	Sample size	Con	Lab	LD	SNP	Grn	Ref	Others	Lead
17–20 Jun 2024	JL Partners	GB News	GB	520	24%	38%	8%	2%	3%	25%	0%	13
29–31 May 2024	JL Partners	GB News	GB	530	25%	46%	6%	2%	3%	18%	1%	21
15–22 Apr 2024	JL Partners	GB News	GB	518	28%	39%	6%	2%	3%	20%	2%	11

== Seat projections ==
The general election was contested under the first-past the post electoral system in 650 constituencies. 326 seats were needed for a parliamentary majority.

Most polls were reported in terms of the overall popular vote share, and the pollsters did not typically project how these shares would equate to numbers of seats in the House of Commons.

=== Final projections from aggregators ===
Various models existed which continually projected election outcomes for the seats in Britain based on the aggregate of polling data. Final predictions of some notable models are tabulated below.

Final seat predictions by poll aggregators (GB seats only)
Organisation	Con	Lab	SNP	LD	PC	Grn	Ref	Others	Majority
Britain Predicts/New Statesman	114	418	23	63	3	4	6	1	Lab 186
The Economist	110	429	20	50	3	1	3	1	Lab 208
ElectionMapsUK	101	432	19	68	4	4	3	1	Lab 214
Electoral Calculus	78	453	19	67	3	3	7	2	Lab 256

=== National seat projections ===
Multilevel regression with poststratification (MRP) is the most common methodology for projecting seats nationally. It was used by YouGov to predict outcomes for the 2017 and 2019 elections. Multiple polling companies conducted such polling and modelling for the 2024 election, these are tabulated below. Also included is a stacked regression with poststratification (SRP) poll produced by J.L. Partners, the first time such a method has been used for a UK election. All of these polls use sample sizes substantially larger than typical national polls.

These polls were of Britain only, though the reporting of some results include the 18 Northern Irish seats under "Others". Polling companies also differ in their handling of the Speaker's seat, considering it variously as Labour, "Other", or omitting it from the results. Negative values in the rightmost "majority" column below indicate that the party with the most seats would have a plurality of seats, but would not have a majority. The overall vote share values for these polls, where reported, are also included in the tables above.

Dates conducted	Pollster	Client	Sample size	Area	Con	Lab	SNP	LD	PC	Grn	Ref	Others	Majority
4 Jul 2024	2024 general election	–	–	UK	121	412 (Note: Includes Speaker Lindsay Hoyle's Chorley seat which none of the main parties are contesting.)	9	72	4	4	5	23	Lab 174
15 Jun – 3 Jul 2024	Survation (MRP)	N/A	36,177	GB	64	475	13	60	4	3	13	0	Lab 318
28 Jun – 2 Jul 2024	Techne (MRP)	The Independent	5,503	GB	82	461	19	55	0	3	7	23	Lab 272
19 Jun – 2 Jul 2024	YouGov (MRP)	Sky News	47,751	GB	102	431	18	72	3	2	3	0	Lab 212
24 Jun – 1 Jul 2024	More in Common (MRP)	The News Agents	13,556	GB	126	430	16	52	2	1	2	2	Lab 210
15 Jun – 1 Jul 2024	Survation (MRP)	N/A	34,558	GB	64	484	10	61	3	3	7	0	Lab 318
10 Jun – 1 Jul 2024	Focaldata (MRP)	N/A	36,726	GB	108	444	15	57	2	1	2	19 (Note: Polling was of GB adults only, but 18 seats were assigned to Northern Irish parties in the reporting of the outcome.)	Lab 238
15–27 Jun 2024	Survation (MRP)	N/A	23,364	GB	85	470	12	56	3	2	4	0	Lab 290
7–25 Jun 2024	JL Partners (SRP)	The Sunday Times	13,584	GB	105	450	15	55	3	1	2	19	Lab 250
14–24 Jun 2024	Find Out Now/Electoral Calculus (MRP)	Daily Mirror	19,993	GB	60	450	24	71	4	4	18	1 (Note: Jeremy Corbyn, the independent candidate for Islington North)	Lab 250
30 May – 21 Jun 2024	We Think (MRP)	The Economist	18,595	GB	76	465	29	52	3	3	3	19	Lab 280
4–20 Jun 2024	Focaldata (MRP)	N/A	24,536	GB	110	450	16	50	2	1	1	19	Lab 250
11–18 Jun 2024	YouGov (MRP)	Sky News	39,979	GB	108	425	20	67	4	2	5	0	Lab 200
7–18 Jun 2024	Savanta (MRP)	The Telegraph	17,812	GB	53	516	8	50	4	0	0	0	Lab 382
22 May – 17 Jun 2024	More in Common (MRP)	The News Agents	10,850	GB	155	406	18	49	2	1	0	0	Lab 162
7–12 Jun 2024	Ipsos (MRP)	N/A	19,689	GB	115	453	15	38	4	3	3	0	Lab 256
31 May – 13 Jun 2024	Survation (MRP)	Best for Britain	42,269	GB	72	456	37	56	2	1	7	0	Lab 262
22 May – 2 Jun 2024	Survation (MRP)	Best for Britain	30,044	GB	71	487	26	43	2	0	3	0	Lab 324
24 May – 1 Jun 2024	YouGov (MRP)	Sky News	58,875	GB	140	422	17	48	2	2	0	0	Lab 194
9 Apr – 29 May 2024	More in Common (MRP)	N/A	15,000	GB	180	382	35	30	3	1	0	0	Lab 114
20–27 May 2024	Find Out Now/Electoral Calculus (MRP – with tactical voting)	Daily Mail/GB News	10,390	GB	66	476	26	59	3	2	0	0	Lab 302
20–27 May 2024	Find Out Now/Electoral Calculus (MRP – without tactical voting)	Daily Mail/GB News	10,390	GB	72	493	22	39	4	2	0	0	Lab 336
7–27 Mar 2024	YouGov (MRP)	N/A	18,761	GB	155	403	19	49	4	1	0	0	Lab 156
8–22 Mar 2024	Survation (MRP)	Best for Britain	15,029	GB	98	468	41	22	2	0	0	0	Lab 286
24 Jan – 12 Feb 2024	Find Out Now/Electoral Calculus (MRP)	The Mirror	18,151	GB	80	452	40	53	4	2	0	1	Lab 254
12 Dec – 4 Jan 2024	YouGov (MRP)	Conservative Britain Alliance	14,110	GB	169	385	25	48	3	1	0	0	Lab 120
18 Aug – 1 Sep 2023	Survation (MRP)	Greenpeace	20,205	GB	142	426	36	25	2	1	2	3	Lab 202
29–31 Aug 2023	Stonehaven (MRP)	N/A	2,000	GB	196	372	25	36	–	1	0	5	Lab 90
31 Jul – 4 Aug 2023	Find Out Now/Electoral Calculus	Channel 4	11,000	GB	90	461	38	37	4	1	0	1	Lab 272
20 Apr – 9 May 2023	BestForBritain/Focaldata (Note: First MRP to take into account new constituency boundaries)	N/A	10,102	GB	129 (Note: "The baseline MRP by Focaldata predicted Labour winning 469 seats and the Conservatives 128 seats. 'Don't Know' was predicted to win two seats, namely Aberdeenshire North and Moray East; as well as Boston and Skegness. Given in a General Election scenario 'Don't Know' would not be on the ballot paper, we reallocated these seats to the party in second place. This meant that we awarded Aberdeenshire North and Moray East to the Labour Party; and then Boston and Skegness to the Conservatives in all scenarios and analyses that we performed.")	470	26	25					Lab 290
10–17 Feb 2023	Survation (MRP)	38 Degrees	6,434	GB	100	475	45	5	2	2	2	1	Lab 318
27 Jan – 5 Feb 2023	Find Out Now/Electoral Calculus (MRP)	The Daily Telegraph	28,000	GB	45	509	50	23	4	1	0	0	Lab 368
2–5 Dec 2022	Savanta/Electoral Calculus (MRP)	N/A	6,237	GB	69	482	55	21	4	1	0	0	Lab 314
20–30 Oct 2022	Focaldata/Best for Britain (MRP)	N/A	12,010 (Note: 10,010 sample, 20–26 October 2022; 2,000 sample, 28–30 October 2022. "The MRP poll by Focaldata of 10,010 people, on behalf of the internationalist campaign group Best for Britain, was conducted about the time of Truss's resignation and updated with an MRP poll of 2,000 people after Sunak took over.")	GB	64	518 (Note: 517 listed; one seat (Clacton) is reported as "Don't Know", but "in reality the seat would be won by Labour", and is therefore added to Labour's projected total seat count.)	38	12	0	0	0	0	Lab 404
26–30 Sep 2022	Opinium (MRP)	Trades Union Congress	10,495	GB	138	412	37	39	5	1	0	0	Lab 172
23–27 Sep 2022	FindOutNow/Electoral Calculus (MRP)	Channel 4 News	10,435	GB	174	381	51	21	4	1	0	0	Lab 112
15–16 Sep 2022	Savanta ComRes/Electoral Calculus (MRP)	LabourList	6,226	GB	211	353	48	15	3	1	0	0	Lab 56
6–14 Apr 2022	Focaldata (MRP)	Best for Britain	10,010	GB	230	336	53	8	4	1	0	18	Lab 22
14–22 Mar 2022	Survation (MRP)	38 Degrees	8,002	GB	273	293	54	7	3	1	0	1	Hung (Lab –33)
14–18 Feb 2022	Find Out Now/Electoral Calculus (MRP)	N/A	12,700	GB	243	308	59	16	5	1	0	N/A	Hung (Lab –18)
11–23 Jan 2022	JL Partners Polls (MRP)	Sunday Times	4,561	GB	201	352	58	16	4	1	0	N/A	Lab 54
20–22 Dec 2021	Find Out Now/Electoral Calculus (MRP)	The Daily Telegraph	10,994	GB	249	311	59	8	5	1	0	N/A	Hung (Lab –15)
1–21 Dec 2021	Focaldata (MRP)	The Times	24,373	GB	237	338	48	11	1	1	0	N/A	Lab 26
29 Nov – 1 Dec 2021	Find Out Now/Electoral Calculus (MRP)	The Daily Telegraph	10,272	GB	288	271	59	8	5	1	0	N/A	Hung (Con –38)
5–8 Nov 2021	Find Out Now/Electoral Calculus (MRP)	The Daily Telegraph	10,763	GB	301	257	58	10	5	1	0	N/A	Hung (Con –25)
6–8 Sep 2021	Find Out Now/Electoral Calculus (MRP)	The Daily Telegraph	10,673	GB	311	244	59	12	5	1	0	N/A	Hung (Con –15)
13–15 May 2021	Find Out Now/Electoral Calculus (MRP)	The Sunday Telegraph	14,715	GB	386	172	58	9	5	2	0	N/A	Con 122
4–29 Dec 2020	Focaldata (MRP)	Best for Britain	22,186	GB	284	282	57	2	25				Hung (Con –42)
12 Dec 2019	2019 general election		–	UK	365	202	48	11	4	1	0	19	Con 80

== Exit poll ==
An exit poll conducted by Ipsos for the BBC, ITV, and Sky News was published at the end of voting at 22:00, predicting the number of seats for each party.

Parties	Seats	Change
Labour Party (Note: The Speaker is included in the Labour figure.)	410	▲209
Conservative Party	131	▼241
Liberal Democrats	61	▲53
Reform UK	13	▲13
Scottish National Party	10	▼38
Plaid Cymru	4	▲2
Green Party	2	▲1
Others (Note: This includes the 18 seats in Northern Ireland and 1 other in Great Britain.)	19	▲1
Labour majority of 170

The extent of Labour's victory was projected to be slightly less than seen in the last week of opinion polls, though still a substantial landslide. The exit poll ended up being close to the actual results, apart from the Reform figure which was slightly overestimated.

=== BBC updated forecasts ===
Throughout the night and into the early hours of 5 July, BBC News updated their forecast, combining the exit poll with the results coming in.

Parties	First forecast 3:37 am (Note: With 179 / 650 seats declared.)		Second forecast 5:24 am (Note: With 525 / 650 seats declared.)		Third forecast 7:47 am (Note: With 641 / 650 seats declared.)	
Parties	Seats	Change	Seats	Change	Seats	Change
Labour Party (Note: The Speaker is included in the Labour figures.)	405	▲204	408	▲207	413	▲212
Conservative Party	154	▼218	136	▼236	122	▼250
Liberal Democrats	56	▲48	66	▲58	71	▲63
Scottish National Party	6	▼42	8	▼40	10	▼38
Plaid Cymru	4	▲2	4	▲2	4	▲2
Reform UK	4	▲4	4	▲4	4	▲4
Green Party	2	▲1	2	▲1	4	▲3
Others (Note: First forecast: 18 in NI 1 in GB Second forecast: 18 in NI 4 in GB Third forecast: 18 in NI 4 in GB)	19	▲1	22	▲4	22	▲4
Projected result	Labour majority of 160		Labour majority of 166		Labour majority of 176	

== See also ==
- Sub-national opinion polling for the 2024 United Kingdom general election
- Leadership approval opinion polling for the 2024 United Kingdom general election
- Opinion polling for the 2019 United Kingdom general election
- Opinion polling on the United Kingdom's membership of the European Union (2016–2020)
- Opinion polling for the next United Kingdom general election
- Opinion polling for the 2026 Scottish Parliament election
- Opinion polling for the 2026 Senedd election
