= Leadership approval opinion polling for the 2024 United Kingdom general election =

At various dates in the run up to the 2024 general election on 4 July 2024, various organisations have carried out opinion polling to gauge the opinions that voters hold towards political leaders. The polling companies listed are members of the British Polling Council (BPC) and abide by its disclosure rules. The date range for opinion polls is from the 2019 general election, held on 12 December, to the eve of the 2024 election.

== Leadership approval ratings ==
=== Rishi Sunak ===
The following polls asked about voters' opinions on Rishi Sunak, leader of the Conservative Party and Prime Minister of the United Kingdom since October 2022.

==== 2024 ====
Date(s) conducted	Pollster/client	Sample size	Question wording	Approve	Disapprove	Neither	Don't know	Net approval
21 May	Savanta	2,295	Favourable/Unfavourable	29%	51%	17%	3%	–22%
8–14 May	Ipsos	1,008	Satisfied/Dissatisfied	17%	72%	—N/a	11%	–55%
10–12 May	YouGov	2,069	Favourable/Unfavourable	22%	69%	—N/a	9%	–47%
17 Apr	Opinium	1,943	Approve/Disapprove	22%	56%	18%	4%	–34%
3–15 Apr	Ipsos	1,072	Satisfied/Dissatisfied	16%	75%	9%	—N/a	–59%
31 Mar	Redfield & Wilton	2,000	Approve/Disapprove	26%	47%	27%	—N/a	–21%
24 Mar	Redfield & Wilton	2,000	Approve/Disapprove	26%	51%	23%	—N/a	–25%
19–20 Mar	YouGov	2,037	Favourable/Unfavourable	22%	69%	—N/a	9%	–47%
17 Mar	Redfield & Wilton	2,000	Approve/Disapprove	25%	48%	27%	—N/a	–23%
8–11 Mar	Deltapoll	1,502	Well/Badly	31%	65%	4%	—N/a	–34%
10 Mar	Redfield & Wilton	2,000	Approve/Disapprove	25%	44%	31%	—N/a	–19%
4 Mar	Ipsos	1,004	Satisfied/Dissatisfied	19%	73%	8%	—N/a	–54%
3 Mar	Redfield & Wilton	2,000	Approve/Disapprove	26%	48%	26%	—N/a	–22%
25 Feb	Redfield & Wilton	2,000	Approve/Disapprove	26%	52%	22%	—N/a	–26%
18 Feb	Redfield & Wilton	2,000	Approve/Disapprove	26%	51%	23%	—N/a	–25%
11 Feb	Redfield & Wilton	2,000	Approve/Disapprove	25%	50%	25%	—N/a	–25%
4 Feb	Redfield & Wilton	2,000	Approve/Disapprove	29%	47%	24%	—N/a	–18%
28 Jan	Redfield & Wilton	2,000	Approve/Disapprove	30%	48%	22%	—N/a	–18%
19–22 Jan	Deltapoll	2,176	Well/Badly	31%	63%	—N/a	6%	–32%
21 Jan	Redfield & Wilton	2,000	Approve/Disapprove	27%	48%	25%	—N/a	–21%
14 Jan	Redfield & Wilton	2,000	Approve/Disapprove	29%	44%	27%	—N/a	–15%
7 Jan	Redfield & Wilton	2,000	Approve/Disapprove	31%	46%	23%	—N/a	–15%

==== 2023 ====
Date(s) conducted	Pollster/client	Sample size	Question wording	Approve	Disapprove	Neither	Don't know	Net approval
17 Dec	Redfield & Wilton	2,000	Approve/Disapprove	28%	47%	25%	—N/a	–19%
10 Dec	Redfield & Wilton	2,000	Approve/Disapprove	31%	46%	23%	—N/a	–15%
3 Dec	Redfield & Wilton	2,000	Approve/Disapprove	32%	46%	22%	—N/a	–14%
26 Nov	Redfield & Wilton	2,000	Approve/Disapprove	29%	46%	25%	—N/a	–17%
19 Nov	Redfield & Wilton	2,000	Approve/Disapprove	28%	48%	24%	—N/a	–20%
12 Nov	Redfield & Wilton	2,000	Approve/Disapprove	27%	45%	28%	—N/a	–18%
5 Nov	Redfield & Wilton	2,000	Approve/Disapprove	30%	46%	24%	—N/a	–16%
29 Oct	Redfield & Wilton	2,000	Approve/Disapprove	31%	45%	24%	—N/a	–14%
22 Oct	Redfield & Wilton	2,000	Approve/Disapprove	31%	45%	24%	—N/a	–14%
15 Oct	Redfield & Wilton	2,000	Approve/Disapprove	31%	44%	25%	—N/a	–13%
8 Oct	Redfield & Wilton	2,000	Approve/Disapprove	30%	46%	24%	—N/a	–16%
1 Oct	Redfield & Wilton	2,000	Approve/Disapprove	31%	41%	28%	—N/a	–10%
24 Sep	Redfield & Wilton	2,000	Approve/Disapprove	32%	46%	22%	—N/a	–14%
19 Sep	Ipsos	1,004	Satisfied/Dissatisfied	22%	66%	—N/a	—N/a	–44%
17 Sep	Redfield & Wilton	2,000	Approve/Disapprove	25%	46%	29%	—N/a	–21%
10 Sep	Redfield & Wilton	2,000	Approve/Disapprove	25%	46%	29%	—N/a	–21%
3 Sep	Redfield & Wilton	2,000	Approve/Disapprove	31%	43%	26%	—N/a	–12%
27 Aug	Redfield & Wilton	2,000	Approve/Disapprove	30%	45%	25%	—N/a	–15%
20 Aug	Redfield & Wilton	2,000	Approve/Disapprove	29%	47%	24%	—N/a	–18%
13 Aug	Redfield & Wilton	2,000	Approve/Disapprove	32%	41%	27%	—N/a	–9%
6 Aug	Redfield & Wilton	2,000	Approve/Disapprove	28%	44%	28%	—N/a	–16%
30 Jul	Redfield & Wilton	2,000	Approve/Disapprove	30%	44%	26%	—N/a	–14%
23 Jul	Redfield & Wilton	2,000	Approve/Disapprove	31%	41%	28%	—N/a	–10%
16 Jul	Redfield & Wilton	2,000	Approve/Disapprove	31%	45%	24%	—N/a	–14%
13–14 Jul	YouGov	2,151	Favourable/Unfavourable	27%	61%	—N/a	12%	–34%
9 Jul	Redfield & Wilton	2,000	Approve/Disapprove	29%	45%	26%	—N/a	–16%
2 Jul	Redfield & Wilton	2,000	Approve/Disapprove	26%	42%	32%	—N/a	–16%
25 Jun	Redfield & Wilton	2,000	Approve/Disapprove	32%	43%	25%	—N/a	–11%
18 Jun	Redfield & Wilton	2,000	Approve/Disapprove	30%	39%	31%	—N/a	–9%
11 Jun	Redfield & Wilton	2,000	Approve/Disapprove	32%	41%	27%	—N/a	–9%
4 Jun	Redfield & Wilton	2,000	Approve/Disapprove	33%	42%	25%	—N/a	–9%
28 May	Redfield & Wilton	2,000	Approve/Disapprove	30%	44%	26%	—N/a	–14%
21 May	Redfield & Wilton	2,000	Approve/Disapprove	30%	41%	29%	—N/a	–11%
14 May	Redfield & Wilton	2,000	Approve/Disapprove	33%	38%	29%	—N/a	–5%
11–12 May	Omnisis	1,355	Approve/Disapprove	28%	42%	30%	—N/a	–13%
9 May	Deltapoll	1,550	Well/Badly	41%	52%	—N/a	8%	–11%
7 May	Redfield & Wilton	2,000	Approve/Disapprove	33%	40%	27%	—N/a	–7%
30 Apr	Redfield & Wilton	2,000	Approve/Disapprove	35%	40%	25%	—N/a	–5%
23 Apr	Redfield & Wilton	2,000	Approve/Disapprove	33%	39%	28%	—N/a	–6%
16 Apr	Redfield & Wilton	2,000	Approve/Disapprove	31%	38%	31%	—N/a	–7%
9 Apr	Redfield & Wilton	2,000	Approve/Disapprove	32%	40%	28%	—N/a	–8%
2 Apr	Redfield & Wilton	2,000	Approve/Disapprove	31%	42%	27%	—N/a	–11%
26 Mar	Redfield & Wilton	2,000	Approve/Disapprove	32%	40%	28%	—N/a	–8%
19 Mar	Redfield & Wilton	2,000	Approve/Disapprove	30%	41%	29%	—N/a	–11%
12 Mar	Redfield & Wilton	2,000	Approve/Disapprove	30%	41%	29%	—N/a	–11%
5 Mar	Redfield & Wilton	2,000	Approve/Disapprove	30%	39%	31%	—N/a	–9%
26 Feb	Redfield & Wilton	2,000	Approve/Disapprove	25%	42%	33%	—N/a	–17%
18 Feb	Redfield & Wilton	2,000	Approve/Disapprove	24%	46%	30%	—N/a	–22%
12 Feb	Redfield & Wilton	2,000	Approve/Disapprove	28%	44%	28%	—N/a	–16%
5 Feb	Redfield & Wilton	2,000	Approve/Disapprove	24%	44%	32%	—N/a	–20%
3 Feb	Omnisis	1,324	Approve/Disapprove	23%	45%	—N/a	32%	–22%
29 Jan	Redfield & Wilton	2,000	Approve/Disapprove	26%	44%	30%	—N/a	–18%
26 Jan	Omnisis	1,068	Approve/Disapprove	27%	47%	—N/a	26%	–20%
22 Jan	Redfield & Wilton	2,000	Approve/Disapprove	25%	40%	35%	—N/a	–15%
19 Jan	Omnisis	1,268	Approve/Disapprove	26%	41%	33%	—N/a	–15%
17–18 Jan	YouGov	2,024	Favourable/Unfavourable	31%	60%	—	11%	–29%
15 Jan	Redfield & Wilton	2,000	Approve/Disapprove	28%	38%	34%	—N/a	–10%
13 Jan	Omnisis	1,203	Approve/Disapprove	30%	35%	35%	—N/a	–5%
8 Jan	Redfield & Wilton	2,000	Approve/Disapprove	28%	39%	33%	—N/a	–11%
2–3 Jan	Redfield & Wilton	2,000	Approve/Disapprove	27%	31%	42%	—N/a	–4%

==== 2022 ====
Date(s) conducted	Pollster/client	Sample size	Question wording	Approve	Disapprove	Neither	Don't know	Net approval
11 Dec	Redfield & Wilton	2,000	Approve/Disapprove	30%	33%	37%	—N/a	–3%
4 Dec	Redfield & Wilton	2,000	Approve/Disapprove	30%	33%	37%	—N/a	–3%
27 Nov	Redfield & Wilton	2,000	Approve/Disapprove	33%	33%	34%	—N/a	0%
28 Oct	Omnisis	1,383	Approve/Disapprove	34%	22%	45%	—N/a	+12%
26 Oct	PeoplePolling	1,185	Favourable/Unfavourable	30%	40%	9%	21%	–10%
25–26 Oct	Redfield & Wilton	1,500	Approve/Disapprove	27%	25%	35%	13%	+2%
24–26 Oct	BMG Research	1,568	Satisfied/Dissatisfied	26%	21%	37%	—N/a	+5%
24–25 Oct	YouGov	1,659	Favourable/Unfavourable	39%	48%	12%	—N/a	–9%

=== Keir Starmer ===
The following polls asked about voters' opinions on Keir Starmer, leader of the Labour Party and Leader of the Opposition since April 2020.

==== 2024 ====
Date(s) conducted	Pollster/client	Sample size	Question wording	Approve	Disapprove	Neither	Don't know	Net approval
21 May	Savanta	2,295	Favourable/Unfavourable	39%	38%	18%	6%	+1%
8–14 May	Ipsos	1,008	Satisfied/Dissatisfied	32%	50%	—N/a	17%	–18%
10–12 May	YouGov	2,069	Favourable/Unfavourable	33%	53%	—N/a	14%	–20%
17 Apr	Opinium	1,943	Approve/Disapprove	30%	40%	23%	8%	–10%
3–15 Apr	Ipsos	1,072	Satisfied/Dissatisfied	25%	56%	19%	—N/a	–31%
3–5 Apr	Opinium	2,000	Approve/Disapprove	31%	38%	31%	—N/a	–7%
31 Mar	Redfield & Wilton	2,000	Approve/Disapprove	38%	28%	34%	—N/a	+10%
24 Mar	Redfield & Wilton	2,000	Approve/Disapprove	36%	30%	34%	—N/a	+6%
22–25 Mar	Deltapoll	1,589	Well/Badly	44%	44%	12%	—N/a	0%
19–20 Mar	YouGov	2,037	Favourable/Unfavourable	32%	53%	—N/a	14%	–21%
17 Mar	Redfield & Wilton	2,000	Approve/Disapprove	36%	28%	36%	—N/a	+8%
8–11 Mar	Deltapoll	1,502	Well/Badly	40%	49%	11%	—N/a	–8%
10 Mar	Redfield & Wilton	2,000	Approve/Disapprove	34%	26%	40%	—N/a	+8%
4 Mar	Ipsos	1,004	Satisfied/Dissatisfied	29%	55%	16%	—N/a	–26%
3 Mar	Redfield & Wilton	2,000	Approve/Disapprove	36%	34%	30%	—N/a	+2%
25 Feb	Redfield & Wilton	2,000	Approve/Disapprove	35%	33%	32%	—N/a	+2%
22 Feb	Savanta	2,118	Favourable/Unfavourable	36%	38%	26%	—N/a	–2%
18 Feb	Redfield & Wilton	2,000	Approve/Disapprove	39%	30%	31%	—N/a	+9%
11 Feb	Redfield & Wilton	2,000	Approve/Disapprove	39%	30%	31%	—N/a	+9%
4 Feb	Redfield & Wilton	2,000	Approve/Disapprove	38%	31%	31%	—N/a	+7%
29 Jan	YouGov	1,761	Well/Badly	35%	47%	—N/a	18%	–12%
28 Jan	Redfield & Wilton	2,000	Approve/Disapprove	40%	31%	29%	—N/a	+9%
19–22 Jan	Deltapoll	2,176	Well/Badly	42%	45%	—N/a	13%	–3%
21 Jan	Redfield & Wilton	2,000	Approve/Disapprove	38%	27%	35%	—N/a	+11%
14 Jan	Redfield & Wilton	2,000	Approve/Disapprove	38%	27%	35%	—N/a	+11%
12–14 Jan	Ipsos	1,087	Favourable/Unfavourable	28%	41%	31%	—N/a	–13%
7 Jan	Redfield & Wilton	2,000	Approve/Disapprove	44%	26%	30%	—N/a	+18%

==== 2023 ====
Date(s) conducted	Pollster/client	Sample size	Question wording	Approve	Disapprove	Neither	Don't know	Net approval
17 Dec	Redfield & Wilton	2,000	Approve/Disapprove	37%	33%	30%	—N/a	+4%
11–12 Dec	YouGov	2,001	Favourable/Unfavourable	37%	50%	—N/a	14%	–13%
10 Dec	Redfield & Wilton	2,000	Approve/Disapprove	36%	30%	34%	—N/a	+6%
8–10 Dec	Savanta	2,079	Favourable/Unfavourable	36%	37%	22%	6%	–1%
3 Dec	Redfield & Wilton	2,000	Approve/Disapprove	39%	32%	29%	—N/a	+7%
24–27 Nov	Deltapoll	1,996	Well/Badly	41%	46%	13%	—N/a	–5%
24–27 Nov	Ipsos	1,066	Favourable/Unfavourable	30%	42%	28%	—N/a	–12%
26 Nov	Redfield & Wilton	2,000	Approve/Disapprove	39%	31%	30%	—N/a	+8%
19 Nov	Redfield & Wilton	2,000	Approve/Disapprove	40%	29%	31%	—N/a	+12%
12 Nov	Redfield & Wilton	2,000	Approve/Disapprove	38%	29%	33%	—N/a	+9%
5 Nov	Redfield & Wilton	2,000	Approve/Disapprove	39%	29%	32%	—N/a	+10%
29 Oct	Redfield & Wilton	2,000	Approve/Disapprove	39%	29%	32%	—N/a	+10%
22 Oct	Redfield & Wilton	2,000	Approve/Disapprove	39%	28%	33%	—N/a	+11%
15 Oct	Redfield & Wilton	2,000	Approve/Disapprove	34%	28%	38%	—N/a	+6%
8 Oct	Redfield & Wilton	2,000	Approve/Disapprove	38%	28%	34%	—N/a	+10%
1 Oct	Redfield & Wilton	2,000	Approve/Disapprove	37%	30%	33%	—N/a	+7%
24 Sep	Redfield & Wilton	2,000	Approve/Disapprove	40%	31%	29%	—N/a	+9%
19 Sep	Ipsos	1,004	Satisfied/Dissatisfied	29%	51%	—N/a	—N/a	–22%
17 Sep	Redfield & Wilton	2,000	Approve/Disapprove	36%	28%	36%	—N/a	+8%
3 Sep	Redfield & Wilton	2,000	Approve/Disapprove	40%	25%	35%	—N/a	+10%
29–30 Aug	YouGov	2,210	Favourable/Unfavourable	33%	53%	—N/a	15%	–20%
27 Aug	Redfield & Wilton	2,000	Approve/Disapprove	41%	29%	30%	—N/a	+12%
25–27 Aug	Savanta	2,159	Favourable/Unfavourable	36%	37%	21%	6%	–1%
20 Aug	Redfield & Wilton	2,000	Approve/Disapprove	39%	27%	34%	—N/a	+12%
13 Aug	Redfield & Wilton	2,000	Approve/Disapprove	40%	27%	33%	—N/a	+13%
6 Aug	Redfield & Wilton	2,000	Approve/Disapprove	37%	31%	32%	—N/a	+6%
30 Jul	Redfield & Wilton	2,000	Approve/Disapprove	37%	30%	33%	—N/a	+7%
23 Jul	Redfield & Wilton	2,000	Approve/Disapprove	38%	30%	32%	—N/a	+8%
16 Jul	Redfield & Wilton	2,000	Approve/Disapprove	37%	29%	34%	—N/a	+8%
13–14 Jul	YouGov	2,151	Favourable/Unfavourable	35%	50%	—N/a	14%	–15%
9 Jul	Redfield & Wilton	2,000	Approve/Disapprove	36%	27%	37%	—N/a	+9%
2 Jul	Redfield & Wilton	2,000	Approve/Disapprove	33%	26%	41%	—N/a	+7%
25 Jun	Redfield & Wilton	2,000	Approve/Disapprove	37%	28%	35%	—N/a	+9%
18 Jun	Redfield & Wilton	2,000	Approve/Disapprove	38%	26%	36%	—N/a	+12%
11 Jun	Redfield & Wilton	2,000	Approve/Disapprove	40%	27%	33%	—N/a	+13%
4 Jun	Redfield & Wilton	2,000	Approve/Disapprove	40%	31%	29%	—N/a	+9%
28 May	Redfield & Wilton	2,000	Approve/Disapprove	37%	29%	34%	—N/a	+8%
21 May	Redfield & Wilton	2,000	Approve/Disapprove	36%	32%	32%	—N/a	+4%
14 May	Redfield & Wilton	2,000	Approve/Disapprove	33%	31%	36%	—N/a	+2%
9 May	Deltapoll	1,550	Well/Badly	48%	37%	—N/a	15%	+11%
7 May	Redfield & Wilton	2,000	Approve/Disapprove	38%	28%	34%	—N/a	+10%
30 Apr	Redfield & Wilton	2,000	Approve/Disapprove	39%	29%	32%	—N/a	+10%
23 Apr	Redfield & Wilton	2,000	Approve/Disapprove	34%	29%	37%	—N/a	+5%
16 Apr	Redfield & Wilton	2,000	Approve/Disapprove	35%	29%	36%	—N/a	+6%
9 Apr	Redfield & Wilton	2,000	Approve/Disapprove	38%	30%	32%	—N/a	+8%
2 Apr	Redfield & Wilton	2,000	Approve/Disapprove	37%	27%	36%	—N/a	+10%
29–30 Mar	YouGov	2,002	Good/Poor	22%	28%	34%	17%	–6%
26 Mar	Redfield & Wilton	2,000	Approve/Disapprove	33%	30%	37%	—N/a	+3%
19 Mar	Redfield & Wilton	2,000	Approve/Disapprove	38%	27%	35%	—N/a	+11%
12 Mar	Redfield & Wilton	2,000	Approve/Disapprove	36%	27%	37%	—N/a	+9%
5 Mar	Redfield & Wilton	2,000	Approve/Disapprove	37%	28%	35%	—N/a	+9%
26 Feb	Redfield & Wilton	2,000	Approve/Disapprove	37%	24%	39%	—N/a	+13%
18 Feb	Redfield & Wilton	2,000	Approve/Disapprove	38%	26%	36%	—N/a	+12%
12 Feb	Redfield & Wilton	2,000	Approve/Disapprove	37%	28%	35%	—N/a	+9%
5 Feb	Redfield & Wilton	2,000	Approve/Disapprove	34%	28%	38%	—N/a	+6%
29 Jan	Redfield & Wilton	2,000	Approve/Disapprove	37%	28%	35%	—N/a	+9%
22 Jan	Redfield & Wilton	2,000	Approve/Disapprove	32%	25%	43%	—N/a	+7%
17–18 Jan	YouGov	2,024	Favourable/Unfavourable	38%	46%	—N/a	15%	–8%
15 Jan	Redfield & Wilton	2,000	Approve/Disapprove	35%	29%	36%	—N/a	+6%
8 Jan	Redfield & Wilton	2,000	Approve/Disapprove	34%	28%	38%	—N/a	+6%
2–3 Jan	Redfield & Wilton	2,000	Approve/Disapprove	36%	26%	38%	—N/a	+10%

==== 2022 ====
Date(s) conducted	Pollster/client	Sample size	Question wording	Approve	Disapprove	Neither	Don't know	Net approval
11 Dec	Redfield & Wilton	2,000	Approve/Disapprove	37%	27%	—N/a	36%	+10%
4 Dec	Redfield & Wilton	2,000	Approve/Disapprove	37%	26%	—N/a	37%	+11%
24–25 Oct	YouGov	1,659	Favourable/Unfavourable	44%	41%	15%	—N/a	+3%
12 Oct	PeoplePolling	1,158	Favourable/Unfavourable	33%	41%	7%	20%	–8%
5–7 Oct	Opinium	2,023	Approve/Disapprove	38%	29%	26%	7%	+9%
7 Jul	Opinium	1,578	Favourable/Unfavourable	34%	35%	25%	5%	–1%
30 Jun	YouGov	1,807	Well/Badly	28%	54%	—N/a	18%	–26%
20–22 Apr	Opinium	2,002	Approve/Disapprove	29%	35%	36%	—N/a	–6%
10 Apr	Redfield & Wilton	2,000	Approve/Disapprove	27%	32%	34%	8%	–5%
28–30 Mar	Survation	2,033	Favourable/Unfavourable	33%	35%	23%	9%	–2%
27 Mar	Redfield & Wilton	2,000	Approve/Disapprove	30%	28%	32%	9%	+2%
23–25 Mar	Opinium	2,002	Approve/Disapprove	28%	32%	40%	—N/a	–4%
20 Mar	Redfield & Wilton	2,000	Approve/Disapprove	31%	31%	30%	8%	0%
9–15 Mar	Ipsos MORI	1,000	Satisfied/Dissatisfied	33%	43%	—N/a	24%	–10%
9–11 Mar	Opinium	2,007	Approve/Disapprove	28%	30%	42%	—N/a	–2%
9–11 Feb	Opinium	2,015	Approve/Disapprove	32%	32%	37%	—N/a	0%
27–28 Jan	Opinium	2,008	Approve/Disapprove	34%	33%	33%	—N/a	+1%
19–25 Jan	Ipsos MORI	1,059	Satisfied/Dissatisfied	33%	48%	—N/a	19%	–15%
17 Jan	Redfield & Wilton	2,000	Approve/Disapprove	30%	30%	33%	7%	0%
14–16 Jan	SavantaComRes	2,166	Favourable/Unfavourable	30%	34%	26%	9%	–4%
12–14 Jan	Opinium	2,005	Approve/Disapprove	36%	32%	32%	—N/a	+4%
12 Jan	Focaldata	1,003	Approve/Disapprove	29%	35%	30%	6%	–6%
10 Jan	Redfield & Wilton	2,000	Approve/Disapprove	30%	33%	30%	7%	–3%
7–10 Jan	Ipsos MORI	1,005	Favourable/Unfavourable	22%	40%	30%	7%	–18%

==== 2021 ====
Date(s) conducted	Pollster/client	Sample size	Question wording	Approve	Disapprove	Neither	Don't know	Net approval
25 Dec	Opinium	2,000	Approve/Disapprove	35%	31%	34%	—N/a	+4%
3–10 Dec	Ipsos MORI	1,005	Satisfied/Dissatisfied	28%	49%	—N/a	24%	–21%
9 Dec	Focaldata	1,001	Approve/Disapprove	26%	38%	29%	6%	–12%
8–9 Dec	Survation	1,178	Favourable/Unfavourable	33%	35%	27%	5%	–2%
22 Nov	YouGov	1,748	Well/Badly	24%	56%	—N/a	20%	–32%
15 Nov	Redfield & Wilton	2,000	Approve/Disapprove	26%	35%	33%	6%	–9%
4–6 Nov	J.L. Partners	1,021	Positively/Negatively	23%	39%	27%	11%	–16%
5–6 Nov	Opinium	1,840	Approve/Disapprove	29%	37%	34%	—N/a	–8%
11 Oct	Redfield & Wilton	2,000	Approve/Disapprove	26%	37%	31%	6%	–11%
4 Oct	Redfield & Wilton	2,000	Approve/Disapprove	25%	36%	32%	7%	–11%
27 Sep	Redfield & Wilton	2,000	Approve/Disapprove	24%	37%	32%	6%	–13%
24–26 Sep	YouGov	1,685	Good/Poor	10%	39%	34%	17%	–29%
17–23 Sep	Ipsos MORI	1,008	Satisfied/Dissatisfied	25%	50%	—N/a	25%	–25%
21–22 Sep	Survation	1,060	Favourable/Unfavourable	30%	42%	22%	6%	–12%
20 Sep	Redfield & Wilton	2,000	Approve/Disapprove	23%	39%	32%	2%	–15%
16–17 Sep	Opinium	2,000	Approve/Disapprove	30%	36%	34%	—N/a	–6%
9–16 Sep	Panelbase	3,938	Good/Bad	23%	39%	29%	9%	–16%
10–14 Sep	Survation	2,164	Favourable/Unfavourable	29%	38%	26%	7%	–9%
13 Sep	Redfield & Wilton	2,000	Approve/Disapprove	24%	42%	29%	5%	–18%
9–11 Sep	Opinium	2,059	Approve/Disapprove	29%	37%	35%	—N/a	–8%
6 Sep	Redfield & Wilton	2,000	Approve/Disapprove	27%	37%	31%	5%	–10%
3–6 Sep	Ipsos MORI	1,143	Favourable/Unfavourable	20%	44%	28%	8%	–24%
2–3 Sep	Deltapoll	1,589	Well/Badly	36%	49%	—N/a	15%	–13%
2–3 Sep	Opinium	2,014	Approve/Disapprove	29%	37%	35%	—N/a	–8%
29 Aug	Redfield & Wilton	2,000	Approve/Disapprove	23%	40%	32%	5%	–17%
23 Aug	Redfield & Wilton	2,000	Approve/Disapprove	23%	41%	30%	5%	–18%
19–20 Aug	Opinium	2,003	Approve/Disapprove	31%	37%	32%	—N/a	–6%
17–18 Aug	YouGov	1,703	Favourable/Unfavourable	26%	56%	—N/a	17%	–30%
16 Aug	Redfield & Wilton	2,000	Approve/Disapprove	24%	38%	31%	7%	–14%
13–15 Aug	SavantaComRes	2,075	Favourable/Unfavourable	26%	36%	27%	10%	–10%
9 Aug	Redfield & Wilton	2,000	Approve/Disapprove	24%	37%	32%	7%	–13%
30 Jul – 9 Aug	Ipsos MORI	1,113	Satisfied/Dissatisfied	27%	53%	—N/a	20%	–26%
5–6 Aug	Opinium	2,000	Approve/Disapprove	28%	39%	33%	—N/a	–11%
2 Aug	YouGov	1,781	Well/Badly	22%	59%	—N/a	19%	–37%
2 Aug	Redfield & Wilton	2,000	Approve/Disapprove	25%	40%	31%	4%	–15%
28–29 Jul	YouGov	1,700	Favourable/Unfavourable	29%	53%	—N/a	19%	–24%
23–26 Jul	Ipsos MORI	1,009	Favourable/Unfavourable	23%	38%	30%	9%	–15%
25 Jul	Redfield & Wilton	2,000	Approve/Disapprove	25%	40%	29%	6%	–15%
23 Jul	Survation	1,013	Favourable/Unfavourable	33%	35%	26%	7%	–2%
22–23 Jul	Opinium	2,000	Approve/Disapprove	30%	36%	33%	—N/a	–6%
19–20 Jul	Survation	1,032	Favourable/Unfavourable	27%	41%	25%	7%	–14%
19 Jul	Redfield & Wilton	2,000	Approve/Disapprove	26%	39%	31%	4%	–13%
16–18 Jul	SavantaComRes	2,127	Favourable/Unfavourable	26%	37%	29%	8%	–11%
5–13 Jul	Survation	2,119	Favourable/Unfavourable	28%	39%	25%	8%	–11%
12 Jul	Redfield & Wilton	2,000	Approve/Disapprove	24%	35%	35%	6%	–11%
8–9 Jul	Opinium	2,001	Approve/Disapprove	29%	36%	35%	—N/a	–7%
2–8 Jul	Ipsos MORI	1,053	Satisfied/Dissatisfied	27%	50%	—N/a	23%	–23%
5 Jul	YouGov	1,793	Well/Badly	21%	59%	—N/a	20%	–38%
18 Jun – 2 Jul	Panelbase	3,891	Good/Bad	20%	40%	29%	11%	–20%
5 Jul	Redfield & Wilton	2,000	Approve/Disapprove	24%	34%	34%	7%	–10%
28 Jun	Redfield & Wilton	2,000	Approve/Disapprove	28%	35%	32%	5%	–7%
25–28 Jun	Ipsos MORI	1,128	Favourable/Unfavourable	20%	45%	30%	6%	–25%
25–26 Jun	Survation	1,001	Favourable/Unfavourable	28%	37%	28%	7%	–9%
23–25 Jun	Opinium	2,000	Approve/Disapprove	31%	39%	30%	—N/a	–8%
21 Jun	Redfield & Wilton	2,000	Approve/Disapprove	25%	37%	34%	6%	–12%
13 Jun	Redfield & Wilton	2,000	Approve/Disapprove	25%	31%	37%	7%	–6%
11–13 Jun	SavantaComRes	2,108	Favourable/Unfavourable	29%	37%	26%	8%	–9%
10–12 Jun	Deltapoll	1,608	Well/Badly	38%	46%	—N/a	16%	–8%
10–11 Jun	Opinium	2,002	Approve/Disapprove	28%	38%	34%	—N/a	–10%
9–10 Jun	Survation	2,017	Favourable/Unfavourable	28%	37%	27%	8%	–9%
7 Jun	Redfield & Wilton	2,000	Approve/Disapprove	26%	34%	34%	7%	–8%
7 Jun	YouGov	1,626	Well/Badly	17%	61%	—N/a	22%	–44%
28 May – 3 Jun	Ipsos MORI	1,002	Satisfied/Dissatisfied	22%	51%	—N/a	27%	–29%
31 May	Redfield & Wilton	2,000	Approve/Disapprove	27%	37%	31%	5%	–10%
27–28 May	Opinium	2,004	Approve/Disapprove	29%	38%	33%	—N/a	–9%
27–28 May	Survation	1,010	Favourable/Unfavourable	26%	40%	27%	7%	–14%
27–28 May	Number Cruncher Politics	1,001	Satisfied/Dissatisfied	23%	48%	—N/a	29%	–25%
25–26 May	Survation	1,041	Favourable/Unfavourable	27%	38%	26%	8%	–11%
24 May	Redfield & Wilton	2,000	Approve/Disapprove	24%	35%	34%	6%	–11%
17 May	Redfield & Wilton	2,000	Approve/Disapprove	23%	35%	36%	5%	–12%
14–16 May	SavantaComRes	2,131	Favourable/Unfavourable	22%	40%	29%	9%	–18%
13–14 May	Opinium	2,004	Approve/Disapprove	28%	39%	33%	—N/a	–11%
10 May	YouGov	1,701	Well/Badly	17%	65%	—N/a	19%	–48%
10 May	Redfield & Wilton	2,000	Approve/Disapprove	26%	33%	34%	7%	–7%
7–10 May	Ipsos MORI	1,128	Favourable/Unfavourable	21%	43%	30%	7%	–22%
4–5 May	Panelbase	1,003	Good/Bad	29%	36%	30%	5%	–7%
3 May	Redfield & Wilton	2,000	Approve/Disapprove	30%	31%	31%	7%	–1%
28–30 Apr	Opinium	2,001	Approve/Disapprove	38%	30%	32%	—N/a	+8%
27–29 Apr	Survation	1,077	Favourable/Unfavourable	33%	37%	24%	6%	–4%
27–28 Apr	YouGov	1,803	Favourable/Unfavourable	30%	49%	—N/a	21%	–19%
26 Apr	Redfield & Wilton	2,000	Approve/Disapprove	31%	32%	31%	6%	–1%
22–26 Apr	BMG	1,500	Satisfied/Dissatisfied	23%	32%	32%	13%	–9%
21–23 Apr	Opinium	2,000	Approve/Disapprove	33%	32%	35%	—N/a	+1%
16–22 Apr	Ipsos MORI	1,090	Satisfied/Dissatisfied	36%	46%	—N/a	18%	–10%
19 Apr	Redfield & Wilton	2,000	Approve/Disapprove	30%	28%	34%	8%	+2%
15–19 Apr	Survation	1,008	Favourable/Unfavourable	34%	36%	25%	5%	–2%
16–18 Apr	SavantaComRes	2,094	Favourable/Unfavourable	29%	35%	28%	8%	–6%
12 Apr	YouGov	1,792	Well/Badly	26%	50%	—N/a	23%	–24%
12 Apr	Redfield & Wilton	2,000	Approve/Disapprove	29%	27%	37%	8%	+2%
8–10 Apr	Survation	1,009	Favourable/Unfavourable	33%	37%	26%	3%	–4%
8–10 Apr	Deltapoll	1,608	Well/Badly	44%	39%	—N/a	18%	+5%
8–9 Apr	Opinium	2,006	Approve/Disapprove	32%	30%	38%	—N/a	+2%
5 Apr	Redfield & Wilton	2,000	Approve/Disapprove	29%	27%	36%	7%	+2%
1–2 Apr	Redfield & Wilton	3,500	Approve/Disapprove	31%	29%	35%	6%	+2%
31 Mar – 1 Apr	YouGov	1,736	Favourable/Unfavourable	35%	46%	—N/a	19%	–11%
29 Mar	Redfield & Wilton	2,000	Approve/Disapprove	30%	28%	35%	7%	+2%
26–29 Mar	Ipsos MORI	1,128	Favourable/Unfavourable	26%	37%	31%	6%	–11%
25–27 Mar	Deltapoll	1,610	Well/Badly	44%	41%	—N/a	15%	+3%
25–26 Mar	Opinium	2,002	Approve/Disapprove	30%	35%	35%	—N/a	–5%
22 Mar	Redfield & Wilton	2,000	Approve/Disapprove	32%	23%	38%	8%	+9%
16–19 Mar	BMG	1,498	Satisfied/Dissatisfied	29%	27%	35%	10%	+2%
15 Mar	Redfield & Wilton	2,000	Approve/Disapprove	32%	25%	37%	7%	+7%
15 Mar	YouGov	1,640	Well/Badly	32%	45%	—N/a	23%	–13%
12–14 Mar	SavantaComRes	2,092	Favourable/Unfavourable	27%	34%	30%	10%	–7%
11–12 Mar	Opinium	2,001	Approve/Disapprove	34%	29%	37%	—N/a	+5%
5–12 Mar	Ipsos MORI	1,009	Satisfied/Dissatisfied	33%	42%	—N/a	26%	–9%
9–10 Mar	Survation	1,037	Favourable/Unfavourable	32%	35%	25%	9%	–3%
8–9 Mar	YouGov	1,672	Favourable/Unfavourable	31%	49%	—N/a	19%	–18%
8 Mar	Redfield & Wilton	2,000	Approve/Disapprove	30%	25%	38%	6%	+5%
1 Mar	Redfield & Wilton	1,500	Approve/Disapprove	31%	27%	36%	6%	+4%
24–26 Feb	Deltapoll	1,527	Well/Badly	41%	41%	—N/a	18%	0%
24–26 Feb	Opinium	2,003	Approve/Disapprove	33%	28%	39%	—N/a	+5%
23–25 Feb	Survation	1,002	Favourable/Unfavourable	32%	34%	27%	6%	–2%
22 Feb	Redfield & Wilton	2,000	Approve/Disapprove	30%	30%	36%	5%	0%
19–22 Feb	YouGov	1,683	Favourable/Unfavourable	34%	44%	—N/a	22%	–10%
15 Feb	Redfield & Wilton	2,000	Approve/Disapprove	30%	23%	39%	8%	+7%
15 Feb	YouGov	1,680	Well/Badly	35%	41%	—N/a	25%	–6%
12–14 Feb	SavantaComRes	2,170	Favourable/Unfavourable	29%	33%	29%	10%	–4%
11–12 Feb	Opinium	2,006	Approve/Disapprove	32%	30%	38%	—N/a	+2%
8–9 Feb	YouGov	1,790	Favourable/Unfavourable	37%	43%	—N/a	21%	–6%
8 Feb	Redfield & Wilton	2,000	Approve/Disapprove	34%	26%	34%	6%	+8%
5–6 Feb	Survation	1,003	Favourable/Unfavourable	35%	32%	27%	4%	+3%
29 Jan – 4 Feb	Ipsos MORI	1,056	Satisfied/Dissatisfied	40%	35%	—N/a	24%	+5%
1 Feb	Redfield & Wilton	2,000	Approve/Disapprove	33%	26%	36%	5%	+7%
28–29 Jan	Opinium	2,002	Approve/Disapprove	36%	27%	37%	—N/a	+9%
25 Jan	Redfield & Wilton	2,000	Approve/Disapprove	33%	24%	36%	7%	+9%
21–23 Jan	Deltapoll	1,632	Well/Badly	50%	36%	—N/a	15%	+14%
18 Jan	Redfield & Wilton	2,000	Approve/Disapprove	33%	25%	36%	6%	+8%
18 Jan	YouGov	1,630	Well/Badly	39%	37%	—N/a	24%	+2%
15–17 Jan	SavantaComRes	1,914	Favourable/Unfavourable	30%	32%	30%	8%	–2%
14–15 Jan	Opinium	2,003	Approve/Disapprove	37%	27%	36%	—N/a	+10%
12–13 Jan	Survation	1,033	Favourable/Unfavourable	38%	31%	25%	3%	+8%
11 Jan	Redfield & Wilton	2,000	Approve/Disapprove	33%	24%	36%	6%	+9%
6–7 Jan	Opinium	2,003	Approve/Disapprove	40%	25%	35%	—N/a	+15%

==== 2020 ====
Date(s) conducted	Pollster/client	Sample size	Question wording	Approve	Disapprove	Neither	Don't know	Net approval
26–30 Dec	Deltapoll	1,608	Well/Badly	41%	36%	—N/a	22%	+5%
20 Dec	YouGov	1,633	Well/Badly	40%	35%	—N/a	26%	+5%
17–18 Dec	YouGov	TBA	Favourable/Unfavourable	38%	40%	—N/a	21%	–2%
16–17 Dec	Opinium	2,001	Approve/Disapprove	37%	25%	—N/a	38%	+12%
11–13 Dec	SavantaComRes	2,026	Favourable/Unfavourable	31%	32%	29%	9%	–1%
4–11 Dec	Ipsos MORI	1,027	Satisfied/Dissatisfied	38%	33%	—N/a	29%	+5%
2–7 Dec	Survation	2,020	Favourable/Unfavourable	36%	27%	—N/a	29%	+9%
27 Nov – 8 Dec	Opinium	6,949	Approve/Disapprove	39%	22%	—N/a	40%	+17%
3–4 Dec	Opinium	2,002	Approve/Disapprove	35%	26%	—N/a	39%	+9%
2 Dec	Redfield & Wilton	2,000	Approve/Disapprove	34%	25%	33%	8%	+9%
26–28 Nov	Deltapoll	1,525	Well/Badly	44%	37%	—N/a	20%	+7%
21 Nov	YouGov	1,645	Well/Badly	45%	29%	—N/a	27%	+16%
19–20 Nov	Opinium	2,001	Approve/Disapprove	36%	25%	—N/a	39%	+11%
19 Nov	Redfield & Wilton	2,500	Approve/Disapprove	36%	23%	36%	6%	+13%
13–15 Nov	SavantaComRes	2,075	Favourable/Unfavourable	30%	31%	31%	8%	–1%
11 Nov	Redfield & Wilton	2,500	Approve/Disapprove	38%	24%	33%	5%	+14%
5–6 Nov	Opinium	2,003	Approve/Disapprove	41%	24%	—N/a	35%	+17%
29–30 Oct	YouGov	1,852	Favourable/Unfavourable	38%	40%	—N/a	21%	–2%
22–28 Oct	Ipsos MORI	1,007	Satisfied/Dissatisfied	45%	30%	—N/a	25%	+15%
28 Oct	Redfield & Wilton	3,000	Approve/Disapprove	35%	26%	34%	5%	+9%
26 Oct	YouGov	1,681	Well/Badly	44%	31%	—N/a	24%	+13%
22–24 Oct	Deltapoll	1,589	Well/Badly	48%	35%	—N/a	17%	+13%
22–23 Oct	Opinium	2,002	Approve/Disapprove	39%	25%	—N/a	36%	+14%
21–22 Oct	YouGov	1,638	Favourable/Unfavourable	41%	36%	—N/a	23%	+5%
21 Oct	Redfield & Wilton	3,000	Approve/Disapprove	35%	26%	33%	6%	+9%
16–18 Oct	SavantaComRes	2,274	Favourable/Unfavourable	31%	32%	29%	7%	–1%
8–9 Oct	Opinium	2,001	Approve/Disapprove	40%	24%	—N/a	37%	+16%
6–7 Oct	Redfield & Wilton	3,000	Approve/Disapprove	36%	23%	34%	7%	+13%
2–5 Oct	Ipsos MORI	1,109	Favourable/Unfavourable	29%	30%	32%	9%	–1%
30 Sep – 1 Oct	Redfield & Wilton	4,000	Approve/Disapprove	38%	22%	33%	7%	+16%
29–30 Sep	Yougov	1,700	Favourable/Unfavourable	43%	31%	—N/a	26%	+12%
28 Sep	YouGov	1,633	Well/Badly	46%	26%	—N/a	28%	+20%
24–25 Sep	Deltapoll	1,583	Well/Badly	49%	30%	—N/a	21%	+19%
23–25 Sep	Opinium	2,002	Approve/Disapprove	40%	21%	—N/a	38%	+19%
22–23 Sep	Redfield & Wilton	2,500	Approve/Disapprove	38%	23%	33%	7%	+15%
11–18 Sep	Ipsos MORI	1,013	Satisfied/Dissatisfied	43%	27%	—N/a	31%	+16%
15–16 Sep	Redfield & Wilton	2,500	Approve/Disapprove	38%	23%	32%	7%	+15%
15–16 Sep	Survation	1,003	Favourable/Unfavourable	36%	26%	30%	5%	+10%
9–11 Sep	Opinium	2,001	Approve/Disapprove	42%	21%	—N/a	37%	+21%
2–4 Sep	Survation	1,047	Favourable/Unfavourable	34%	28%	30%	6%	+6%
1–2 Sep	Redfield & Wilton	2,500	Approve/Disapprove	36%	21%	35%	7%	+15%
31 Aug	YouGov	1,657	Well/Badly	43%	25%	—N/a	32%	+18%
26–28 Aug	Opinium	2,002	Approve/Disapprove	38%	24%	—N/a	38%	+14%
24 Aug	Redfield & Wilton	2,000	Approve/Disapprove	39%	21%	32%	8%	+18%
21–24 Aug	Ipsos MORI	1,019	Favourable/Unfavourable	30%	28%	33%	8%	+2%
21 Aug	Survation	1,005	Favourable/Unfavourable	34%	25%	35%	6%	+9%
19 Aug	Redfield & Wilton	2,000	Approve/Disapprove	40%	21%	31%	8%	+19%
14–16 Aug	SavantaComRes	2,038	Favourable/Unfavourable	32%	30%	31%	7%	+2%
12 Aug	Redfield & Wilton	2,000	Approve/Disapprove	38%	22%	34%	6%	+16%
30 Jul – 4 Aug	Ipsos MORI	1,019	Satisfied/Dissatisfied	48%	26%	—N/a	26%	+22%
3 Aug	YouGov	3,326	Well/Badly	48%	21%	—N/a	31%	+27%
31 Jul – 3 Aug	Survation	1,019	Favourable/Unfavourable	37%	28%	27%	7%	+9%
29 Jul	Redfield & Wilton	2,000	Approve/Disapprove	38%	27%	31%	5%	+11%
23–24 Jul	Opinium	2,002	Approve/Disapprove	44%	22%	—N/a	34%	+22%
17–19 Jul	SavantaComRes	2,085	Favourable/Unfavourable	33%	28%	31%	8%	+5%
15 Jul	Redfield & Wilton	2,000	Approve/Disapprove	39%	21%	34%	5%	+18%
10–13 Jul	Ipsos MORI	1,118	Favourable/Unfavourable	33%	29%	31%	6%	+4%
8 Jul	Redfield & Wilton	2,000	Approve/Disapprove	41%	19%	32%	7%	+22%
4–6 Jul	YouGov	1,638	Well/Badly	47%	23%	—N/a	30%	+24%
3–6 Jul	Survation	1,012	Favourable/Unfavourable	35%	31%	26%	8%	+4%
1–3 Jul	Opinium	2,002	Approve/Disapprove	43%	22%	—N/a	35%	+21%
1 Jul	Redfield & Wilton	2,000	Approve/Disapprove	39%	21%	33%	6%	+18%
25–26 Jun	Opinium	2,001	Approve/Disapprove	46%	19%	—N/a	35%	+27%
25 Jun	Redfield & Wilton	2,000	Approve/Disapprove	41%	18%	35%	6%	+23%
24–25 Jun	Survation	2,003	Favourable/Unfavourable	35%	25%	30%	10%	+10%
18–19 Jun	Opinium	2,001	Approve/Disapprove	44%	22%	—N/a	34%	+22%
18 Jun	Redfield & Wilton	2,000	Approve/Disapprove	37%	19%	37%	7%	+18%
12–14 Jun	SavantaComRes	2,106	Favourable/Unfavourable	30%	29%	—N/a	31%	+1%
11–12 Jun	Opinium	2,001	Approve/Disapprove	45%	21%	—N/a	34%	+24%
11 Jun	Redfield & Wilton	1,500	Approve/Disapprove	41%	19%	33%	8%	+22%
9–10 Jun	Survation	1,062	Favourable/Unfavourable	37%	23%	31%	5%	+14%
5–10 Jun	Ipsos MORI	1,059	Satisfied/Dissatisfied	51%	20%	—N/a	29%	+31%
6–8 Jun	YouGov	1,666	Well/Badly	48%	21%	—N/a	32%	+27%
4–5 Jun	Opinium	2,002	Approve/Disapprove	45%	17%	—N/a	37%	+28%
3 Jun	Survation	1,018	Favourable/Unfavourable	39%	22%	30%	6%	+17%
29 May – 3 Jun	Ipsos MORI	1,291	Favourable/Unfavourable	36%	26%	31%	7%	+10%
28–29 May	Opinium	2,012	Approve/Disapprove	44%	19%	—N/a	37%	+25%
27–28 May	Deltapoll	1,557	Well/Badly	47%	27%	—N/a	27%	+20%
27 May	Redfield & Wilton	1,500	Approve/Disapprove	38%	19%	35%	7%	+19%
22–26 May	Survation	1,040	Favourable/Unfavourable	37%	21%	—N/a	42%	+16%
21–22 May	Opinium	2,008	Approve/Disapprove	47%	17%	—N/a	35%	+30%
15–18 May	Ipsos MORI	1,126	Favourable/Unfavourable	34%	26%	33%	7%	+8%
15–17 May	SavantaComRes	2,079	Favourable/Unfavourable	29%	28%	33%	9%	+1%
13–14 May	Opinium	2,007	Approve/Disapprove	42%	18%	—N/a	41%	+24%
13–14 May	YouGov	1,686	Favourable/Unfavourable	39%	30%	—N/a	9%	+9%
9–10 May	YouGov	1,674	Well/Badly	40%	17%	—N/a	44%	+23%
5–7 May	Opinium	2,005	Approve/Disapprove	35%	17%	—N/a	48%	+18%
5–6 May	YouGov	1,667	Favourable/Unfavourable	35%	30%	—N/a	35%	+5%
27 Apr – 1 May	Opinium	2,000	Approve/Disapprove	36%	18%	—N/a	46%	+18%
27–28 Apr	Survation	1,023	Satisfied/Dissatisfied	29%	16%	43%	12%	+13%
23–24 Apr	Deltapoll	1,518	Well/Badly	38%	26%	—N/a	35%	+12%
21–23 Apr	Opinium	2,005	Approve/Disapprove	32%	19%	—N/a	49%	+13%
15–17 Apr	Opinium	2,000	Approve/Disapprove	33%	17%	—N/a	50%	+16%
7–9 Apr	Opinium	2,005	Approve/Disapprove	34%	8%	—N/a	58%	+26%
7–9 Apr	BMG Research	1,541	Satisfied/Dissatisfied	31%	10%	—N/a	59%	+21%

=== Ed Davey ===
The following polls asked about voters' opinions on Ed Davey, leader of the Liberal Democrats since August 2020.

==== 2024 ====
Date(s) conducted	Pollster/client	Sample size	Question wording	Approve	Disapprove	Neither	Don't know	Net approval
21 May	Savanta	2,295	Favourable/Unfavourable	21%	28%	31%	20%	–7%
8–14 May	Ipsos	1,008	Satisfied/Dissatisfied	22%	38%	—N/a	41%	–16%
17 Apr	Opinium	1,943	Approve/Disapprove	13%	27%	37%	22%	–14%
3–15 Apr	Ipsos	1,072	Satisfied/Dissatisfied	18%	40%	—N/a	42%	–22%

==== 2022 ====
Date(s) conducted	Pollster/client	Sample size	Question wording	Approve	Disapprove	Neither	Don't know	Net approval
5–7 Oct	Opinium	2,023	Approve/Disapprove	16%	19%	41%	25%	–3%
9–15 Mar	Ipsos MORI	1,000	Satisfied/Dissatisfied	22%	28%	—N/a	50%	–6%
14–16 Jan	SavantaComRes	2,166	Favourable/Unfavourable	16%	23%	35%	26%	–7%

==== 2021 ====
Date(s) conducted	Pollster/client	Sample size	Question wording	Approve	Disapprove	Neither	Don't know	Net approval
3–10 Dec	Ipsos MORI	1,005	Satisfied/Dissatisfied	19%	33%	—N/a	48%	–14%
9–16 Sep	Panelbase	3,891	Good/Bad	14%	24%	35%	27%	–10%
19–20 Aug	Opinium	2,003	Approve/Disapprove	17%	23%	60%	—N/a	–6%
13–15 Aug	SavantaComRes	2,075	Favourable/Unfavourable	16%	23%	37%	23%	–7%
30 Jul – 9 Aug	Ipsos MORI	1,113	Satisfied/Dissatisfied	21%	32%	—N/a	47%	–11%
16–18 Jul	SavantaComRes	2,127	Favourable/Unfavourable	18%	21%	39%	22%	–3%
18 Jun – 2 Jul	Panelbase	3,891	Good/Bad	14%	20%	37%	29%	–6%
23–25 Jun	Opinium	2,000	Approve/Disapprove	22%	21%	57%	—N/a	+1%
11–13 Jun	SavantaComRes	2,108	Favourable/Unfavourable	17%	23%	39%	22%	–6%
28 May – 3 Jun	Ipsos MORI	1,002	Satisfied/Dissatisfied	16%	29%	—N/a	55%	–13%
31 May	Redfield & Wilton	2,000	Approve/Disapprove	14%	21%	44%	20%	–7%
14–16 May	SavantaComRes	2,131	Favourable/Unfavourable	16%	25%	37%	22%	–9%
4–5 May	Panelbase	1,003	Good/Bad	12%	30%	39%	20%	–18%
3 May	Redfield & Wilton	2,000	Approve/Disapprove	13%	22%	43%	21%	–9%
28–30 Apr	Opinium	2,001	Approve/Disapprove	18%	19%	63%	—N/a	–1%
22–26 Apr	BMG	1,500	Satisfied/Dissatisfied	11%	19%	43%	28%	–8%
21–23 Apr	Opinium	2,000	Approve/Disapprove	17%	21%	63%	—N/a	–4%
16–22 Apr	Ipsos MORI	1,090	Satisfied/Dissatisfied	18%	38%	—N/a	43%	–20%
16–18 Apr	SavantaComRes	2,094	Favourable/Unfavourable	15%	23%	41%	21%	–8%
8–9 Apr	Opinium	2,006	Approve/Disapprove	16%	23%	61%	—N/a	–7%
5 Apr	Redfield & Wilton	2,000	Approve/Disapprove	17%	22%	43%	20%	–5%
29 Mar	Redfield & Wilton	2,000	Approve/Disapprove	15%	19%	44%	22%	–4%
16–19 Mar	BMG	1,498	Satisfied/Dissatisfied	10%	17%	51%	23%	–7%
15 Mar	Redfield & Wilton	2,000	Approve/Disapprove	17%	20%	47%	17%	–3%
12–14 Mar	SavantaComRes	2,092	Favourable/Unfavourable	16%	23%	39%	21%	–7%
5–12 Mar	Ipsos MORI	1,009	Satisfied/Dissatisfied	15%	28%	—N/a	57%	–13%
8 Mar	Redfield & Wilton	2,000	Approve/Disapprove	14%	19%	47%	20%	–5%
1 Mar	Redfield & Wilton	1,500	Approve/Disapprove	13%	19%	46%	23%	–6%
22 Feb	Redfield & Wilton	2,000	Approve/Disapprove	12%	22%	43%	22%	–10%
15 Feb	Redfield & Wilton	2,000	Approve/Disapprove	11%	18%	47%	24%	–7%
12–14 Feb	SavantaComRes	2,170	Favourable/Unfavourable	18%	24%	36%	22%	–6%
11–12 Feb	Opinium	2,006	Approve/Disapprove	12%	26%	52%	—N/a	–14%
8 Feb	Redfield & Wilton	2,000	Approve/Disapprove	13%	20%	45%	22%	–7%
29 Jan – 4 Feb	Ipsos MORI	1,056	Satisfied/Dissatisfied	14%	40%	—N/a	47%	–26%
1 Feb	Redfield & Wilton	2,000	Approve/Disapprove	13%	20%	45%	22%	–7%
28–29 Jan	Opinium	2,002	Approve/Disapprove	15%	27%	59%	—N/a	–12%
25 Jan	Redfield & Wilton	2,000	Approve/Disapprove	13%	22%	43%	23%	–9%
18 Jan	Redfield & Wilton	2,000	Approve/Disapprove	13%	20%	43%	24%	–7%
15–17 Jan	SavantaComRes	1,914	Favourable/Unfavourable	15%	22%	39%	25%	–7%
14–15 Jan	Opinium	2,003	Approve/Disapprove	14%	25%	61%	—N/a	–9%
11 Jan	Redfield & Wilton	2,000	Approve/Disapprove	14%	21%	44%	22%	–7%
6–7 Jan	Opinium	2,003	Approve/Disapprove	17%	25%	59%	—N/a	–8%

==== 2020 ====
Date(s) conducted	Pollster/client	Sample size	Question wording	Approve	Disapprove	Neither	Don't know	Net approval
16–17 Dec	Opinium	2,001	Approve/Disapprove	17%	24%	—N/a	59%	–7%
11–13 Dec	Savanta ComRes	2,026	Favourable/Unfavourable	16%	23%	37%	24%	–7%
4–11 Dec	Ipsos MORI	1,027	Approve/Disapprove	15%	29%	—N/a	56%	–14%
3–4 Dec	Opinium	2,002	Approve/Disapprove	15%	25%	—N/a	61%	–10%
2 Dec	Redfield & Wilton	2,000	Approve/Disapprove	17%	20%	39%	24%	–3%
19–20 Nov	Opinium	2,001	Approve/Disapprove	15%	22%	—N/a	63%	–7%
13–15 Nov	SavantaComRes	2,075	Favourable/Unfavourable	14%	22%	38%	25%	–9%
11 Nov	Redfield & Wilton	2,500	Approve/Disapprove	13%	22%	44%	21%	–9%
5–6 Nov	Opinium	2,003	Approve/Disapprove	17%	23%	—N/a	61%	–6%
28 Oct	Redfield & Wilton	3,000	Approve/Disapprove	14%	22%	44%	20%	–8%
22–28 Oct	Ipsos MORI	1,007	Approve/Disapprove	20%	25%	—N/a	55%	–5%
22–23 Oct	Opinium	2,002	Approve/Disapprove	16%	22%	—N/a	62%	–6%
21 Oct	Redfield & Wilton	3,000	Approve/Disapprove	12%	21%	46%	22%	–9%
8–9 Oct	Opinium	2,001	Approve/Disapprove	13%	21%	—N/a	66%	–8%
23–25 Sep	Opinium	2,002	Approve/Disapprove	14%	23%	—N/a	63%	–9%
22–23 Sep	Redfield & Wilton	2,500	Approve/Disapprove	13%	22%	43%	21%	–9%
9–11 Sep	Opinium	2,001	Approve/Disapprove	17%	22%	—N/a	61%	–5%
26–28 Aug	Opinium	2,002	Approve/Disapprove	15%	24%	—N/a	61%	–9%
23–24 Jul	Opinium	2,002	Approve/Disapprove	15%	23%	—N/a	62%	–8%
8 Jul	Redfield & Wilton	2,000	Approve/Disapprove	19%	22%	40%	20%	–3%
1–3 Jul	Opinium	2,002	Approve/Disapprove	14%	20%	—N/a	65%	–6%
1 Jul	Redfield & Wilton	2,000	Approve/Disapprove	16%	19%	45%	20%	–3%
25–26 Jun	Opinium	2,001	Approve/Disapprove	14%	20%	—N/a	64%	–6%
25 Jun	Redfield & Wilton	2,000	Approve/Disapprove	20%	20%	41%	19%	0%
18–19 Jun	Opinium	2,001	Approve/Disapprove	16%	20%	—N/a	64%	–4%
11–12 Jun	Opinium	2,001	Approve/Disapprove	15%	23%	—N/a	62%	–8%
4–5 Jun	Opinium	2,002	Approve/Disapprove	15%	18%	—N/a	67%	–3%
28–29 May	Opinium	2,012	Approve/Disapprove	15%	23%	—N/a	63%	–8%
21–22 May	Opinium	2,007	Approve/Disapprove	14%	23%	—N/a	63%	–9%
13–14 May	Opinium	2,007	Approve/Disapprove	15%	19%	—N/a	66%	–4%
5–7 May	Opinium	2,005	Approve/Disapprove	13%	20%	—N/a	67%	–7%
27 Apr – 1 May	Opinium	2,000	Approve/Disapprove	13%	21%	—N/a	66%	–8%
21–23 Apr	Opinium	2,005	Approve/Disapprove	14%	21%	—N/a	65%	–7%
15–17 Apr	Opinium	2,000	Approve/Disapprove	15%	21%	—N/a	64%	–6%
7–9 Apr	Opinium	2,005	Approve/Disapprove	13%	20%	—N/a	67%	–7%
1–3 Apr	Opinium	2,000	Approve/Disapprove	12%	21%	—N/a	67%	–9%
26–27 Mar	Opinium	2,006	Approve/Disapprove	12%	21%	—N/a	67%	–9%
12–13 Mar	Opinium	2,005	Approve/Disapprove	12%	24%	—N/a	64%	–12%
12–14 Feb	Opinium	2,007	Approve/Disapprove	14%	24%	—N/a	62%	–10%
15–17 Jan	Opinium	2,002	Approve/Disapprove	14%	23%	—N/a	63%	–9%

== Approval ratings for former party leaders ==
=== Nicola Sturgeon ===
The following polls asked about voters' opinions on Nicola Sturgeon, leader of the Scottish National Party (SNP) and first minister of Scotland from November 2014 to March 2023. These polls asked the opinions of British voters, not specifically Scottish voters.

==== 2021 ====
Date(s) conducted	Pollster/client	Sample size	Question wording	Approve	Disapprove	Neither	Don't know	Net approval
9–16 Sep	Panelbase	3,938	Good/Bad	33%	33%	23%	10%	0%
13 Sep	Redfield & Wilton	2,000	Approve/Disapprove	30%	36%	27%	6%	–6%
6 Sep	Redfield & Wilton	2,000	Approve/Disapprove	29%	34%	32%	5%	–5%
3–6 Sep	Ipsos MORI	1,143	Favourable/Unfavourable	24%	43%	25%	7%	–19%
29 Aug	Redfield & Wilton	2,000	Approve/Disapprove	26%	36%	32%	5%	–10%
23 Aug	Redfield & Wilton	2,000	Approve/Disapprove	28%	38%	29%	5%	–10%
19–20 Aug	Opinium	2,003	Approve/Disapprove	34%	33%	33%	—N/a	+1%
16 Aug	Redfield & Wilton	2,000	Approve/Disapprove	29%	34%	32%	5%	–5%
9 Aug	Redfield & Wilton	2,000	Approve/Disapprove	30%	33%	30%	7%	–3%
2 Aug	Redfield & Wilton	2,000	Approve/Disapprove	29%	36%	30%	6%	–7%
25 Jul	Redfield & Wilton	2,000	Approve/Disapprove	30%	35%	28%	7%	–5%
19 Jul	Redfield & Wilton	2,000	Approve/Disapprove	33%	31%	29%	6%	+2%
12 Jul	Redfield & Wilton	2,000	Approve/Disapprove	34%	31%	29%	6%	+3%
5 Jul	Redfield & Wilton	2,000	Approve/Disapprove	33%	30%	29%	7%	+3%
18 Jun – 2 Jul	Panelbase	3,891	Good/Bad	34%	31%	25%	10%	+3%
28 Jun	Redfield & Wilton	2,000	Approve/Disapprove	35%	33%	27%	6%	+2%
25–28 Jun	Ipsos MORI	1,128	Favourable/Unfavourable	25%	43%	26%	6%	–18%
23–25 Jun	Opinium	2,000	Approve/Disapprove	36%	34%	30%	—N/a	+1%
13 Jun	Redfield & Wilton	2,000	Approve/Disapprove	32%	31%	29%	7%	+1%
7 Jun	Redfield & Wilton	2,000	Approve/Disapprove	35%	30%	29%	6%	+5%
31 May	Redfield & Wilton	2,000	Approve/Disapprove	29%	35%	29%	6%	–6%
24 May	Redfield & Wilton	2,000	Approve/Disapprove	32%	32%	29%	7%	0%
17 May	Redfield & Wilton	2,000	Approve/Disapprove	34%	31%	29%	6%	+3%
10 May	Redfield & Wilton	2,000	Approve/Disapprove	34%	29%	30%	7%	+5%
7–10 May	Ipsos MORI	1,128	Favourable/Unfavourable	25%	42%	26%	7%	–17%
4–5 May	Panelbase	1,003	Good/Bad	31%	40%	23%	6%	–9%
3 May	Redfield & Wilton	2,000	Approve/Disapprove	34%	32%	28%	7%	+2%
28–30 Apr	Opinium	2,000	Approve/Disapprove	36%	31%	32%	—N/a	+5%
26 Apr	Redfield & Wilton	2,000	Approve/Disapprove	34%	34%	26%	6%	0%
21–23 Apr	Opinium	2,000	Approve/Disapprove	35%	33%	32%	—N/a	+2%
19 Apr	Redfield & Wilton	2,000	Approve/Disapprove	33%	30%	29%	8%	+3%
12 Apr	Redfield & Wilton	2,000	Approve/Disapprove	32%	32%	29%	7%	0%
8–9 Apr	Opinium	2,006	Approve/Disapprove	34%	34%	32%	—N/a	0%
5 Apr	Redfield & Wilton	2,000	Approve/Disapprove	32%	30%	31%	7%	+2%
29 Mar	Redfield & Wilton	2,000	Approve/Disapprove	32%	32%	29%	7%	0%
15 Mar	Redfield & Wilton	2,000	Approve/Disapprove	36%	27%	31%	6%	+9%
8 Mar	Redfield & Wilton	2,000	Approve/Disapprove	34%	32%	29%	5%	+2%
1 Mar	Redfield & Wilton	1,500	Approve/Disapprove	35%	31%	28%	6%	+4%
22 Feb	Redfield & Wilton	2,000	Approve/Disapprove	37%	32%	26%	6%	+5%
15 Feb	Redfield & Wilton	2,000	Approve/Disapprove	41%	26%	27%	6%	+15%
11–12 Feb	Opinium	2,006	Approve/Disapprove	37%	31%	32%	—N/a	+6%
8 Feb	Redfield & Wilton	2,000	Approve/Disapprove	42%	28%	26%	4%	+14%
1 Feb	Redfield & Wilton	2,000	Approve/Disapprove	38%	29%	27%	5%	+9%
28–29 Jan	Opinium	2,002	Approve/Disapprove	41%	31%	28%	—N/a	+10%
25 Jan	Redfield & Wilton	2,000	Approve/Disapprove	41%	28%	27%	4%	+13%
18 Jan	Redfield & Wilton	2,000	Approve/Disapprove	43%	25%	27%	5%	+18%
14–15 Jan	Opinium	2,003	Approve/Disapprove	42%	29%	28%	—N/a	+13%
11 Jan	Redfield & Wilton	2,000	Approve/Disapprove	41%	26%	29%	4%	+15%
6–7 Jan	Opinium	2,003	Approve/Disapprove	43%	28%	30%	—N/a	+15%

==== 2020 ====
Date(s) conducted	Pollster/client	Sample size	Question wording	Approve	Disapprove	Neither	Don't know	Net approval
16–17 Dec	Opinium	2,001	Approve/Disapprove	38%	31%	—N/a	31%	+8%
3–4 Dec	Opinium	2,002	Approve/Disapprove	39%	31%	—N/a	31%	+9%
2 Dec	Redfield & Wilton	2,000	Approve/Disapprove	42%	23%	27%	6%	+19%
19–20 Nov	Opinium	2,001	Approve/Disapprove	41%	28%	—N/a	31%	+13%
11 Nov	Redfield & Wilton	2,500	Approve/Disapprove	42%	26%	27%	5%	+16%
5–6 Nov	Opinium	2,003	Approve/Disapprove	42%	26%	—N/a	32%	+16%
28 Oct	Redfield & Wilton	3,000	Approve/Disapprove	42%	26%	29%	5%	+16%
22–23 Oct	Opinium	2,002	Approve/Disapprove	43%	26%	—N/a	31%	+17%
21 Oct	Redfield & Wilton	3,000	Approve/Disapprove	42%	27%	27%	4%	+15%
8–9 Oct	Opinium	2,001	Approve/Disapprove	44%	25%	—N/a	31%	+19%
23–25 Sep	Opinium	2,002	Approve/Disapprove	44%	26%	—N/a	30%	+18%
22–23 Sep	Redfield & Wilton	2,500	Approve/Disapprove	41%	26%	28%	5%	+15%
9–11 Sep	Opinium	2,001	Approve/Disapprove	43%	28%	—N/a	29%	+15%
26–28 Aug	Opinium	2,002	Approve/Disapprove	43%	28%	—N/a	29%	+15%
23–24 Jul	Opinium	2,002	Approve/Disapprove	42%	28%	—N/a	31%	+14%
8 Jul	Redfield & Wilton	2,000	Approve/Disapprove	44%	28%	22%	6%	+16%
1–3 Jul	Opinium	2,002	Approve/Disapprove	42%	28%	—N/a	31%	+14%
1 Jul	Redfield & Wilton	2,000	Approve/Disapprove	45%	24%	26%	6%	+21%
25–26 Jun	Opinium	2,001	Approve/Disapprove	43%	26%	—N/a	31%	+17%
25 Jun	Redfield & Wilton	2,000	Approve/Disapprove	41%	26%	27%	7%	+15%
18–19 Jun	Opinium	2,001	Approve/Disapprove	42%	27%	—N/a	31%	+15%
11–12 Jun	Opinium	2,001	Approve/Disapprove	42%	28%	—N/a	30%	+14%
4–5 Jun	Opinium	2,002	Approve/Disapprove	43%	24%	—N/a	32%	+19%
28–29 May	Opinium	2,012	Approve/Disapprove	41%	28%	—N/a	31%	+13%
21–22 May	Opinium	2,008	Approve/Disapprove	44%	29%	—N/a	27%	+15%
13–14 May	Opinium	2,007	Approve/Disapprove	43%	28%	—N/a	29%	+15%
5–7 May	Opinium	2,005	Approve/Disapprove	37%	29%	—N/a	37%	+8%
27 Apr – 1 May	Opinium	2,000	Approve/Disapprove	37%	28%	—N/a	35%	+9%
21–23 Apr	Opinium	2,005	Approve/Disapprove	34%	31%	—N/a	35%	+3%
15–17 Apr	Opinium	2,000	Approve/Disapprove	34%	30%	—N/a	36%	+4%
7–9 Apr	Opinium	2,005	Approve/Disapprove	33%	30%	—N/a	37%	+3%
1–3 Apr	Opinium	2,000	Approve/Disapprove	32%	32%	—N/a	36%	0%
26–27 Mar	Opinium	2,006	Approve/Disapprove	33%	30%	—N/a	27%	+3%
12–13 Mar	Opinium	2,005	Approve/Disapprove	28%	39%	—N/a	33%	–11%
12–14 Feb	Opinium	2,007	Approve/Disapprove	28%	40%	—N/a	32%	–12%
15–17 Jan	Opinium	2,002	Approve/Disapprove	28%	40%	—N/a	32%	–12%

==== 2019 ====
Date(s) conducted	Pollster/client	Sample size	Question wording	Approve	Disapprove	Neither	Don't know	Net approval
13–14 Dec	YouGov	1,628	Approve/Disapprove	29%	54%	—N/a	17%	–25%

=== Liz Truss ===
The following polls asked about voters' opinions on Liz Truss, leader of the Conservative Party and Prime Minister of the United Kingdom from 6 September 2022 to 25 October 2022.

==== 2022 ====
Date(s) conducted	Pollster/client	Sample size	Question wording	Approve	Disapprove	Neither	Don't know	Net approval
23 Oct	Redfield & Wilton	2,000	Approve/Disapprove	6%	83%	9%	2%	–77%
19 Oct	Redfield & Wilton	1,500	Approve/Disapprove	10%	75%	12%	3%	–65%
18-19 Oct	Survation	1,617	Favourable/Unfavourable	12%	71%	13%	4%	–59%
16 Oct	Redfield & Wilton	2,000	Approve/Disapprove	9%	70%	16%	4%	–61%
14–16 Oct	YouGov	1,724	Favourable/Unfavourable	10%	80%	—N/a	10%	–70%
13 Oct	Redfield & Wilton	1,500	Approve/Disapprove	14%	62%	20%	3%	–48%
12 Oct	PeoplePolling	1,158	Favourable/Unfavourable	9%	65%	7%	19%	–56%
5–12 Oct	Ipsos MORI	1,001	Favourable/Unfavourable	16%	67%	17%	—N/a	–51%
9 Oct	Redfield & Wilton	2,000	Approve/Disapprove	16%	58%	22%	4%	–42%
5–7 Oct	Opinium	2,023	Approve/Disapprove	16%	64%	16%	4%	–48%
5 Oct	Redfield & Wilton	1,500	Approve/Disapprove	15%	59%	22%	4%	–44%
2 Oct	YouGov	1,791	Well/Badly	11%	71%	—N/a	19%	–60%
2 Oct	Redfield & Wilton	2,000	Approve/Disapprove	18%	51%	25%	5%	–33%
1–2 Oct	YouGov	1,751	Favourable/Unfavourable	14%	73%	—N/a	12%	–59%
28–30 Sep	Opinium	2,000	Approve/Disapprove	18%	55%	—N/a	27%	–37%
28–29 Sep	Redfield & Wilton	2,500	Approve/Disapprove	28%	42%	25%	6%	–14%
27–29 Sep	BMG Research	1,516	Satisfied/Dissatisfied	19%	48%	26%	8%	–29%
25 Sep	Redfield & Wilton	2,000	Approve/Disapprove	29%	35%	29%	7%	–6%
21 Sep	Redfield & Wilton	2,000	Approve/Disapprove	31%	27%	33%	8%	+4%
21 Sep	PeoplePolling	1,298	Favourable/Unfavourable	17%	59%	—N/a	27%	–42%
18 Sep	Redfield & Wilton	2,000	Approve/Disapprove	28%	25%	37%	10%	+3%
11 Sep	Savanta ComRes	2,272	Favourable/Unfavourable	34%	36%	23%	8%	–2%
7 Sep	PeoplePolling	1,162	Favourable/Unfavourable	15%	51%	—N/a	29%	–36%
7 Sep	Redfield & Wilton	2,000	Approve/Disapprove	22%	23%	40%	14%	–1%

=== Boris Johnson ===
The following polls asked about voters' opinions on Boris Johnson, leader of the Conservative Party and Prime Minister of the United Kingdom from 24 July 2019 to 6 September 2022.

==== 2022 ====
Date(s) conducted	Pollster/client	Sample size	Question wording	Approve	Disapprove	Neither	Don't know	Net approval
7 Jul	Opinium	1,578	Favourable/Unfavourable	22%	62%	13%	3%	–40%
30 Jun	YouGov	1,807	Well/Badly	23%	71%	—N/a	7%	–48%
20–22 Apr	Opinium	2,002	Approve/Disapprove	26%	59%	15%	—N/a	–33%
10 Apr	Redfield & Wilton	2,000	Approve/Disapprove	29%	52%	16%	3%	–23%
28–30 Mar	Survation	2,033	Favourable/Unfavourable	32%	51%	14%	3%	–19%
27 Mar	Redfield & Wilton	2,000	Approve/Disapprove	36%	44%	17%	3%	–8%
23–25 Mar	Opinium	2,002	Approve/Disapprove	28%	52%	20%	—N/a	–24%
20 Mar	Redfield & Wilton	2,000	Approve/Disapprove	32%	47%	18%	3%	–15%
9–15 Mar	Ipsos MORI	1,000	Satisfied/Dissatisfied	31%	59%	—N/a	10%	–28%
9–11 Mar	Opinium	2,007	Approve/Disapprove	27%	54%	19%	—N/a	–27%
9–11 Feb	Opinium	2,015	Approve/Disapprove	24%	58%	18%	—N/a	–34%
27–28 Jan	Opinium	2,008	Approve/Disapprove	24%	62%	14%	—N/a	–38%
19–25 Jan	Ipsos MORI	1,059	Satisfied/Dissatisfied	24%	70%	—N/a	6%	–46%
17 Jan	YouGov	1,785	Well/Badly	22%	73%	—N/a	5%	–51%
17 Jan	Redfield & Wilton	2,000	Approve/Disapprove	25%	56%	18%	2%	–31%
14–16 Jan	SavantaComRes	2,166	Favourable/Unfavourable	23%	60%	15%	3%	–37%
12–14 Jan	Opinium	2,005	Approve/Disapprove	22%	64%	14%	—N/a	–42%
12 Jan	Focaldata	1,003	Approve/Disapprove	20%	65%	13%	2%	–45%
10 Jan	Redfield & Wilton	2,000	Approve/Disapprove	31%	50%	16%	2%	–19%
7–10 Jan	Ipsos MORI	1,005	Favourable/Unfavourable	20%	56%	20%	5%	–36%

==== 2021 ====
Date(s) conducted	Pollster/client	Sample size	Question wording	Approve	Disapprove	Neither	Don't know	Net approval
20 Dec	YouGov	1,770	Well/Badly	23%	71%	—N/a	5%	–48%
3–10 Dec	Ipsos MORI	1,005	Satisfied/Dissatisfied	28%	65%	—N/a	7%	–37%
9 Dec	Focaldata	1,001	Approve/Disapprove	22%	62%	15%	1%	–40%
8–9 Dec	Survation	1,178	Favourable/Unfavourable	30%	53%	15%	2%	–23%
22 Nov	YouGov	1,748	Well/Badly	29%	64%	—N/a	7%	–35%
15 Nov	Redfield & Wilton	2,000	Approve/Disapprove	35%	45%	18%	2%	–10%
4–6 Nov	J.L. Partners	1,021	Positively/Negatively	30%	51%	16%	4%	–21%
5–6 Nov	Opinium	1,840	Approve/Disapprove	30%	50%	20%	—N/a	–20%
11 Oct	Redfield & Wilton	2,000	Approve/Disapprove	36%	42%	20%	2%	–6%
4 Oct	Redfield & Wilton	2,000	Approve/Disapprove	36%	42%	19%	2%	–6%
27 Sep	Redfield & Wilton	2,000	Approve/Disapprove	36%	42%	19%	2%	–6%
26 Sep	YouGov	1,804	Well/Badly	35%	60%	—N/a	6%	–25%
17–23 Sep	Ipsos MORI	1,008	Satisfied/Dissatisfied	39%	51%	—N/a	9%	–12%
21–22 Sep	Survation	1,060	Favourable/Unfavourable	39%	44%	16%	2%	–5%
20 Sep	Redfield & Wilton	2,000	Approve/Disapprove	37%	42%	20%	2%	–5%
16–17 Sep	Opinium	2,000	Approve/Disapprove	35%	48%	16%	—N/a	–13%
9–16 Sep	Panelbase	3,938	Good/Bad	33%	42%	21%	4%	–9%
10–14 Sep	Survation	2,164	Favourable/Unfavourable	38%	44%	15%	2%	–6%
13 Sep	Redfield & Wilton	2,000	Approve/Disapprove	38%	42%	18%	2%	–4%
9–11 Sep	Opinium	2,059	Approve/Disapprove	32%	49%	19%	—N/a	–17%
6 Sep	Redfield & Wilton	2,000	Approve/Disapprove	37%	41%	20%	2%	–4%
3–6 Sep	Ipsos MORI	1,143	Favourable/Unfavourable	28%	46%	21%	5%	–18%
2–3 Sep	Deltapoll	1,589	Well/Badly	47%	49%	—N/a	5%	–2%
2–3 Sep	Opinium	2,014	Approve/Disapprove	35%	45%	19%	—N/a	–10%
29 Aug	Redfield & Wilton	2,000	Approve/Disapprove	38%	40%	15%	2%	–2%
23 Aug	Redfield & Wilton	2,000	Approve/Disapprove	39%	45%	15%	2%	–6%
19–20 Aug	Opinium	2,003	Approve/Disapprove	33%	46%	20%	—N/a	–13%
17–18 Aug	YouGov	1,703	Favourable/Unfavourable	34%	59%	—N/a	7%	–25%
16 Aug	Redfield & Wilton	2,000	Approve/Disapprove	35%	44%	19%	2%	–9%
13–15 Aug	SavantaComRes	2,075	Favourable/Unfavourable	35%	42%	18%	5%	–7%
9 Aug	Redfield & Wilton	2,000	Approve/Disapprove	35%	46%	18%	1%	–11%
30 Jul – 9 Aug	Ipsos MORI	1,113	Satisfied/Dissatisfied	41%	52%	—N/a	8%	–11%
5–6 Aug	Opinium	2,000	Approve/Disapprove	34%	49%	17%	—N/a	–15%
2 Aug	YouGov	1,781	Well/Badly	38%	55%	—N/a	7%	–17%
2 Aug	Redfield & Wilton	2,000	Approve/Disapprove	39%	41%	17%	2%	–2%
28–29 Jul	YouGov	1,700	Favourable/Unfavourable	36%	55%	—N/a	10%	–19%
23–26 Jul	Ipsos MORI	1,009	Favourable/Unfavourable	27%	47%	22%	4%	–20%
25 Jul	Redfield & Wilton	2,000	Approve/Disapprove	32%	47%	16%	3%	–15%
23 Jul	Survation	1,013	Favourable/Unfavourable	37%	47%	15%	1%	–10%
22–23 Jul	Opinium	2,000	Approve/Disapprove	34%	47%	19%	—N/a	–13%
19–20 Jul	Survation	1,032	Favourable/Unfavourable	35%	47%	17%	1%	–12%
19 Jul	Redfield & Wilton	2,000	Approve/Disapprove	40%	41%	17%	1%	–1%
16–18 Jul	SavantaComRes	2,127	Favourable/Unfavourable	37%	41%	19%	3%	–4%
5–13 Jul	Survation	2,119	Favourable/Unfavourable	39%	42%	17%	2%	–3%
12 Jul	Redfield & Wilton	2,000	Approve/Disapprove	39%	39%	19%	1%	0%
8–9 Jul	Opinium	2,001	Approve/Disapprove	37%	45%	18%	—N/a	–8%
2–8 Jul	Ipsos MORI	1,053	Satisfied/Dissatisfied	38%	54%	—N/a	8%	–16%
5 Jul	YouGov	1,793	Well/Badly	39%	54%	—N/a	7%	–15%
5 Jul	Redfield & Wilton	2,000	Approve/Disapprove	39%	37%	22%	2%	+2%
18 Jun – 2 Jul	Panelbase	3,391	Good/Bad	36%	41%	19%	4%	–5%
28 Jun	Redfield & Wilton	2,000	Approve/Disapprove	38%	40%	20%	2%	–2%
25–28 Jun	Ipsos MORI	1,128	Favourable/Unfavourable	33%	47%	17%	3%	–14%
25–26 Jun	Survation	1,001	Favourable/Unfavourable	40%	40%	18%	1%	0%
23–25 Jun	Opinium	2,000	Approve/Disapprove	40%	44%	16%	—N/a	–4%
23–24 Jun	YouGov	1,758	Favourable/Unfavourable	39%	54%	—N/a	7%	–15%
21 Jun	Redfield & Wilton	2,000	Approve/Disapprove	41%	38%	19%	2%	+3%
13 Jun	Redfield & Wilton	2,000	Approve/Disapprove	43%	36%	19%	2%	+7%
11–13 Jun	SavantaComRes	2,108	Favourable/Unfavourable	38%	40%	18%	4%	–2%
10–12 Jun	Deltapoll	1,608	Well/Badly	51%	45%	—N/a	5%	+6%
10–11 Jun	Opinium	2,002	Approve/Disapprove	41%	43%	16%	—N/a	–2%
9–10 Jun	Survation	2,017	Favourable/Unfavourable	42%	40%	17%	2%	+2%
7 Jun	Redfield & Wilton	2,000	Approve/Disapprove	43%	34%	21%	2%	+9%
7 Jun	YouGov	1,626	Well/Badly	44%	48%	—N/a	8%	–4%
28 May – 3 Jun	Ipsos MORI	1,002	Satisfied/Dissatisfied	44%	47%	—N/a	8%	–3%
31 May	Redfield & Wilton	2,000	Approve/Disapprove	43%	36%	20%	2%	+7%
27–28 May	Opinium	2,004	Approve/Disapprove	38%	43%	19%	—N/a	–5%
27–28 May	Survation	1,010	Favourable/Unfavourable	42%	41%	16%	2%	+1%
27–28 May	Number Cruncher Politics	1,001	Satisfied/Dissatisfied	42%	45%	—N/a	12%	–3%
25–26 May	Survation	1,041	Favourable/Unfavourable	42%	38%	17%	2%	+4%
24 May	Redfield & Wilton	2,000	Approve/Disapprove	44%	36%	18%	2%	+8%
17 May	Redfield & Wilton	2,000	Approve/Disapprove	44%	34%	21%	1%	+10%
14–16 May	SavantaComRes	2,131	Favourable/Unfavourable	41%	35%	19%	5%	+6%
13–14 May	Opinium	2,004	Approve/Disapprove	43%	37%	20%	—N/a	+6%
10 May	YouGov	1,701	Well/Badly	48%	47%	—N/a	5%	+1%
10 May	Redfield & Wilton	2,000	Approve/Disapprove	48%	31%	19%	2%	+17%
7–10 May	Ipsos MORI	1,128	Favourable/Unfavourable	40%	40%	17%	3%	0%
4–5 May	Panelbase	1,003	Good/Bad	41%	39%	18%	2%	+2%
3 May	Redfield & Wilton	2,000	Approve/Disapprove	42%	36%	20%	2%	+6%
28–30 Apr	Opinium	2,001	Approve/Disapprove	37%	43%	20%	—N/a	–6%
27–29 Apr	Survation	1,077	Favourable/Unfavourable	39%	46%	13%	2%	–7%
27–28 Apr	YouGov	1,803	Favourable/Unfavourable	41%	52%	—N/a	8%	–11%
26 Apr	Redfield & Wilton	2,000	Approve/Disapprove	44%	35%	20%	1%	+9%
22–26 Apr	BMG	1,500	Satisfied/Dissatisfied	41%	38%	17%	4%	+3%
21–23 Apr	Opinium	2,000	Approve/Disapprove	41%	40%	19%	—N/a	+1%
16–22 Apr	Ipsos MORI	1,090	Satisfied/Dissatisfied	44%	50%	—N/a	6%	–6%
19 Apr	Redfield & Wilton	2,000	Approve/Disapprove	47%	32%	20%	2%	+15%
15–19 Apr	Survation	1,008	Favourable/Unfavourable	42%	43%	14%	1%	–1%
16–18 Apr	SavantaComRes	2,094	Favourable/Unfavourable	40%	38%	19%	3%	+3%
12 Apr	YouGov	1,792	Well/Badly	46%	47%	—N/a	7%	–1%
12 Apr	Redfield & Wilton	2,000	Approve/Disapprove	43%	34%	20%	2%	+9%
8–10 Apr	Survation	1,009	Favourable/Unfavourable	42%	41%	15%	1%	+1%
8–10 Apr	Deltapoll	1,608	Well/Badly	56%	40%	—N/a	3%	+16%
8–9 Apr	Opinium	2,006	Approve/Disapprove	41%	38%	21%	—N/a	+3%
5 Apr	Redfield & Wilton	2,000	Approve/Disapprove	47%	32%	20%	2%	+15%
1–2 Apr	Redfield & Wilton	3,500	Approve/Disapprove	44%	34%	20%	1%	+10%
31 Mar – 1 Apr	YouGov	1,736	Favourable/Unfavourable	46%	47%	—N/a	7%	–1%
29 Mar	Redfield & Wilton	2,000	Approve/Disapprove	45%	34%	20%	2%	+11%
25–27 Mar	Deltapoll	1,610	Well/Badly	52%	44%	—N/a	4%	+8%
25–26 Mar	Opinium	2,002	Approve/Disapprove	42%	41%	18%	—N/a	+1%
22 Mar	Redfield & Wilton	2,000	Approve/Disapprove	47%	29%	22%	2%	+18%
16–19 Mar	BMG	1,498	Satisfied/Dissatisfied	38%	44%	17%	2%	–6%
15 Mar	Redfield & Wilton	2,000	Approve/Disapprove	44%	31%	23%	3%	+13%
15 Mar	YouGov	1,640	Well/Badly	45%	48%	—N/a	7%	–3%
12–14 Mar	SavantaComRes	2,092	Favourable/Unfavourable	40%	37%	18%	5%	+3%
11–12 Mar	Opinium	2,001	Approve/Disapprove	45%	38%	17%	—N/a	+7%
5–12 Mar	Ipsos MORI	1,009	Satisfied/Dissatisfied	44%	51%	—N/a	5%	–7%
9–10 Mar	Survation	1,037	Favourable/Unfavourable	44%	43%	12%	1%	+1%
8–9 Mar	YouGov	1,672	Favourable/Unfavourable	41%	52%	—N/a	7%	–11%
8 Mar	Redfield & Wilton	2,000	Approve/Disapprove	45%	31%	22%	2%	+14%
1 Mar	Redfield & Wilton	1,500	Approve/Disapprove	44%	36%	20%	1%	+8%
24–26 Feb	Deltapoll	1,527	Well/Badly	54%	44%	—N/a	3%	+10%
24–26 Feb	Opinium	2,003	Approve/Disapprove	39%	41%	20%	—N/a	–2%
23–25 Feb	Survation	1,002	Favourable/Unfavourable	40%	41%	17%	1%	–1%
22 Feb	Redfield & Wilton	2,000	Approve/Disapprove	42%	39%	18%	1%	+3%
19–22 Feb	YouGov	1,683	Favourable/Unfavourable	40%	52%	—N/a	9%	–12%
15 Feb	Redfield & Wilton	2,000	Approve/Disapprove	39%	37%	22%	2%	+2%
15 Feb	YouGov	1,680	Well/Badly	41%	52%	—N/a	7%	–11%
12–14 Feb	SavantaComRes	2,170	Favourable/Unfavourable	35%	37%	23%	5%	–2%
11–12 Feb	Opinium	2,006	Approve/Disapprove	38%	44%	18%	—N/a	–6%
8–9 Feb	YouGov	1,790	Favourable/Unfavourable	38%	53%	—N/a	9%	–15%
8 Feb	Redfield & Wilton	2,000	Approve/Disapprove	42%	39%	18%	1%	+3%
5–6 Feb	Survation	1,003	Favourable/Unfavourable	40%	43%	15%	1%	–3%
29 Jan – 4 Feb	Ipsos MORI	1,056	Satisfied/Dissatisfied	42%	51%	—N/a	7%	–9%
1 Feb	Redfield & Wilton	2,000	Approve/Disapprove	39%	40%	21%	1%	–1%
28–29 Jan	Opinium	2,002	Approve/Disapprove	38%	46%	16%	—N/a	–8%
25 Jan	Redfield & Wilton	2,000	Approve/Disapprove	40%	38%	21%	1%	+2%
21–23 Jan	Deltapoll	1,632	Well/Badly	48%	47%	—N/a	5%	+1%
18 Jan	Redfield & Wilton	2,000	Approve/Disapprove	38%	40%	21%	1%	–2%
18 Jan	YouGov	1,630	Well/Badly	39%	54%	—N/a	6%	–15%
15–17 Jan	SavantaComRes	1,914	Favourable/Unfavourable	34%	43%	19%	3%	–9%
14–15 Jan	Opinium	2,003	Approve/Disapprove	34%	49%	17%	—N/a	–15%
12–13 Jan	Survation	1,033	Favourable/Unfavourable	36%	50%	12%	1%	–14%
11 Jan	Redfield & Wilton	2,000	Approve/Disapprove	38%	42%	19%	1%	–4%
6–7 Jan	Opinium	2,003	Approve/Disapprove	38%	44%	19%	—N/a	–6%
4–5 Jan	YouGov	1,704	Favourable/Unfavourable	37%	54%	—N/a	9%	–17%

==== 2020 ====
Date(s) conducted	Pollster/client	Sample size	Question wording	Approve	Disapprove	Neither	Don't know	Net approval
26–30 Dec	Deltapoll	1,608	Well/Badly	46%	49%	—N/a	5%	–3%
30 Dec	YouGov	1,633	Well/Badly	37%	56%	—N/a	7%	–19%
17–18 Dec	YouGov	TBA	Favourable/Unfavourable	35%	56%	—N/a	9%	–21%
16–17 Dec	Opinium	2,001	Approve/Disapprove	38%	44%	—N/a	19%	–6%
11–13 Dec	SavantaComRes	2,026	Favourable/Unfavourable	36%	42%	18%	4%	–6%
4–11 Dec	Ipsos MORI	1,027	Satisfied/Dissatisfied	42%	50%	—N/a	8%	–8%
27 Nov – 8 Dec	Opinium	6,949	Approve/Disapprove	38%	42%	—N/a	20%	–4%
2–7 Dec	Survation	2,020	Favourable/Unfavourable	39%	45%	—N/a	15%	–6%
3–4 Dec	Opinium	2,002	Approve/Disapprove	36%	44%	—N/a	19%	–8%
2 Dec	Redfield & Wilton	2,000	Approve/Disapprove	39%	40%	20%	2%	–1%
26–28 Nov	Deltapoll	1,525	Well/Badly	43%	51%	—N/a	6%	–8%
23 Nov	YouGov	1,645	Well/Badly	34%	58%	—N/a	8%	–24%
19–20 Nov	Opinium	2,001	Approve/Disapprove	35%	47%	—N/a	18%	–12%
19 Nov	Redfield & Wilton	2,500	Approve/Disapprove	36%	44%	19%	2%	–8%
13–15 Nov	SavantaComRes	2,075	Favourable/Unfavourable	36%	41%	19%	4%	–5%
11 Nov	Redfield & Wilton	2,500	Approve/Disapprove	37%	44%	18%	1%	–7%
5–6 Nov	Opinium	2,003	Approve/Disapprove	34%	48%	—N/a	19%	–14%
29–30 Oct	YouGov	1,852	Favourable/Unfavourable	35%	57%	—N/a	8%	–22%
28 Oct	Redfield & Wilton	3,000	Approve/Disapprove	35%	42%	20%	2%	–7%
22–28 Oct	Ipsos MORI	1,007	Satisfied/Dissatisfied	33%	59%	—N/a	8%	–27%
26 Oct	YouGov	1,681	Well/Badly	34%	59%	—N/a	7%	–25%
22–24 Oct	Deltapoll	1,589	Well/Badly	44%	51%	—N/a	4%	–7%
22–23 Oct	Opinium	2,002	Approve/Disapprove	33%	47%	—N/a	20%	–14%
21–22 Oct	YouGov	1,852	Favourable/Unfavourable	36%	55%	—N/a	9%	–19%
21 Oct	Redfield & Wilton	3,000	Approve/Disapprove	35%	45%	19%	2%	–10%
16–18 Oct	SavantaComRes	2,274	Favourable/Unfavourable	34%	43%	19%	3%	–9%
8–9 Oct	Opinium	2,001	Approve/Disapprove	34%	46%	—N/a	20%	–12%
6–7 Oct	Redfield & Wilton	3,000	Approve/Disapprove	37%	44%	18%	1%	–7%
2–5 Oct	Ipsos MORI	1,109	Favourable/Unfavouable	27%	48%	21%	4%	–21%
30 Sep – 1 Oct	Redfield & Wilton	4,000	Approve/Disapprove	35%	46%	18%	2%	–11%
29–30 Sep	YouGov	1,700	Favourable/Unfavourable	34%	55%	—N/a	10%	–21%
28 Sep	YouGov	1,633	Well/Badly	35%	57%	—N/a	8%	–22%
24–25 Sep	Deltapoll	1,583	Well/Badly	44%	54%	—N/a	2%	–10%
23–25 Sep	Opinium	2,002	Approve/Disapprove	35%	47%	—N/a	18%	–12%
22–23 Sep	Redfield & Wilton	2,500	Approve/Disapprove	37%	44%	18%	1%	–7%
11–18 Sep	Ipsos MORI	1,013	Satisfied/Dissatisfied	40%	54%	—N/a	6%	–14%
15–16 Sep	Redfield & Wilton	2,500	Approve/Disapprove	39%	42%	17%	2%	–3%
15–16 Sep	Survation	1,003	Favourable/Unfavourable	35%	49%	14%	1%	–13%
9–11 Sep	Opinium	2,001	Approve/Disapprove	38%	44%	—N/a	18%	–6%
2–4 Sep	Survation	1,047	Favourable/Unfavourable	38%	46%	15%	1%	–8%
1–2 Sep	Redfield & Wilton	2,500	Approve/Disapprove	42%	39%	18%	2%	+3%
31 Aug	YouGov	1,657	Well/Badly	39%	54%	—N/a	7%	–15%
26–28 Aug	Opinium	2,002	Approve/Disapprove	36%	44%	—N/a	20%	–8%
24 Aug	Redfield & Wilton	2,000	Approve/Disapprove	39%	38%	21%	2%	+1%
21–24 Aug	Ipsos MORI	1,019	Favourable/Unfavourable	29%	46%	21%	4%	–17%
21 Aug	Survation	1,005	Favourable/Unfavourable	40%	44%	15%	1%	–4%
19 Aug	Redfield & Wilton	2,000	Approve/Disapprove	41%	39%	18%	2%	+2%
14–16 Aug	SavantaComRes	2,038	Favourable/Unfavourable	38%	39%	20%	2%	–1%
12 Aug	Redfield & Wilton	2,000	Approve/Disapprove	45%	36%	19%	1%	+9%
30 Jul – 4 Aug	Ipsos MORI	1,019	Satisfied/Dissatisfied	47%	48%	—N/a	5%	–1%
3 Aug	YouGov	3,326	Well/Badly	45%	50%	—N/a	6%	–5%
31 Jul – 3 Aug	Survation	1,019	Favourable/Unfavourable	43%	43%	14%	1%	0%
29 Jul	Redfield & Wilton	2,000	Approve/Disapprove	45%	34%	20%	1%	+11%
23–24 Jul	Opinium	2,002	Approve/Disapprove	36%	45%	—N/a	19%	–9%
17–19 Jul	SavantaComRes	2,085	Favourable/Unfavourable	38%	40%	18%	3%	–2%
15 Jul	Redfield & Wilton	2,000	Approve/Disapprove	46%	36%	17%	2%	+10%
10–13 Jul	Ipsos MORI	1,118	Favourable/Unfavourable	41%	42%	15%	2%	-1%
8 Jul	Redfield & Wilton	2,000	Approve/Disapprove	43%	38%	17%	2%	+5%
6 Jul	YouGov	1,638	Well/Badly	44%	50%	—N/a	6%	–6%
4–6 Jul	YouGov	1,638	Well/Badly	44%	50%	—N/a	6%	–6%
3–6 Jul	Survation	1,012	Favourable/Unfavourable	43%	47%	10%	0%	–4%
1–3 Jul	Opinium	2,002	Approve/Disapprove	37%	44%	—N/a	19%	–7%
1 Jul	Redfield & Wilton	2,000	Approve/Disapprove	44%	37%	18%	2%	+7%
25–26 Jun	Opinium	2,001	Approve/Disapprove	37%	43%	—N/a	20%	–6%
25 Jun	Redfield & Wilton	2,000	Approve/Disapprove	46%	35%	18%	1%	+11%
24–25 Jun	Survation	2,003	Favourable/Unfavourable	44%	39%	15%	1%	+6%
18–19 Jun	Opinium	2,001	Approve/Disapprove	39%	44%	—N/a	16%	–5%
18 Jun	Redfield & Wilton	2,000	Approve/Disapprove	43%	37%	20%	1%	+5%
12–14 Jun	SavantaComRes	2,106	Favourable/Unfavourable	40%	38%	—N/a	22%	+2%
11–12 Jun	Opinium	2,001	Approve/Disapprove	37%	43%	—N/a	19%	–6%
11 Jun	Redfield & Wilton	1,500	Approve/Disapprove	42%	38%	19%	2%	+4%
9–10 Jun	Survation	1,062	Favourable/Unfavourable	43%	40%	15%	1%	+3%
5–10 Jun	Ipsos MORI	1,059	Satisfied/Dissatisfied	48%	49%	—N/a	3%	–1%
6–8 Jun	YouGov	1,666	Well/Badly	43%	50%	—N/a	7%	–7%
4–5 Jun	Opinium	2,002	Approve/Disapprove	37%	44%	—N/a	19%	–7%
3 Jun	Survation	1,018	Favourable/Unfavourable	44%	42%	13%	1%	+2%
29 May – 3 Jun	Ipsos MORI	1,291	Favourable/Unfavourable	39%	43%	15%	3%	–4%
28–29 May	Opinium	2,012	Approve/Disapprove	37%	42%	—N/a	21%	–5%
27–28 May	Deltapoll	1,557	Well/Badly	54%	44%	—N/a	3%	+10%
27 May	Redfield & Wilton	1,500	Favourable/Unfavourable	41%	40%	18%	1%	+1%
22–26 May	Survation	1,040	Favourable/Unfavourable	51%	34%	14%	<1%	+18%
21–22 May	Opinium	2,008	Approve/Disapprove	45%	39%	—N/a	16%	+6%
15–18 May	Ipsos MORI	1,126	Favourable/Unfavourable	45%	38%	15%	2%	+7%
15–17 May	SavantaComRes	2,079	Favourable/Unfavourable	46%	31%	19%	3%	+15%
13–14 May	Opinium	2,007	Approve/Disapprove	46%	36%	—N/a	18%	+10%
13–14 May	YouGov	1,686	Favourable/Unfavourable	50%	43%	—N/a	8%	+7%
9–10 May	YouGov	1,674	Well/Badly	57%	35%	—N/a	7%	+22%
5–7 May	Opinium	2,005	Approve/Disapprove	51%	31%	—N/a	17%	+20%
5–6 May	YouGov	1,667	Favourable/Unfavourable	54%	38%	—N/a	8%	+16%
27 Apr – 1 May	Opinium	2,000	Approve/Disapprove	51%	31%	—N/a	18%	+20%
27–28 Apr	Survation	1,023	Satisfied/Dissatisfied	61%	22%	16%	1%	+39%
26 Apr	Redfield & Wilton	1,500	Approve/Disapprove	56%	24%	18%	3%	+32%
23–24 Apr	Deltapoll	1,518	Well/Badly	67%	29%	—N/a	4%	+38%
21–23 Apr	Opinium	2,005	Approve/Disapprove	49%	31%	—N/a	20%	+18%
15–17 Apr	Opinium	2,000	Approve/Disapprove	55%	27%	—N/a	18%	+28%
14 Apr	Redfield & Wilton	1,500	Approve/Disapprove	62%	18%	18%	2%	+44%
11–13 Apr	YouGov	1,623	Well/Badly	66%	26%	—N/a	7%	+40%
1–3 Apr	Opinium	2,000	Approve/Disapprove	51%	22%	—N/a	23%	+29%
1–2 Apr	Redfield & Wilton	2,000	Approve/Disapprove	61%	22%	16%	1%	+39%
26–27 Mar	Deltapoll	1,545	Well/Badly	70%	25%	—N/a	5%	+45%
26–27 Mar	Opinium	2,006	Approve/Disapprove	55%	26%	—N/a	19%	+29%
17–18 Mar	YouGov	1,615	Favourable/Unfavourable	43%	46%	—N/a	12%	–3%
14–16 Mar	YouGov	1,637	Well/Badly	46%	42%	—N/a	12%	+4%
13–16 Mar	Ipsos MORI	1,003	Satisfied/Dissatisfied	52%	38%	—N/a	10%	+14%
13–16 Mar	Deltapoll	1,545	Well/Badly	52%	38%	—N/a	9%	+14%
12–13 Mar	YouGov	1,678	Favourable/Unfavourable	44%	46%	—N/a	9%	–2%
12–13 Mar	Opinium	2,005	Approve/Disapprove	42%	36%	—N/a	22%	+6%
4–5 Mar	YouGov	1,682	Favourable/Unfavourable	42%	49%	—N/a	9%	–7%
15–17 Feb	YouGov	1,646	Well/Badly	48%	38%	—N/a	14%	+10%
12–14 Feb	Opinium	2,007	Approve/Disapprove	44%	36%	—N/a	20%	+8%
18–20 Jan	YouGov	1,708	Well/Badly	42%	43%	—N/a	15%	–1%
15–17 Jan	Opinium	2,002	Approve/Disapprove	43%	36%	—N/a	21%	+7%

==== 2019 ====
Date(s) conducted	Pollster/client	Sample size	Question wording	Approve	Disapprove	Neither	Don't know	Net approval
21–23 Dec	YouGov	1,692	Well/Badly	46%	41%	—N/a	12%	+5%
13–14 Dec	YouGov	1,628	Approve/Disapprove	41%	52%	—N/a	7%	–11%

=== Siân Berry and Jonathan Bartley ===
The following polls asked about voters' opinions on Siân Berry and Jonathan Bartley, co-leaders of the Green Party from 4 September 2018 to 31 July 2021.

==== 2021 ====
Date(s) conducted	Pollster/client	Sample size	Question wording	Approve	Disapprove	Neither	Don't know	Net approval
31 May	Redfield & Wilton	2,000	Approve/Disapprove	19%	19%	38%	24%	0%
3 May	Redfield & Wilton	2,000	Approve/Disapprove	17%	20%	38%	26%	–3%
5 Apr	Redfield & Wilton	2,000	Approve/Disapprove	19%	19%	40%	22%	0%
29 Mar	Redfield & Wilton	2,000	Approve/Disapprove	17%	18%	39%	27%	–1%
15 Mar	Redfield & Wilton	2,000	Approve/Disapprove	18%	19%	42%	24%	–1%
8 Mar	Redfield & Wilton	2,000	Approve/Disapprove	17%	17%	43%	21%	0%
1 Mar	Redfield & Wilton	1,500	Approve/Disapprove	15%	16%	40%	29%	–1%
22 Feb	Redfield & Wilton	2,000	Approve/Disapprove	15%	19%	39%	26%	–4%
15 Feb	Redfield & Wilton	2,000	Approve/Disapprove	14%	15%	43%	27%	–1%
8 Feb	Redfield & Wilton	2,000	Approve/Disapprove	17%	17%	39%	28%	0%
1 Feb	Redfield & Wilton	2,000	Approve/Disapprove	15%	17%	41%	26%	–2%
25 Jan	Redfield & Wilton	2,000	Approve/Disapprove	14%	18%	38%	29%	–4%
18 Jan	Redfield & Wilton	2,000	Approve/Disapprove	15%	17%	39%	30%	–2%
11 Jan	Redfield & Wilton	2,000	Approve/Disapprove	16%	18%	39%	27%	–2%

==== 2020 ====
Date(s) conducted	Pollster/client	Sample size	Question wording	Approve	Disapprove	Neither	Don't know	Net approval
2 Dec	Redfield & Wilton	2,000	Approve/Disapprove	17%	16%	38%	29%	+1%
11 Nov	Redfield & Wilton	2,500	Approve/Disapprove	17%	17%	40%	26%	0%
28 Oct	Redfield & Wilton	3,000	Approve/Disapprove	17%	19%	41%	24%	–2%
21 Oct	Redfield & Wilton	3,000	Approve/Disapprove	15%	18%	41%	27%	–3%
23 Sep	Redfield & Wilton	2,500	Approve/Disapprove	16%	19%	38%	27%	–3%
22 Jul	Redfield & Wilton	2,000	Approve/Disapprove	20%	18%	39%	23%	+2%
1 Jul	Redfield & Wilton	2,000	Approve/Disapprove	19%	14%	41%	26%	+5%
25 Jun	Redfield & Wilton	2,000	Approve/Disapprove	21%	15%	41%	25%	+6%

=== Nigel Farage ===
The following polls asked about voters' opinions on Nigel Farage, leader of Reform UK (formerly named Brexit Party).

==== 2021 ====
Date(s) conducted	Pollster/client	Sample size	Question wording	Approve	Disapprove	Neither	Don't know	Net approval
6–7 Jan	Opinium	2,003	Approve/Disapprove	21%	44%	—N/a	35%	–23%

==== 2020 ====
Date(s) conducted	Pollster/client	Sample size	Question wording	Approve	Disapprove	Neither	Don't know	Net approval
16–17 Dec	Opinium	2,001	Approve/Disapprove	21%	43%	—N/a	36%	–22%
3–4 Dec	Opinium	2,002	Approve/Disapprove	19%	45%	—N/a	36%	–26%
19–20 Nov	Opinium	2,001	Approve/Disapprove	19%	46%	—N/a	35%	–27%
5–6 Nov	Opinium	2,003	Approve/Disapprove	18%	48%	—N/a	34%	–30%
22–23 Oct	Opinium	2,002	Approve/Disapprove	19%	42%	—N/a	39%	–23%
8–9 Oct	Opinium	2,001	Approve/Disapprove	18%	43%	—N/a	38%	–25%
23–25 Sep	Opinium	2,002	Approve/Disapprove	22%	44%	—N/a	34%	–22%
9–11 Sep	Opinium	2,001	Approve/Disapprove	23%	43%	—N/a	34%	–20%
26–28 Aug	Opinium	2,002	Approve/Disapprove	22%	43%	—N/a	35%	–21%
28–29 May	Opinium	2,012	Approve/Disapprove	22%	42%	—N/a	36%	–20%
21–22 May	Opinium	2,008	Approve/Disapprove	21%	43%	—N/a	36%	–22%
13–14 May	Opinium	2,007	Approve/Disapprove	20%	40%	—N/a	40%	–20%
5–7 May	Opinium	2,005	Approve/Disapprove	20%	42%	—N/a	37%	–22%
27 Apr – 1 May	Opinium	2,000	Approve/Disapprove	19%	42%	—N/a	40%	–23%
21–23 Apr	Opinium	2,005	Approve/Disapprove	18%	41%	—N/a	41%	–23%
15–17 Apr	Opinium	2,000	Approve/Disapprove	20%	40%	—N/a	40%	–20%
7–9 Apr	Opinium	2,005	Approve/Disapprove	18%	39%	—N/a	42%	–21%
1–3 Apr	Opinium	2,000	Approve/Disapprove	23%	39%	—N/a	38%	–16%
26–27 Mar	Opinium	2,006	Approve/Disapprove	19%	43%	—N/a	38%	–23%
12–13 Mar	Opinium	2,005	Approve/Disapprove	21%	42%	—N/a	37%	–21%
12–14 Feb	Opinium	2,007	Approve/Disapprove	27%	41%	—N/a	32%	–14%
15–17 Jan	Opinium	2,002	Approve/Disapprove	22%	42%	—N/a	36%	–20%

==== 2019 ====
Date(s) conducted	Pollster/client	Sample size	Question wording	Approve	Disapprove	Neither	Don't know	Net approval
13–14 Dec	YouGov	1,628	Approve/Disapprove	27%	63%	—N/a	10%	–36%

=== Jeremy Corbyn ===
The following polls asked about voters' opinions on Jeremy Corbyn, the leader of the Labour Party until 4 April 2020.

==== 2020 ====
Date(s) conducted	Pollster/client	Sample size	Question wording	Approve	Disapprove	Neither	Don't know	Net approval
1–3 Apr	Opinium	2,000	Approve/Disapprove	18%	54%	—N/a	28%	–36%
26–27 Mar	Opinium	2,006	Approve/Disapprove	19%	54%	—N/a	27%	–35%
13–16 Mar	Ipsos MORI	1,003	Satisfied/Dissatisfied	19%	68%	—N/a	13%	–49%
12–13 Mar	Opinium	2,005	Approve/Disapprove	19%	57%	—N/a	24%	–38%
12–14 Feb	Opinium	2,007	Approve/Disapprove	21%	59%	—N/a	20%	–38%
15–17 Jan	Opinium	2,002	Approve/Disapprove	19%	59%	—N/a	22%	–40%

==== 2019 ====
Date(s) conducted	Pollster/client	Sample size	Question wording	Approve	Disapprove	Neither	Don't know	Net approval
13–14 Dec	YouGov	1,628	Approve/Disapprove	21%	71%	—N/a	8%	–50%

== Preferred prime minister polling ==
Some opinion pollsters ask voters which of the Conservative and Labour party leaders they would prefer as prime minister. The questions differ slightly from pollster to pollster:

- Opinium: "Which, if any, of the following people do you think would be the best prime minister?"
- BMG Research: "If you had to choose between the two, who would you prefer to see as the next Prime Minister?"
- YouGov / Survation: "Which of the following do you think would make the best Prime Minister?"
- Ipsos MORI: "Who do you think would make the most capable Prime Minister, the Conservative’s Boris Johnson, or Labour’s Sir Keir Starmer?"
- ICM: "Putting aside which party you support, and only thinking about your impressions of them as leaders, which one of the following do you think would make the best Prime Minister for Britain?"
- Savanta: "Which of the following politicians do you think would make the best Prime Minister?"
- Redfield & Wilton: "At this moment, which of the following individuals do you think would be the better Prime Minister for the United Kingdom?"
- J.L. Partners: "Which of Boris Johnson and Keir Starmer is doing a better job overall at the moment?"
- Focaldata: "If you had to pick one of the following, who do you think would make the best Prime Minister?"
- Omnisis: "Which of the following do you think would be the better Prime Minister?"

=== Sunak v Starmer ===
View source data.

==== 2024 ====
Date(s) conducted	Pollster/client	Area	Sample size	Keir Starmer	Rishi Sunak	Unsure	Lead
31 Mar	Redfield & Wilton	GB	2,000	43%	29%	28%	14%
24 Mar	Redfield & Wilton	GB	2,000	41%	30%	29%	11%
17 Mar	Redfield & Wilton	GB	2,000	43%	28%	29%	15%
3 Mar	Redfield & Wilton	GB	2,000	41%	31%	28%	10%
25 Feb	Redfield & Wilton	GB	2,000	42%	29%	30%	13%
18 Feb	Redfield & Wilton	GB	2,000	44%	28%	28%	16%
11 Feb	Redfield & Wilton	GB	2,000	45%	29%	26%	16%
4 Feb	Redfield & Wilton	GB	2,000	45%	29%	26%	16%
28 Jan	Redfield & Wilton	GB	2,000	44%	30%	26%	14%
21 Jan	Redfield & Wilton	GB	2,000	42%	29%	29%	13%
14 Jan	Redfield & Wilton	GB	2,000	41%	31%	28%	10%
7 Jan	Redfield & Wilton	GB	2,000	45%	30%	25%	15%

==== 2023 ====
Date(s) conducted	Pollster/client	Area	Sample size	Keir Starmer	Rishi Sunak	Unsure	Lead
17 Dec	Redfield & Wilton	GB	2,000	39%	32%	29%	7%
10 Dec	Redfield & Wilton	GB	2,000	42%	30%	28%	12%
3 Dec	Redfield & Wilton	GB	2,000	42%	31%	27%	11%
26 Nov	Redfield & Wilton	GB	2,000	43%	31%	26%	12%
19 Nov	Redfield & Wilton	GB	2,000	43%	28%	29%	15%
12 Nov	Redfield & Wilton	GB	2,000	41%	31%	28%	10%
5 Nov	Redfield & Wilton	GB	2,000	42%	31%	26%	11%
29 Oct	Redfield & Wilton	GB	2,000	44%	30%	26%	14%
22 Oct	Redfield & Wilton	GB	2,000	44%	31%	26%	13%
15 Oct	Redfield & Wilton	GB	2,000	43%	32%	25%	11%
8 Oct	Redfield & Wilton	GB	2,000	42%	32%	26%	10%
1 Oct	Redfield & Wilton	GB	2,000	41%	32%	27%	9%
24 Sep	Redfield & Wilton	GB	2,000	43%	34%	23%	9%
17 Sep	Redfield & Wilton	GB	2,000	42%	31%	28%	11%
10 Sep	Redfield & Wilton	GB	2,000	43%	28%	30%	15%
3 Sep	Redfield & Wilton	GB	2,000	46%	29%	25%	17%
27 Aug	Redfield & Wilton	GB	2,000	44%	34%	22%	10%
20 Aug	Redfield & Wilton	GB	2,000	40%	33%	27%	7%
13 Aug	Redfield & Wilton	GB	2,000	43%	33%	23%	10%
6 Aug	Redfield & Wilton	GB	2,000	38%	33%	29%	5%
30 Jul	Redfield & Wilton	GB	2,000	40%	31%	29%	9%
23 Jul	Redfield & Wilton	GB	2,000	43%	35%	22%	8%
16 Jul	Redfield & Wilton	GB	2,000	43%	34%	23%	9%
9 Jul	Redfield & Wilton	GB	2,000	42%	32%	27%	10%
2 Jul	Redfield & Wilton	GB	2,000	38%	34%	28%	4%
25 Jun	Redfield & Wilton	GB	2,000	40%	33%	27%	7%
18 Jun	Redfield & Wilton	GB	2,000	41%	33%	26%	8%
11 Jun	Redfield & Wilton	GB	2,000	43%	33%	24%	10%
4 Jun	Redfield & Wilton	GB	2,000	42%	37%	21%	5%
28 May	Redfield & Wilton	GB	2,000	42%	34%	24%	8%
21 May	Redfield & Wilton	GB	2,000	38%	34%	28%	4%
14 May	Redfield & Wilton	GB	2,000	41%	36%	23%	5%
11–12 May	Omnisis	UK	1,355	41%	27%	31%	14%
7 May	Redfield & Wilton	GB	2,000	41%	35%	24%	6%
5 May	Omnisis	UK	1,355	41%	27%	31%	14%
30 Apr	Redfield & Wilton	GB	2,000	41%	37%	22%	4%
23 Apr	Redfield & Wilton	GB	2,000	38%	34%	27%	4%
16 Apr	Redfield & Wilton	GB	2,000	37%	36%	27%	1%
14 Apr	Opinium	UK	2,076	28%	27%	45%	1%
13 Apr	Omnisis	UK	1,340	33%	33%	34%	0%
9 Apr	Redfield & Wilton	GB	2,000	39%	37%	24%	2%
6 Apr	Omnisis	UK	1,328	36%	28%	36%	8%
6 Apr	Opinium	UK	2,081	28%	26%	46%	2%
6 Apr	YouGov	GB	2,042	31%	26%	40%	5%
2 Apr	Redfield & Wilton	GB	2,000	38%	35%	27%	3%
31 Mar	Opinium	UK	2,050	29%	26%	45%	3%
30 Mar	YouGov	GB	2,002	30%	26%	39%	4%
29 Mar	Omnsis	UK	1,344	41%	29%	30%	12%
29 Mar	Ipsos	UK	1,004	36%	37%	16%	1%
26 Mar	Redfield & Wilton	GB	2,000	39%	36%	25%	3%
24 Mar	Omnisis	UK	1,382	34%	37%	29%	3%
24 Mar	Survation	UK	1,023	38%	37%	26%	1%
22 Mar	YouGov	GB	2,026	31%	25%	40%	6%
19 Mar	Redfield & Wilton	GB	2,000	41%	34%	25%	7%
17 Mar	Opinium	GB	2,000	26%	28%	30%	2%
15 Mar	Omnisis	UK	1,126	36%	32%	32%	4%
12 Mar	Savanta	GB	2,093	37%	38%	25%	1%
12 Mar	Redfield & Wilton	GB	2,000	42%	34%	24%	6%
10 Mar	Omnisis	GB	1,323	38%	30%	32%	8%
5 Mar	Redfield & Wilton	GB	2,000	41%	35%	24%	6%
3 Mar	Omnisis	GB	1,284	36%	31%	33%	5%
1 Mar	YouGov	GB	2,073	32%	27%	42%	5%
26 Feb	Redfield & Wilton	GB	2,000	41%	32%	27%	9%
22 Feb	YouGov	GB	2,003	30%	25%	45%	5%
18 Feb	Redfield & Wilton	GB	2,000	41%	32%	27%	9%
16 Feb	Omnisis	GB	1,259	36%	31%	33%	5%
12 Feb	Redfield & Wilton	GB	2,000	40%	34%	26%	6%
10 Feb	Omnisis	GB	1,284	36%	27%	37%	9%
8 Feb	YouGov	GB	2,061	33%	25%	42%	8%
5 Feb	Redfield & Wilton	GB	2,000	41%	32%	27%	9%
3 Feb	Omnisis	GB	1,324	34%	28%	38%	6%
1 Feb	YouGov	GB	2,006	32%	22%	46%	10%
29 Jan	Redfield & Wilton	GB	2,000	41%	35%	24%	6%
26 Jan	Omnisis	GB	1,068	35%	28%	37%	7%
22 Jan	Redfield & Wilton	GB	2,000	40%	35%	25%	5%
19 Jan	Omnisis	GB	1,268	40%	27%	33%	13%
19 Jan	YouGov	GB	1,268	38%	33%	43%	5%
15 Jan	Redfield & Wilton	GB	2,000	37%	37%	26%	0%
11 Jan	YouGov	GB	1,691	32%	24%	44%	8%
8 Jan	Redfield & Wilton	GB	2,000	38%	37%	25%	1%
6 Jan	Omnisis	GB	1,285	33%	33%	34%	0%
5 Jan	YouGov	GB	1,709	31%	26%	43%	5%
2–3 Jan	Redfield & Wilton	GB	2,000	36%	38%	26%	2%

==== 2022 ====
Date(s) conducted	Pollster/client	Area	Sample size	Keir Starmer	Rishi Sunak	Unsure	Lead
21 Dec	YouGov	GB	1,672	32%	25%	43%	7%
15 Dec	YouGov	GB	1,690	32%	24%	44%	8%
11 Dec	Redfield & Wilton	GB	2,000	39%	36%	25%	3%
7 Dec	YouGov	GB	1,690	29%	24%	47%	5%
4 Dec	Redfield & Wilton	GB	2,000	40%	36%	24%	4%
30 Nov	YouGov	GB	1,637	30%	25%	45%	5%
27 Mar	Redfield & Wilton	GB	2,000	37%	28%	35%	9%
20 Mar	Redfield & Wilton	GB	2,000	37%	37%	26%	0%
21 Feb	Redfield & Wilton	GB	2,000	38%	34%	28%	4%
31 Jan	Redfield & Wilton	GB	2,000	39%	38%	23%	1%
17 Jan	Redfield & Wilton	GB	2,000	37%	38%	25%	1%

==== 2021 ====
Date(s) conducted	Pollster/client	Area	Sample size	Keir Starmer	Rishi Sunak	Unsure	Lead
15 Nov	Redfield & Wilton	GB	2,000	33%	38%	29%	5%
13 Sep	Redfield & Wilton	GB	2,000	31%	40%	30%	9%
6 Sep	Redfield & Wilton	GB	2,000	31%	39%	30%	8%
29 Aug	Redfield & Wilton	GB	2,000	28%	42%	31%	14%
23 Aug	Redfield & Wilton	GB	2,000	30%	39%	31%	9%
16 Aug	Redfield & Wilton	GB	2,000	29%	40%	30%	11%
9 Aug	Redfield & Wilton	GB	2,000	31%	40%	28%	9%
2 Aug	Redfield & Wilton	GB	2,000	30%	41%	29%	11%
25 Jul	Redfield & Wilton	GB	2,000	31%	41%	28%	10%
19 Jul	Redfield & Wilton	GB	2,000	30%	42%	27%	12%
12 Jul	Redfield & Wilton	GB	2,000	27%	43%	30%	16%
5 Jul	Redfield & Wilton	GB	2,000	29%	43%	28%	14%
28 Jun	Redfield & Wilton	GB	2,000	31%	42%	27%	11%
21 Jun	Redfield & Wilton	GB	2,000	28%	42%	30%	14%
13 Jun	Redfield & Wilton	GB	2,000	29%	43%	28%	14%
7 Jun	Redfield & Wilton	GB	2,000	26%	42%	32%	16%
31 May	Redfield & Wilton	GB	2,000	27%	44%	28%	17%
24 May	Redfield & Wilton	GB	2,000	28%	43%	28%	15%
17 May	Redfield & Wilton	GB	2,000	28%	44%	29%	16%
10 May	Redfield & Wilton	GB	2,000	26%	45%	29%	19%
3 May	Redfield & Wilton	GB	2,000	33%	40%	27%	7%
26 Apr	Redfield & Wilton	GB	2,000	30%	42%	28%	12%
19 Apr	Redfield & Wilton	GB	2,000	28%	41%	31%	13%
12 Apr	Redfield & Wilton	GB	2,000	30%	40%	29%	10%
5 Apr	Redfield & Wilton	GB	2,000	29%	41%	31%	12%
29 Mar	Redfield & Wilton	GB	2,000	29%	42%	29%	13%
22 Mar	Redfield & Wilton	GB	2,000	32%	39%	29%	7%
15 Mar	Redfield & Wilton	GB	2,000	31%	37%	32%	6%
5–12 Mar	Ipsos MORI	GB	1,009	37%	39%	24%	2%
8 Mar	Redfield & Wilton	GB	2,000	30%	40%	29%	10%
1 Mar	Redfield & Wilton	GB	1,500	31%	42%	27%	11%
22 Feb	Redfield & Wilton	GB	2,000	34%	41%	25%	7%
15 Feb	Redfield & Wilton	GB	2,000	33%	38%	29%	5%
8 Feb	Redfield & Wilton	GB	2,000	34%	40%	26%	6%
1 Feb	Redfield & Wilton	GB	2,000	34%	38%	29%	4%
25 Jan	Redfield & Wilton	GB	2,000	32%	39%	28%	7%
18 Jan	Redfield & Wilton	GB	2,000	33%	39%	28%	6%
11 Jan	Redfield & Wilton	GB	2,000	34%	38%	28%	4%

==== 2020 ====
Date(s) conducted	Pollster/client	Area	Sample size	Keir Starmer	Rishi Sunak	Unsure	Lead
19 Nov	Redfield & Wilton	GB	2,500	31%	41%	28%	10%
11 Nov	Redfield & Wilton	GB	2,500	34%	39%	27%	5%
28 Oct	Redfield & Wilton	GB	3,000	31%	39%	30%	8%
6–7 Oct	Redfield & Wilton	GB	3,000	32%	39%	28%	7%
30 Sep – 1 Oct	Redfield & Wilton	GB	4,000	33%	41%	26%	8%
22–23 Sep	Redfield & Wilton	GB	2,499	33%	41%	26%	8%
15–16 Sep	Redfield & Wilton	GB	2,500	33%	40%	27%	7%
1–2 Sep	Redfield & Wilton	GB	2,500	30%	43%	27%	13%
24 Aug	Redfield & Wilton	GB	2,000	33%	36%	31%	3%
19 Aug	Redfield & Wilton	GB	2,000	34%	37%	29%	3%
12 Aug	Redfield & Wilton	GB	2,000	30%	46%	25%	16%
29 Jul	Redfield & Wilton	GB	2,000	31%	42%	27%	11%
22 Jul	Redfield & Wilton	GB	2,000	31%	42%	26%	11%
15 Jul	Redfield & Wilton	GB	2,000	34%	44%	23%	10%
8 Jul	Redfield & Wilton	GB	2,000	34%	42%	23%	8%
1 Jul	Redfield & Wilton	GB	2,000	33%	40%	26%	7%
25 Jun	Redfield & Wilton	GB	2,000	33%	42%	25%	9%
18 Jun	Redfield & Wilton	GB	2,000	31%	39%	31%	8%

=== Truss vs Starmer ===
==== 2022 ====
View source data.

Date(s) conducted	Pollster/client	Area	Sample size	Liz Truss	Keir Starmer	None of these	Unsure	Lead
16 Oct	Redfield & Wilton	GB	2,000	13%	60%	—N/a	27%	47%
28–29 Sep	YouGov	GB	1,712	15%	44%	—N/a	39%	29%
6–7 Oct	YouGov	GB	1,737	14%	43%	—N/a	37%	29%
28–29 Sep	YouGov	GB	1,712	15%	44%	—N/a	39%	29%
6–7 Sep	YouGov	GB	1,688	25%	32%	—N/a	40%	7%
5 Sep	Liz Truss becomes leader of the Conservative Party, and Prime Minister the next day							
19 Aug	Opinium	GB	2,001	23%	31%	32%	14%	8%
14 Aug	Redfield & Wilton	GB	2,000	41%	37%	—N/a	22%	4%
7 Aug	Redfield & Wilton	GB	2,000	38%	35%	—N/a	27%	3%
31 Jul	Redfield & Wilton	GB	2,000	37%	36%	—N/a	27%	1%
24 Jul	Redfield & Wilton	GB	2,000	33%	38%	—N/a	29%	5%
17 Jul	Redfield & Wilton	GB	2,000	29%	41%	—N/a	30%	12%

=== Johnson vs Starmer ===
==== 2022 ====
Date(s) conducted	Pollster/client	Area	Sample size	Boris Johnson	Keir Starmer	None of these	Unsure	Refused	Lead
15 May	Redfield & Wilton	GB	2,000	33%	40%	—N/a	27%	—N/a	7%
8 May	Redfield & Wilton	GB	2,000	32%	39%	—N/a	29%	—N/a	7%
5–6 May	YouGov	GB	1,707	27%	33%	—N/a	35%	4%	6%
1 May	Redfield & Wilton	GB	2,000	33%	35%	—N/a	31%	—N/a	2%
26–27 Apr	YouGov	GB	1,779	26%	35%	—N/a	34%	5%	9%
22–26 Apr	Survation	UK	2,587	33%	40%	—N/a	27%	—N/a	7%
24 Apr	Redfield & Wilton	GB	2,000	32%	40%	—N/a	28%	—N/a	8%
20–22 Apr	Opinium	UK	2,002	27%	28%	33%	12%	—N/a	1%
19–20 Apr	YouGov	GB	2,079	27%	34%	—N/a	35%	4%	7%
17 Apr	Redfield & Wilton	GB	2,000	33%	39%	—N/a	29%	—N/a	6%
13–14 Apr	Deltapoll	GB	1,550	34%	41%	—N/a	25%	—N/a	7%
10 Apr	Redfield & Wilton	GB	2,000	35%	38%	—N/a	27%	—N/a	3%
6–8 Apr	Opinium	GB	2,004	25%	26%	36%	14%	—N/a	1%
6–7 Apr	YouGov	GB	1,826	27%	31%	—N/a	38%	4%	4%
3 Apr	Redfield & Wilton	GB	2,000	37%	37%	—N/a	26%	—N/a	Tie
29–30 Mar	YouGov	GB	2,006	27%	32%	—N/a	37%	4%	5%
28–30 Mar	Survation	UK	2,033	35%	37%	—N/a	27%	—N/a	2%
27 Mar	Redfield & Wilton	GB	2,000	38%	33%	—N/a	28%	—N/a	5%
23–25 Mar	Opinium	GB	2,002	26%	25%	34%	14%	—N/a	1%
22–23 Mar	YouGov	GB	1,810	28%	31%	—N/a	38%	3%	3%
20 Mar	Redfield & Wilton	GB	2,000	38%	36%	—N/a	27%	—N/a	2%
11–13 Mar	SavantaComRes	UK	2,192	34%	35%	—N/a	31%	—N/a	1%
9–11 Mar	Opinium	GB	2,007	27%	26%	32%	15%	—N/a	1%
7 Mar	Redfield & Wilton	GB	2,000	39%	35%	—N/a	26%	—N/a	4%
3–4 Mar	YouGov	GB	1,658	26%	33%	—N/a	37%	5%	7%
24–25 Feb	YouGov	GB	1,741	26%	34%	—N/a	37%	3%	8%
21 Feb	Redfield & Wilton	GB	2,000	29%	37%	—N/a	34%	—N/a	8%
9–11 Feb	Opinium	GB	2,015	24%	26%	35%	14%	—N/a	2%
1–2 Feb	YouGov	GB	1,661	25%	35%	—N/a	36%	4%	10%
31 Jan	Redfield & Wilton	GB	2,000	31%	43%	—N/a	26%	—N/a	12%
19–25 Jan	Ipsos MORI	GB	1,059	31%	49%	—N/a	20%	—N/a	18%
20–21 Jan	YouGov	GB	1,668	25%	35%	—N/a	36%	4%	10%
17 Jan	Redfield & Wilton	GB	2,000	29%	42%	—N/a	29%	—N/a	13%
12–13 Jan	YouGov	GB	1,690	22%	35%	—N/a	40%	4%	13%
11–12 Jan	YouGov	GB	1,666	23%	35%	—N/a	38%	4%	12%
6–7 Jan	YouGov	GB	1,744	28%	33%	—N/a	36%	4%	5%

==== 2021 ====
Date(s) conducted	Pollster/client	Area	Sample size	Boris Johnson	Keir Starmer	None of these	Unsure	Refused	Lead
19–20 Dec	YouGov	GB	1,790	22%	34%	—N/a	36%	4%	12%
14–15 Dec	YouGov	GB	1,714	23%	33%	—N/a	40%	4%	10%
10–11 Dec	Survation	UK	1,218	30%	39%	—N/a	31%	—N/a	9%
8–10 Dec	Opinium	UK	2,042	22%	29%	35%	13%	—N/a	7%
3–10 Dec	Ipsos MORI	GB	1,005	31%	44%	—N/a	25%	—N/a	13%
9 Dec	Focaldata	UK	1,001	34%	33%	—N/a	33%	—N/a	1%
6 Dec	Redfield & Wilton	GB	2,000	41%	32%	—N/a	27%	—N/a	9%
1–2 Dec	YouGov	GB	1,708	27%	31%	—N/a	38%	4%	4%
27–28 Nov	YouGov	GB	1,692	27%	28%	—N/a	41%	3%	1%
24–26 Nov	Opinium	UK	1,990	29%	27%	31%	14%	—N/a	2%
17–18 Nov	YouGov	GB	1,800	28%	30%	—N/a	37%	5%	2%
10–12 Nov	Opinium	UK	1,840	26%	25%	34%	14%	—N/a	1%
10–11 Nov	YouGov	GB	1,696	27%	29%	—N/a	41%	3%	2%
4–6 Nov	J.L. Partners	UK	1,021	41%	27%	—N/a	32%	—N/a	14%
5–6 Nov	Opinium	UK	1,840	28%	26%	34%	12%	—N/a	2%
27–29 Oct	Opinium	UK	2,001	33%	22%	33%	12%	—N/a	11%
12–13 Oct	YouGov	GB	1,659	31%	25%	—N/a	41%	3%	6%
11 Oct	Redfield & Wilton	GB	2,000	42%	31%	—N/a	27%	—N/a	11%
4 Oct	Redfield & Wilton	GB	2,000	42%	32%	—N/a	26%	—N/a	10%
17–23 sep	Ipsos MORI	GB	1,008	38%	38%	—N/a	24%	—N/a	Tie
16–17 Sep	Opinium	GB	2,000	32%	25%	31%	11%	—N/a	7%
15–16 Sep	YouGov	GB	1,635	31%	26%	—N/a	39%	5%	5%
10–14 Sep	Survation	UK	2,164	43%	32%	—N/a	25%	—N/a	11%
13 Sep	Redfield & Wilton	GB	2,000	44%	27%	—N/a	29%	—N/a	17%
9–11 Sep	Opinium	GB	2,059	32%	26%	31%	12%	—N/a	6%
6 Sep	Redfield & Wilton	GB	2,000	42%	30%	—N/a	28%	—N/a	12%
2–3 Sep	YouGov	GB	1,653	32%	27%	—N/a	36%	5%	5%
2–3 Sep	Opinium	GB	2,014	32%	24%	31%	14%	—N/a	8%
29 Aug	Redfield & Wilton	GB	2,000	45%	27%	—N/a	28%	—N/a	18%
25–26 Aug	YouGov	GB	1,754	32%	27%	—N/a	37%	4%	5%
23 Aug	Redfield & Wilton	GB	2,000	41%	30%	—N/a	29%	—N/a	11%
19–20 Aug	Opinium	GB	2,003	31%	26%	30%	13%	—N/a	5%
16 Aug	Redfield & Wilton	GB	2,000	41%	29%	—N/a	30%	—N/a	12%
13–15 Aug	SavantaComRes	UK	2,075	40%	28%	—N/a	32%	—N/a	15%
11–12 Aug	YouGov	GB	2,169	30%	28%	—N/a	39%	3%	2%
9 Aug	Redfield & Wilton	GB	2,000	43%	32%	—N/a	25%	—N/a	11%
5–6 Aug	Opinium	GB	2,000	31%	25%	32%	12%	—N/a	6%
5–6 Aug	YouGov	GB	1,730	31%	27%	—N/a	37%	5%	4%
2 Aug	Redfield & Wilton	GB	2,000	44%	28%	—N/a	28%	—N/a	16%
28–29 Jul	YouGov	GB	1,637	33%	28%	—N/a	37%	3%	5%
25 Jul	Redfield & Wilton	GB	2,000	40%	30%	—N/a	30%	—N/a	10%
23 Jul	Survation	UK	1,013	40%	33%	—N/a	27%	—N/a	7%
22–23 Jul	Opinium	GB	2,000	30%	26%	31%	12%	—N/a	4%
19–20 Jul	Survation	UK	1,032	41%	33%	—N/a	25%	—N/a	8%
19 Jul	Redfield & Wilton	GB	2,000	44%	30%	—N/a	26%	—N/a	14%
16–18 Jun	SavantaComRes	UK	2,127	43%	28%	—N/a	29%	—N/a	15%
15–16 Jul	YouGov	GB	1,761	37%	27%	—N/a	31%	5%	10%
5–13 Jul	Survation	UK	2,119	45%	28%	—N/a	27%	—N/a	17%
12 Jul	Redfield & Wilton	GB	2,000	43%	29%	—N/a	28%	—N/a	14%
8–9 Jul	Opinium	GB	2,001	33%	24%	30%	12%	—N/a	9%
7–8 Jul	YouGov	GB	2,054	33%	25%	—N/a	37%	5%	8%
5 Jul	Redfield & Wilton	GB	2,000	44%	29%	—N/a	27%	—N/a	15%
29–30 Jun	YouGov	GB	1,762	33%	27%	—N/a	36%	4%	6%
28 Jun	Redfield & Wilton	GB	2,000	42%	31%	—N/a	27%	—N/a	11%
25–26 Jun	Survation	UK	2,001	45%	28%	—N/a	28%	—N/a	17%
23–25 Jun	Opinium	GB	2,000	35%	26%	28%	11%	—N/a	9%
21 Jun	Redfield & Wilton	GB	2,000	46%	26%	—N/a	28%	—N/a	20%
16–17 Jun	YouGov	GB	1,642	36%	26%	—N/a	33%	5%	10%
13 Jun	Redfield & Wilton	GB	2,000	47%	28%	—N/a	25%	—N/a	19%
11–13 Jun	SavantaComRes	UK	2,108	44%	28%	—N/a	28%	—N/a	16%
10–11 Jun	Opinium	GB	2,002	37%	24%	28%	11%	—N/a	13%
9–10 Jun	Survation	UK	2,017	46%	28%	—N/a	26%	—N/a	18%
7 Jun	Redfield & Wilton	GB	2,000	48%	25%	—N/a	28%	—N/a	23%
31 May	Redfield & Wilton	GB	2,000	48%	25%	—N/a	27%	—N/a	23%
27–28 May	Opinium	GB	2,004	33%	27%	28%	12%	—N/a	6%
27–28 May	YouGov	GB	1,705	37%	25%	—N/a	35%	3%	12%
27–28 May	Survation	UK	1,010	45%	29%	—N/a	25%	—N/a	16%
25–26 May	Survation	UK	1,041	45%	28%	—N/a	27%	—N/a	17%
24 May	Redfield & Wilton	GB	2,000	47%	26%	—N/a	27%	—N/a	21%
19–20 May	YouGov	GB	1,699	40%	24%	—N/a	33%	4%	16%
17 May	Redfield & Wilton	GB	2,000	50%	24%	—N/a	26%	—N/a	26%
14–16 May	SavantaComRes	UK	2,131	48%	24%	—N/a	28%	—N/a	24%
13–14 May	Opinium	GB	2,004	40%	23%	24%	12%	—N/a	17%
10 May	Redfield & Wilton	GB	2,000	50%	26%	—N/a	25%	—N/a	24%
3 May	Redfield & Wilton	GB	2,000	45%	30%	—N/a	25%	—N/a	15%
28–30 Apr	Opinium	GB	2,001	32%	29%	24%	14%	—N/a	3%
27–29 Apr	Survation	UK	1,077	41%	33%	—N/a	26%	—N/a	8%
26 Apr	Redfield & Wilton	GB	2,000	46%	29%	—N/a	25%	—N/a	17%
22–26 Apr	BMG	GB	1,500	40%	24%	11%	24%	—N/a	16%
21–23 Apr	Opinium	GB	2,000	35%	25%	26%	14%	—N/a	10%
19 Apr	Redfield & Wilton	GB	2,000	47%	28%	—N/a	26%	—N/a	19%
15–19 Apr	Survation	UK	1,008	43%	34%	—N/a	23%	—N/a	9%
16–18 Apr	SavantaComRes	UK	2,094	44%	30%	—N/a	26%	—N/a	14%
13–14 Apr	YouGov	GB	1,689	34%	26%	—N/a	36%	4%	8%
12 Apr	Redfield & Wilton	GB	2,000	47%	28%	—N/a	25%	—N/a	19%
8–10 Apr	Survation	UK	1,009	46%	32%	—N/a	22%	—N/a	14%
8–9 Apr	Opinium	GB	2,006	38%	25%	22%	15%	—N/a	13%
7–8 Apr	YouGov	GB	1,708	35%	29%	—N/a	32%	4%	6%
5 Apr	Redfield & Wilton	GB	2,000	48%	28%	—N/a	25%	—N/a	20%
31 Mar – 1 Apr	YouGov	GB	1,736	35%	29%	—N/a	33%	3%	6%
29 Mar	Redfield & Wilton	GB	2,000	47%	28%	—N/a	25%	—N/a	19%
25–26 Mar	YouGov	GB	1,742	37%	27%	—N/a	34%	2%	10%
25–26 Mar	Opinium	GB	2,002	33%	27%	25%	15%	—N/a	6%
22 Mar	Redfield & Wilton	GB	2,000	50%	26%	—N/a	23%	—N/a	24%
18–19 Mar	YouGov	GB	1,692	35%	29%	—N/a	33%	3%	6%
16–19 Mar	BMG	GB	1,498	35%	28%	24%	13%	—N/a	7%
15 Mar	Redfield & Wilton	GB	2,000	48%	28%	—N/a	24%	—N/a	20%
12–14 Mar	SavantaComRes	UK	2,092	44%	27%	—N/a	29%	—N/a	17%
11–12 Mar	Opinium	GB	2,001	37%	25%	23%	15%	—N/a	12%
5–12 Mar	Ipsos MORI	GB	1,009	47%	37%	—N/a	16%	—N/a	10%
9–10 Mar	YouGov	GB	1,680	34%	29%	—N/a	35%	3%	5%
9–10 Mar	Survation	UK	1,006	45%	31%	—N/a	24%	—N/a	14%
8 Mar	Redfield & Wilton	GB	2,000	50%	27%	—N/a	23%	—N/a	23%
3–4 Mar	YouGov	GB	1,715	36%	28%	—N/a	33%	2%	8%
1 Mar	Redfield & Wilton	GB	1,500	48%	30%	—N/a	22%	—N/a	18%
25–26 Feb	YouGov	GB	1,637	35%	31%	—N/a	34%	3%	4%
24–26 Feb	Opinium	GB	2,003	33%	25%	27%	15%	—N/a	8%
23–25 Feb	Survation	UK	1,002	43%	32%	—N/a	24%	—N/a	11%
22 Feb	Redfield & Wilton	GB	2,000	47%	33%	—N/a	20%	—N/a	14%
17–18 Feb	YouGov	GB	1,663	34%	30%	—N/a	32%	4%	4%
15 Feb	Redfield & Wilton	GB	2,000	43%	32%	—N/a	25%	—N/a	11%
12–14 Feb	SavantaComRes	UK	2,170	43%	27%	—N/a	30%	—N/a	16%
11–12 Feb	Opinium	GB	2,006	32%	27%	25%	—N/a	—N/a	5%
9–10 Feb	YouGov	GB	1,660	33%	31%	—N/a	34%	2%	2%
8 Feb	Redfield & Wilton	GB	2,000	45%	32%	—N/a	23%	—N/a	13%
5–6 Feb	Survation	UK	1,003	40%	34%	—N/a	26%	—N/a	6%
2–3 Feb	YouGov	GB	1,684	33%	33%	—N/a	30%	4%	Tie
1 Feb	Redfield & Wilton	GB	2,000	42%	32%	—N/a	26%	—N/a	10%
28–29 Jan	Opinium	GB	2,003	33%	29%	25%	13%	—N/a	4%
26–27 Jan	YouGov	GB	1,721	29%	34%	—N/a	34%	4%	5%
25 Jan	Redfield & Wilton	GB	2,000	43%	31%	—N/a	26%	—N/a	12%
21–22 Jan	YouGov	GB	1,703	31%	33%	—N/a	32%	4%	2%
18 Jan	Redfield & Wilton	GB	2,000	42%	34%	—N/a	25%	—N/a	8%
15–17 Jan	SavantaComRes	UK	1,914	38%	31%	—N/a	32%	—N/a	7%
14–15 Jan	Opinium	GB	2,003	29%	32%	25%	14%	—N/a	3%
13–14 Jan	YouGov	GB	1,702	29%	34%	—N/a	34%	3%	5%
12–13 Jan	Survation	UK	1,033	39%	37%	—N/a	25%	—N/a	2%
11 Jan	Redfield & Wilton	GB	2,000	40%	34%	—N/a	26%	—N/a	6%
6–7 Jan	Opinium	GB	2,003	32%	32%	23%	13%	—N/a	Tie
4–5 Jan	YouGov	GB	1,704	30%	35%	—N/a	32%	3%	5%

==== 2020 ====
Date(s) conducted	Pollster/client	Area	Sample size	Boris Johnson	Keir Starmer	None of these	Unsure	Refused	Lead
16–17 Dec	Opinium	GB	2,001	33%	31%	22%	13%	—N/a	2%
15–16 Dec	YouGov	GB	1,898	30%	35%	—N/a	33%	2%	5%
11–13 Dec	SavantaComRes	UK	2,026	39%	31%	—N/a	30%	—N/a	8%
27 Nov – 8 Dec	Opinium	GB	6,949	32%	30%	23%	15%	—N/a	2%
2–7 Dec	Survation	UK	2,020	39%	36%	—N/a	25%	—N/a	3%
3–4 Dec	Opinium	GB	2,002	32%	30%	24%	14%	—N/a	2%
2–3 Dec	YouGov	GB	1,706	29%	33%	—N/a	35%	3%	4%
2 Dec	Redfield & Wilton	GB	2,000	43%	32%	—N/a	26%	—N/a	11%
26–27 Nov	YouGov	GB	1,696	29%	34%	—N/a	35%	3%	5%
19–20 Nov	Opinium	GB	2,001	31%	30%	23%	15%	—N/a	1%
19 Nov	Redfield & Wilton	GB	2,500	39%	34%	—N/a	26%	—N/a	5%
17–18 Nov	YouGov	GB	1,700	29%	34%	—N/a	34%	3%	5%
13–15 Nov	SavantaComRes	UK	2,075	41%	31%	—N/a	28%	—N/a	10%
11–12 Nov	YouGov	GB	1,632	28%	34%	—N/a	36%	2%	6%
11 Nov	Redfield & Wilton	GB	2,500	40%	36%	—N/a	24%	—N/a	4%
5–6 Nov	Opinium	GB	2,003	31%	33%	23%	13%	—N/a	2%
5–6 Nov	Survation	UK	1,034	40%	33%	—N/a	27%	—N/a	7%
4–5 Nov	YouGov	GB	1,665	26%	36%	—N/a	36%	2%	10%
28 Oct	Redfield & Wilton	GB	3,000	39%	34%	—N/a	27%	—N/a	5%
22–23 Oct	Opinium	GB	2,002	30%	31%	22%	16%	—N/a	1%
21–22 Oct	YouGov	GB	1,665	29%	35%	—N/a	33%	3%	6%
21 Oct	Redfield & Wilton	GB	3,000	39%	34%	—N/a	26%	—N/a	5%
16–18 Oct	SavantaComRes	UK	2,274	40%	31%	—N/a	29%	—N/a	9%
14–15 Oct	YouGov	GB	1,675	29%	35%	—N/a	33%	3%	6%
8–9 Oct	Opinium	GB	2,001	32%	33%	21%	14%	—N/a	1%
6–7 Oct	Redfield & Wilton	GB	3,000	42%	35%	—N/a	23%	—N/a	7%
6–7 Oct	YouGov	GB	1,673	29%	33%	—N/a	35%	3%	4%
5–6 Oct	Survation	UK	1,022	37%	38%	—N/a	25%	—N/a	1%
30 Sep – 1 Oct	Redfield & Wilton	GB	4,000	41%	36%	—N/a	23%	—N/a	5%
29–30 Sep	YouGov	GB	1,700	27%	36%	—N/a	35%	3%	9%
23–25 Sep	Opinium	GB	2,002	32%	36%	17%	15%	—N/a	4%
23–24 Sep	YouGov	GB	1,623	30%	37%	—N/a	30%	3%	7%
22–23 Sep	Redfield & Wilton	GB	2,499	42%	36%	—N/a	22%	—N/a	6%
18–20 Sep	SavantaComRes	UK	2,109	41%	35%	—N/a	24%	—N/a	6%
16–17 Sep	YouGov	GB	1,618	30%	35%	—N/a	31%	4%	5%
15–16 Sep	Survation	UK	996	39%	39%	—N/a	23%	—N/a	Tie
15–16 Sep	Redfield & Wilton	GB	2,500	43%	35%	—N/a	22%	—N/a	8%
9–11 Sep	Opinium	GB	2,001	33%	32%	21%	14%	—N/a	1%
3–4 Sep	YouGov	GB	1,633	31%	34%	—N/a	31%	4%	3%
2–4 Sep	Survation	UK	1,020	41%	36%	—N/a	23%	—N/a	5%
26–28 Aug	Opinium	GB	2,002	34%	32%	18%	16%	—N/a	2%
24 Aug	Redfield & Wilton	GB	2,000	42%	33%	—N/a	25%	—N/a	9%
24–25 Aug	YouGov	GB	1,669	30%	33%	—N/a	34%	4%	3%
19 Aug	Redfield & Wilton	GB	2,000	41%	35%	—N/a	24%	—N/a	6%
18–19 Aug	YouGov	GB	1,652	31%	35%	—N/a	31%	3%	4%
14–16 Aug	SavantaComRes	UK	2,086	43%	30%	—N/a	27%	—N/a	13%
13–14 Aug	Opinium	GB	2,005	34%	33%	19%	14%	—N/a	1%
12 Aug	Redfield & Wilton	GB	2,000	47%	33%	—N/a	20%	—N/a	14%
11–12 Aug	YouGov	GB	1,634	32%	32%	—N/a	32%	4%	Tie
4–5 Aug	YouGov	GB	1,606	32%	34%	—N/a	31%	3%	2%
31 Jul – 3 Aug	Survation	UK	1,019	42%	35%	—N/a	23%	—N/a	7%
30–31 Jul	Opinium	GB	2,002	35%	34%	17%	14%	—N/a	1%
29 Jul	Redfield & Wilton	GB	2,000	48%	32%	—N/a	20%	—N/a	16%
23–24 Jul	Opinium	GB	2,002	35%	33%	16%	16%	—N/a	2%
22 Jul	Redfield & Wilton	GB	2,000	45%	33%	—N/a	22%	—N/a	12%
17–19 Jul	SavantaComRes	UK	2,085	40%	31%	—N/a	29%	—N/a	9%
15–17 Jul	Opinium	GB	2,003	36%	34%	17%	14%	—N/a	2%
15 Jul	Redfield & Wilton	GB	2,000	48%	33%	—N/a	19%	—N/a	15%
10–12 Jul	Survation	UK	1,957	43%	33%	—N/a	22%	—N/a	10%
9–10 Jul	Opinium	GB	2,002	36%	33%	15%	16%	—N/a	3%
8 Jul	Redfield & Wilton	GB	2,000	46%	35%	—N/a	18%	—N/a	11%
3–6 Jul	Survation	UK	1,012	41%	37%	—N/a	22%	—N/a	4%
1–3 Jul	Opinium	GB	2,002	34%	33%	18%	15%	—N/a	1%
1 Jul	Redfield & Wilton	GB	2,000	49%	33%	—N/a	18%	—N/a	16%
25–26 Jun	Opinium	GB	2,001	35%	37%	14%	14%	—N/a	2%
25 Jun	Redfield & Wilton	GB	2,000	50%	31%	—N/a	19%	—N/a	19%
24–25 Jun	Survation	UK	2,003	46%	30%	—N/a	24%	—N/a	16%
18–19 Jun	Opinium	GB	2,001	35%	34%	16%	15%	—N/a	1%
18 Jun	Redfield & Wilton	GB	2,000	43%	31%	—N/a	26%	—N/a	12%
12–14 Jun	SavantaComRes	UK	2,106	46%	26%	—N/a	28%	—N/a	20%
11–12 Jun	Opinium	UK	2,001	36%	35%	15%	13%	—N/a	1%
11–12 Jun	YouGov	GB	1,693	33%	33%	—N/a	31%	3%	Tie
9–10 Jun	Survation	UK	1,062	43%	33%	—N/a	24%	—N/a	10%
5–10 Jun	Ipsos MORI	GB	1,059	43%	38%	—N/a	19%	—N/a	5%
4–5 Jun	Opinium	GB	2,002	36%	35%	16%	13%	—N/a	1%
3 Jun	Survation	UK	1,018	44%	35%	—N/a	21%	—N/a	9%
29–30 May	YouGov	GB	1,650	37%	32%	—N/a	28%	3%	5%
28–29 May	Opinium	GB	2,012	36%	33%	17%	14%	—N/a	3%
22–26 May	Survation	UK	1,040	48%	31%	—N/a	21%	—N/a	17%
21–22 May	Opinium	GB	2,008	39%	31%	14%	16%	—N/a	8%
18–19 May	YouGov	GB	1,718	39%	27%	—N/a	29%	5%	12%
13–14 May	Opinium	GB	2,005	42%	28%	15%	15%	—N/a	14%
5–7 May	Opinium	GB	2,005	44%	23%	16%	17%	—N/a	21%
27 Apr – 1 May	Opinium	GB	2,000	45%	23%	15%	16%	—N/a	22%
21–23 Apr	Opinium	GB	2,005	44%	23%	17%	16%	—N/a	21%
16–17 Apr	YouGov	GB	2,015	46%	22%	—N/a	28%	3%	24%
15–17 Apr	Opinium	GB	2,000	48%	22%	14%	16%	—N/a	26%

== Preferred prime minister and chancellor polling ==
Between 2020 and 2022, some pollsters asked voters which potential Prime Minister/Chancellor of the Exchequer pairing they would prefer. Each pollster uses the following wording for this question:

- Deltapoll: "Putting aside any support for a political party you may have, which of the following do you think would be best for the British economy?"
- Ipsos MORI: "do you think that a Labour Government with Keir Starmer as Prime Minister and Rachel Reeves as Chancellor of the Exchequer would do a better or worse job ... than the present government has done at managing the economy?"
- Opinium: "Which, if any, of the following would you say you trust more to handle the economy?"

=== Johnson and Sunak vs Starmer and Reeves ===
==== Graphical summary ====
View source data.
Graph of opinion polls conducted

==== Polls conducted ====
===== 2022 =====
Date(s) conducted	Pollster/client	Area Conducted	Sample size	Johnson & Sunak	Starmer & Reeves	Neither	Don't know	Lead
23 Mar	Opinium	UK	1025	31%	32%	24%	13%	1%
9–15 Mar	Ipsos MORI	GB	1,000	27%	26%	—N/a	13%	1%
30 Jan	Deltapoll	GB	TBC	36%	42%	—N/a	22%	6%

===== 2021 =====
Date(s) conducted	Pollster/client	Area Conducted	Sample size	Johnson & Sunak	Starmer & Reeves	Neither	Don't know	Lead
23–30 Dec	Deltapoll	GB	1,567	36%	35%	—N/a	29%	1%
2–3 Sep	Deltapoll	GB	1,589	46%	31%	—N/a	23%	15%
10–12 Jun	Deltapoll	GB	1,608	48%	31%	—N/a	21%	17%

=== Johnson and Sunak vs Starmer and Dodds ===
==== Graphical summary ====
View source data.
Graph of opinion polls conducted

==== Polls conducted ====
===== 2021 =====
Date(s) conducted	Pollster/client	Area Conducted	Sample size	Johnson & Sunak	Starmer & Dodds	Neither	Don't know	Lead
8–10 Apr	Deltapoll	GB	1,608	50%	30%	—N/a	20%	20%
25–27 Mar	Deltapoll	GB	1,610	47%	32%	—N/a	21%	15%
11–12 Mar	Opinium	GB	2,001	42%	25%	18%	15%	17%
24–26 Feb	Deltapoll	GB	1,527	48%	34%	—N/a	18%	14%
11–12 Feb	Opinium	GB	2,006	38%	25%	21%	17%	13%
21–23 Jan	Deltapoll	GB	1,632	44%	35%	—N/a	21%	9%

===== 2020 =====
Date(s) conducted	Pollster/client	Area Conducted	Sample size	Johnson & Sunak	Starmer & Dodds	Neither	Don't know	Lead
26–30 Dec	Deltapoll	GB	1,608	46%	32%	—N/a	22%	14%
26–28 Nov	Deltapoll	GB	1,525	46%	31%	—N/a	23%	15%
22–24 Oct	Deltapoll	GB	1,589	46%	34%	—N/a	20%	12%
24–25 Sep	Deltapoll	GB	1,583	45%	37%	—N/a	18%	8%
9–10 Jul	Opinium	GB	2,002	42%	26%	18%	14%	16%
2–3 Jul	Deltapoll	GB	1,549	48%	31%	—N/a	21%	17%
1–3 Jul	Opinium	GB	2,002	39%	27%	16%	17%	12%
27–28 May	Deltapoll	GB	1,557	49%	32%	—N/a	19%	17%
23–24 Apr	Deltapoll	GB	1,518	57%	23%	—N/a	20%	34%

== Hypothetical polling ==
Some pollsters conduct surveys to compare figures who are not both party leaders. These could include a comparison of leading politicians within the same party (to gauge support for future leadership contests), or compare the current leader of one party to an alternative leader of a second. The politicians listed below include:

- Boris Johnson, Prime Minister of the United Kingdom
- Keir Starmer, Leader of the Labour Party
- Rishi Sunak, Chancellor of the Exchequer
- Michael Gove, Minister for the Cabinet Office
- Andy Burnham, Mayor of Greater Manchester

=== Johnson vs Sunak ===
- Redfield & Wilton: "At this moment, which of the following individuals do you think would be the better Prime Minister for the United Kingdom?"
- Ipsos MORI: "Who do you think would make the most capable Prime Minister"
- J.L. Partners: "Of the following two politicians, who do you think would make the best Prime Minister?"
View source data.
Graph of opinion polls conducted

==== 2022 ====
Date(s) conducted	Pollster/client	Area	Sample size	Boris Johnson	Rishi Sunak	Unsure	Lead
27 Mar	Redfield & Wilton	GB	2,000	37%	28%	35%	9%
20 Mar	Redfield & Wilton	GB	2,000	35%	33%	32%	2%
21 Feb	Redfield & Wilton	GB	2,000	28%	40%	33%	–12%
31 Jan	Redfield & Wilton	GB	2,000	27%	45%	29%	–18%
17 Jan	Redfield & Wilton	GB	2,000	24%	42%	34%	–18%

==== 2021 ====
Date(s) conducted	Pollster/client	Area	Sample size	Boris Johnson	Rishi Sunak	Unsure	Lead
15 Nov	Redfield & Wilton	GB	2,000	35%	33%	31%	2%
13 Sep	Redfield & Wilton	GB	2,000	36%	30%	34%	6%
6 Sep	Redfield & Wilton	GB	2,000	35%	32%	33%	3%
29 Aug	Redfield & Wilton	GB	2,000	38%	28%	34%	10%
23 Aug	Redfield & Wilton	GB	2,000	35%	31%	33%	4%
16 Aug	Redfield & Wilton	GB	2,000	35%	34%	31%	1%
9 Aug	J.L. Partners	GB	1,019	24%	42%	33%	18%
9 Aug	Redfield & Wilton	GB	2,000	36%	34%	30%	2%
2 Aug	Redfield & Wilton	GB	2,000	37%	30%	34%	7%
25 Jul	Redfield & Wilton	GB	2,000	33%	34%	32%	1%
19 Jul	Redfield & Wilton	GB	2,000	37%	31%	32%	6%
12 Jul	Redfield & Wilton	GB	2,000	38%	32%	31%	6%
5 Jul	Redfield & Wilton	GB	2,000	37%	33%	30%	4%
28 Jun	Redfield & Wilton	GB	2,000	35%	35%	30%	0%
21 Jun	Redfield & Wilton	GB	2,000	40%	31%	30%	9%
13 Jun	Redfield & Wilton	GB	2,000	39%	31%	30%	8%
7 Jun	Redfield & Wilton	GB	2,000	43%	28%	30%	15%
31 May	Redfield & Wilton	GB	2,000	42%	29%	29%	13%
24 May	Redfield & Wilton	GB	2,000	42%	28%	30%	14%
17 May	Redfield & Wilton	GB	2,000	44%	27%	28%	17%
10 May	Redfield & Wilton	GB	2,000	44%	29%	27%	15%
3 May	Redfield & Wilton	GB	2,000	41%	31%	28%	10%
26 Apr	Redfield & Wilton	GB	2,000	40%	30%	30%	10%
19 Apr	Redfield & Wilton	GB	2,000	43%	29%	28%	14%
12 Apr	Redfield & Wilton	GB	2,000	43%	27%	30%	16%
5 Apr	Redfield & Wilton	GB	2,000	44%	29%	26%	15%
29 Mar	Redfield & Wilton	GB	2,000	42%	30%	28%	12%
22 Mar	Redfield & Wilton	GB	2,000	49%	27%	24%	22%
15 Mar	Redfield & Wilton	GB	2,000	44%	31%	25%	13%
5–12 Mar	Ipsos MORI	GB	1,009	41%	42%	17%	1%
8 Mar	Redfield & Wilton	GB	2,000	44%	27%	29%	17%
1 Mar	Redfield & Wilton	GB	1,500	42%	31%	27%	11%
22 Feb	Redfield & Wilton	GB	2,000	41%	28%	30%	13%
15 Feb	Redfield & Wilton	GB	2,000	38%	32%	29%	6%
8 Feb	Redfield & Wilton	GB	2,000	41%	30%	29%	11%
1 Feb	Redfield & Wilton	GB	2,000	39%	31%	30%	8%
25 Jan	Redfield & Wilton	GB	2,000	39%	31%	30%	8%
18 Jan	Redfield & Wilton	GB	2,000	39%	31%	30%	8%
11 Jan	Redfield & Wilton	GB	2,000	37%	32%	31%	5%

==== 2020 ====
Date(s) conducted	Pollster/client	Area	Sample size	Boris Johnson	Rishi Sunak	Unsure	Lead
2 Dec	Redfield & Wilton	GB	2,000	39%	31%	30%	8%
19 Nov	Redfield & Wilton	GB	2,500	33%	35%	32%	2%
11 Nov	Redfield & Wilton	GB	2,500	36%	34%	29%	2%
28 Oct	Redfield & Wilton	GB	3,000	33%	34%	33%	1%
21 Oct	Redfield & Wilton	GB	3,000	33%	36%	31%	3%
6–7 Oct	Redfield & Wilton	GB	3,000	35%	33%	32%	2%
30 Sep – 1 Oct	Redfield & Wilton	GB	4,000	34%	37%	29%	3%
22–23 Sep	Redfield & Wilton	GB	2,499	34%	37%	28%	3%
15–16 Sep	Redfield & Wilton	GB	2,500	35%	34%	31%	1%
1–2 Sep	Redfield & Wilton	GB	2,500	38%	33%	29%	5%
24 Aug	Redfield & Wilton	GB	2,000	36%	32%	32%	4%
19 Aug	Redfield & Wilton	GB	2,000	37%	33%	30%	4%
12 Aug	Redfield & Wilton	GB	2,000	39%	36%	25%	3%
29 Jul	Redfield & Wilton	GB	2,000	41%	33%	25%	8%
22 Jul	Redfield & Wilton	GB	2,000	38%	35%	27%	3%
15 Jul	Redfield & Wilton	GB	2,000	38%	38%	24%	0%
8 Jul	Redfield & Wilton	GB	2,000	38%	38%	24%	0%
1 Jul	Redfield & Wilton	GB	2,000	42%	33%	25%	9%
25 Jun	Redfield & Wilton	GB	2,000	44%	31%	25%	13%
18 Jun	Redfield & Wilton	GB	2,000	37%	30%	33%	7%

=== Johnson vs Burnham ===
Date(s) conducted	Pollster/client	Area	Sample size	Boris Johnson	Andy Burnham	Unsure	Lead
15 Nov 2021	Redfield & Wilton	GB	2,000	44%	29%	27%	15%
13 Sep 2021	Redfield & Wilton	GB	2,000	45%	27%	29%	18%
6 Sep 2021	Redfield & Wilton	GB	2,000	43%	28%	29%	15%
29 Aug 2021	Redfield & Wilton	GB	2,000	45%	25%	30%	20%
23 Aug 2021	Redfield & Wilton	GB	2,000	43%	27%	29%	16%
16 Aug 2021	Redfield & Wilton	GB	2,000	44%	25%	31%	19%
9 Aug 2021	Redfield & Wilton	GB	2,000	45%	28%	27%	17%
2 Aug 2021	Redfield & Wilton	GB	2,000	45%	23%	32%	22%
25 Jul 2021	Redfield & Wilton	GB	2,000	43%	29%	28%	14%
19 Jul 2021	Redfield & Wilton	GB	2,000	46%	27%	27%	19%

=== Starmer vs Burnham ===
Date(s) conducted	Pollster/client	Area	Sample size	Keir Starmer	Andy Burnham	Unsure	Lead
21 Oct 2020	Redfield & Wilton	GB	3,000	38%	17%	45%	21%

=== Gove vs Sunak ===
Date(s) conducted	Pollster/client	Area	Sample size	Michael Gove	Rishi Sunak	Unsure	Lead
15–16 Sep 2020	Redfield & Wilton	GB	2,500	11%	54%	35%	43%
1–2 Sep 2020	Redfield & Wilton	GB	2,500	11%	55%	34%	44%

== Topical polling ==
=== COVID-19 handling ===
The following polls asked people which leader they think would better handle the COVID-19 pandemic.

Date(s) conducted	Pollster/client	Area	Sample size	Boris Johnson	Keir Starmer	Unsure	Lead
11 Jun 2020	Redfield & Wilton	GB	1,500	42%	30%	28%	12%
27 May 2020	Redfield & Wilton	GB	1,500	44%	27%	29%	17%
15 May 2020	Redfield & Wilton	GB	1,500	49%	27%	24%	22%

== See also ==
- Opinion polling for the 2024 United Kingdom general election
- Potential re-accession of the United Kingdom to the European Union
