= 2027 Welsh local elections =

Upcoming elections in Wales

- 6 May 2027

All 1,234 seats to 22 Welsh councils
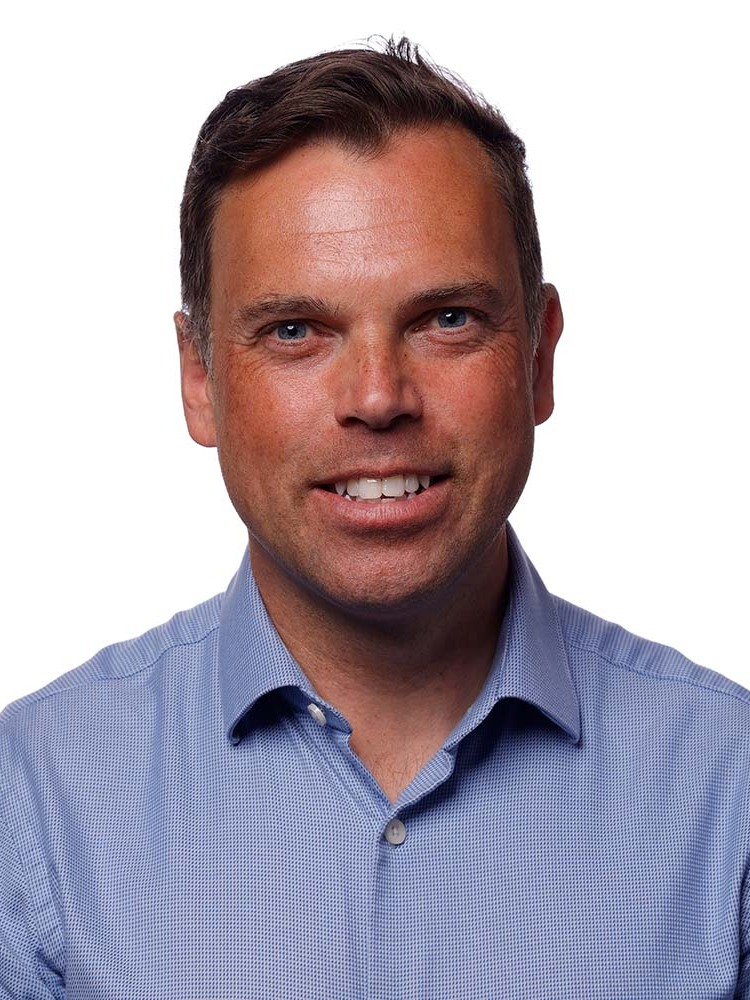

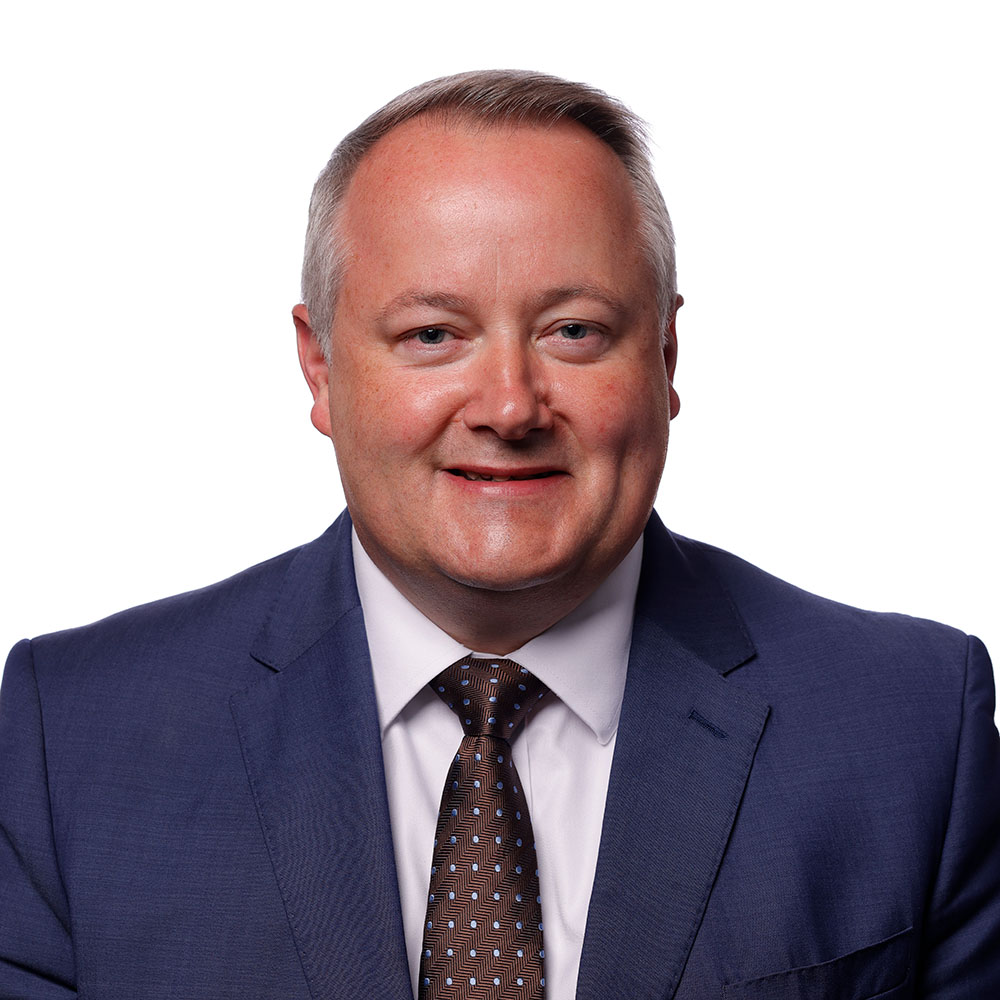

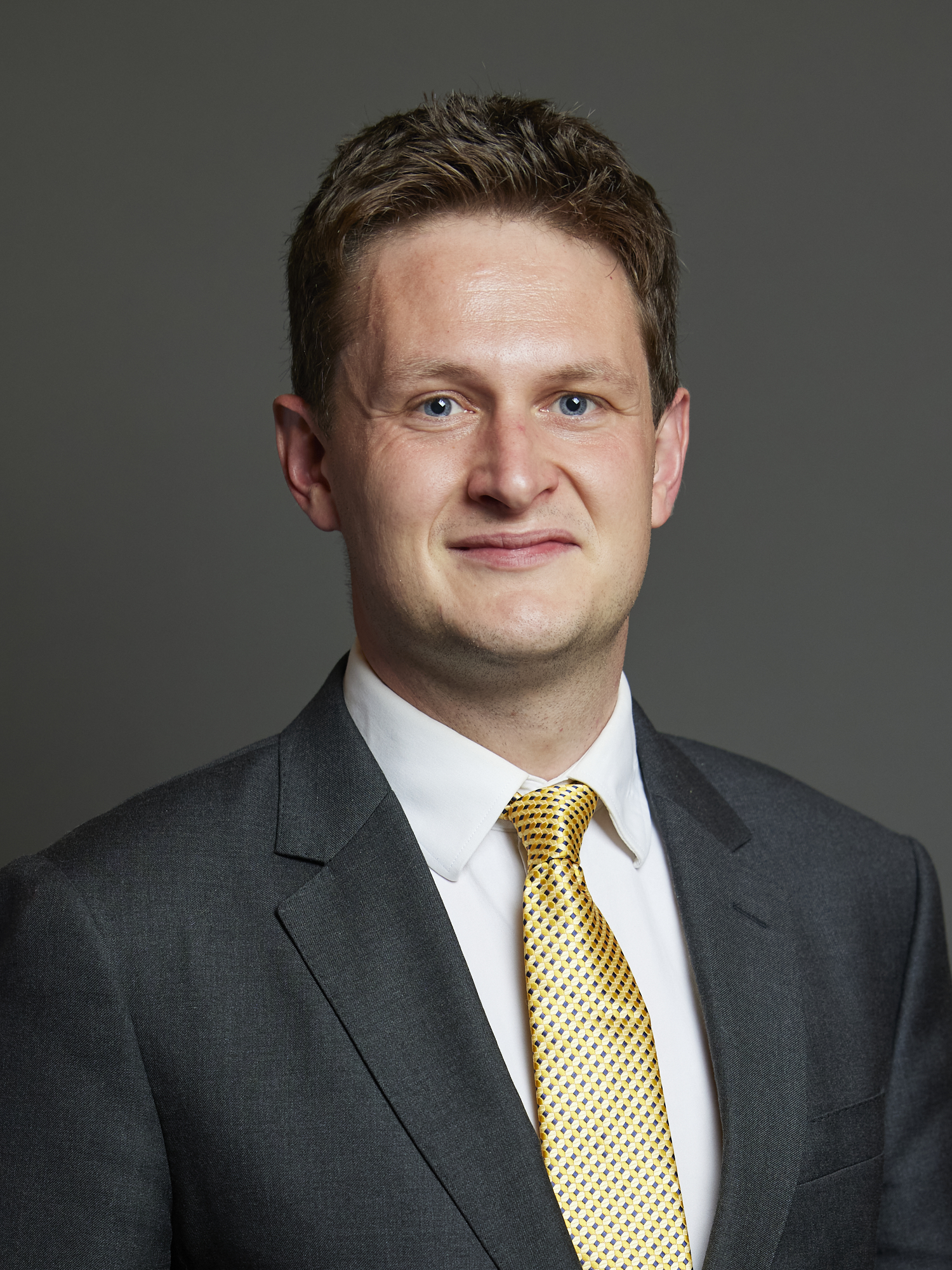

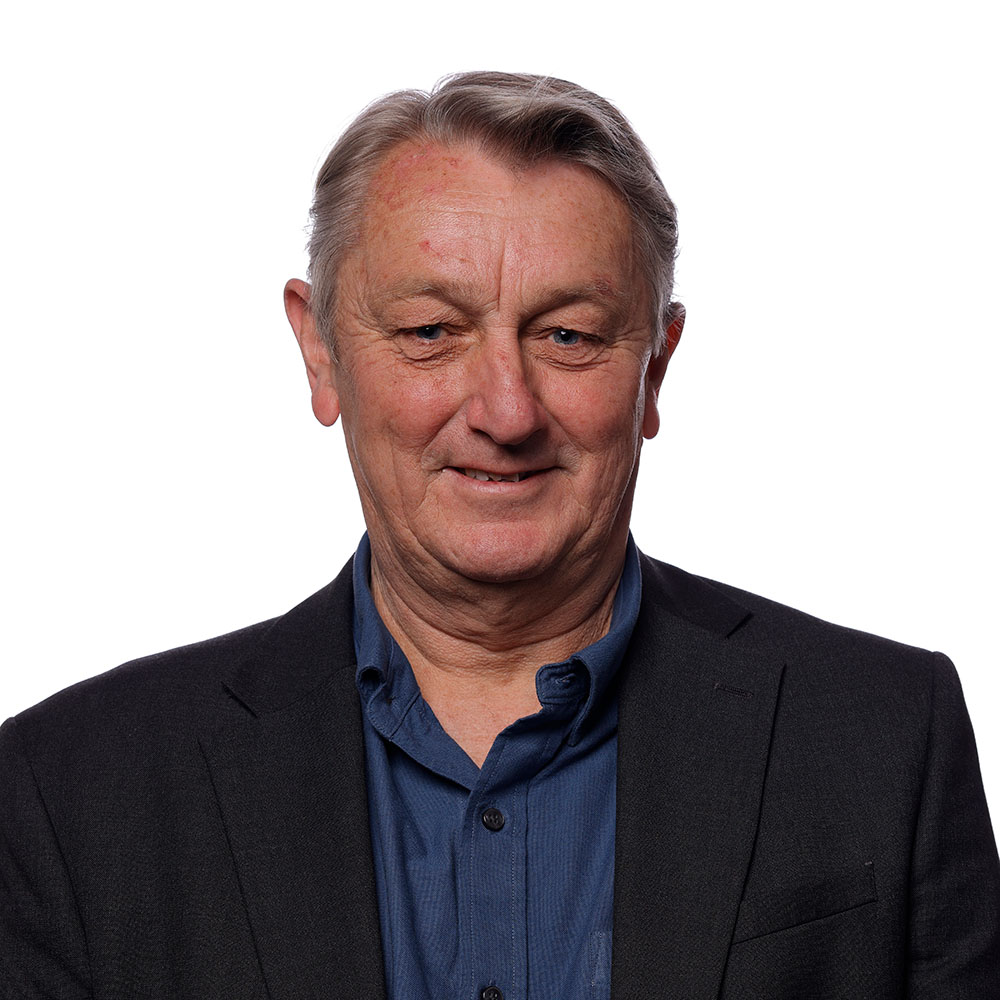

	Majority party	Minority party	Third party
Leader	Ken Skates	None	Rhun ap Iorwerth
Party	Labour	Independent	Plaid Cymru
Leader since	15 July 2026		16 June 2023
Last election	526 seats, 34.0% 8 councils	307 seats, 21.8% 0 councils	202 seats, 16.9% 4 councils
Seats before	476	342	195
	Fourth party	Fifth party	Sixth party
Leader	Darren Millar	David Chadwick	Anthony Slaughter
Party	Conservative	Liberal Democrats	Green
Leader since	5 December 2024	16 November 2026	21 December 2018
Last election	111 seats, 15.3% 0 councils	69 seats, 7.0% 0 councils	8 seats, 2.3% 0 councils
Seats before	103	69	14
	Seventh party
Leader	Helen Jenner
Party	Reform
Leader since	21 September 2026
Last election	Did not contest
Seats before	21

Local elections in Wales are to be held on 6 May 2027 to elect members to the twenty-two local authorities. They will take place alongside other local elections in England, Scotland and Northern Ireland, as well as an election to the Northern Ireland Assembly. The previous elections were held in 2022.

== Background ==
The 2022 Welsh local elections saw the Labour party increase its seat and vote share, while the Conservatives lost over a third of their seats. Plaid Cymru gained control of a further 4 councils, however lost 6 seats overall.

=== 2026 Senedd election ===
The 2026 Senedd election saw the Labour party lose a Senedd election for the first time since its establishment in 1999, falling to third place, with incumbent First Minister Eluned Morgan losing her seat. Rhun ap Iorwerth became the first First Minister not to come from the Labour Party, and the first Welsh nationalist to hold the post, running a minority government with Plaid Cymru.

== Electoral system ==
All eligible voters will be automatically registered to vote in this election.
The following requirements are in place to be eligible to vote:

- Aged 16 or over
- Be registered to vote
- Be registered at an address within the area you want to vote in
- Not be legally excluded from voting

Furthermore, people wishing to vote must also be one of the following:

- A British citizen
- An Irish or an EU citizen
- A qualifying commonwealth citizen
- A citizen of another country who has permission to live in the UK, or who does not require permission

All 1,234 council seats will be elected through the first-past-the-post system of voting if in single-member wards, or through plurality block voting if in multi-member wards.

Following the Local Government and Elections Act (Wales) 2021, all 22 Welsh councils will have the option to change to a different method of voting, although this law was not implemented quick enough for use in the 2022 local elections, and will not be used in the 2027 elections as the deadline to authorise the change has elapsed, with no local authority voting to change their electoral system.

== Councils ==
Bolding and shading denotes control of each council.

Council	Seats	Previous election	Current council control							Election details	Council control after election						
Council	Seats	Previous election	Lab	PC	Con	LD	Ref	Grn	Other	Election details	Lab	PC	Con	LD	Ref	Grn	Other
Blaenau Gwent	33	2022	19					1	13	Details							
Bridgend	51	2022	25	1	1				24	Details							
Caerphilly	69	2022	41	19				1	7	Details							
Cardiff	79	2022	50	2	9	10	1	1	6	Details							
Carmarthenshire	75	2022	14	38			1	1	20	Details							
Ceredigion	38	2022		21		7			10	Details							
Conwy	55	2022	6	8	8	4	2	1	26	Details							
Denbighshire	48	2022	14	7	8		1	2	16	Details							
Flintshire	67	2022	26		1	4	8		26	Details							
Gwynedd	69	2022		45		1			23	Details							
Isle of Anglesey	35	2022	3	18		1	1		12	Details							
Merthyr Tydfil	30	2022	15						15	Details							
Monmouthshire	46	2022	19		19			1	7	Details							
Neath Port Talbot	60	2022	22	11		3		1	23	Details							
Newport	51	2022	33		6	1		2	9	Details							
Pembrokeshire	60	2022	9	3	12	2	1		33	Details							
Powys	68	2022	9	4	13	23	3	1	15	Details							
Rhondda Cynon Taf	75	2022	57	8	2			1	7	Details							
Swansea	75	2022	44		5	14		1	11	Details							
Torfaen	40	2022	28				4		8	Details							
Vale of Glamorgan	54	2022	24	8	13				9	Details							
Wrexham	56	2022	14	7	7		1		27	Details							
All councils	1,234		472	200	104	70	23	14	347								

== Overall results ==
Party	2022 vote share	Votes	%	+/-	2022 councils	Councils	+/-	2022 seats	Seats	+/-
Labour	34.0%				8			526		
Independent	21.8%				0			307		
Plaid Cymru	16.87%				4			202		
Conservative	15.28%				0			111		
Liberal Democrats	6.97%				0			69		
Green	2.27%				0			8		
Other	2.84%				0			9		
No overall control	n/a	n/a	n/a	n/a	10	n/a	n/a	n/a	n/a	n/a
