= Sub-national opinion polling for the 2024 United Kingdom general election =

Sub-national opinion polling for the 2024 United Kingdom general election was carried out by various organisations to gauge voting intention by area. Most of the polling companies listed are members of the British Polling Council (BPC) and abide by its disclosure rules. The opinion polls listed range from the previous election on 12 December 2019 to the election on 4 July 2024.

== Northern Ireland ==
Date(s) conducted	Pollster	Client	Sample size	DUP	SF	All	SDLP	UUP	TUV	Others	Lead
4 Jul 2024	2024 general election		–	22.1%	27.0%	15.0%	11.1%	12.2%	6.2%	6.4%	4.9
24–25 Jun 2024	LucidTalk	Belfast Telegraph	3,859	21%	23%	18%	14%	13%	4%		2
8–10 Jun 2024	LucidTalk	Belfast Telegraph	3,634	21%	24%	17%	13%	12%	5%	8% 1% People Before Profit; 1% Greens; 1% Aontú; 5% Independents and Others	3
10–13 May 2024	LucidTalk	Belfast Telegraph	3,316	20%	26%	15%	10%	13%	8%	8% 2% Aontú; 1% People Before Profit; 1% Greens; 4% Independents and Others	6
28 Jan – 11 Feb 2024	Social Market Research	Irish News–University of Liverpool	1,206	23.5%	31.1%	15.2%	8.1%	11.1%	4.8%	–	6.6
26 Oct – 3 Nov 2023	Social Market Research	Institute of Irish Studies	1,074	25%	31%	15%	9%	11%	5%	5%	6
14 Jan – 7 Sep 2023	Northern Ireland Life and Times Survey (Note: The question asked was "If there were a general election tomorrow, which political party do you think you would be most likely to support?".)	ARK	1,200	19%	24%	28%	9%	13%	–	9% Greens on 5% Others on 4%	4
12 Dec 2019	2019 general election		–	30.6%	22.8%	16.8%	14.9%	11.7%	N/A	3.2%	7.8

== Scotland ==
Graph of opinion polls conducted in Scotland

Date(s) conducted	Pollster	Client	Sample size	SNP	Con	Lab	LD	Grn	Ref	Others	Lead
4 Jul 2024	2024 general election		–	30.0%	12.7%	35.3%	9.7%	3.8%	7.0%	1.6%	5.3
28 Jun – 2 Jul 2024	Savanta	The Scotsman	1,083	34%	15%	31%	9%	3%	6%	2%	3
24–28 Jun 2024	More in Common	N/A	1,008	30%	16%	35%	9%	2%	7%	1%	5
26–27 Jun 2024	Redfield & Wilton	N/A	1,200	32%	11%	38%	7%	3%	8%	1%	6
24–26 Jun 2024	Norstat	The Sunday Times	-	31%	13%	35%	8%	3%	8%	2%	4
21–25 Jun 2024	Savanta	The Scotsman	1,042	34%	14%	34%	7%	–	–	7%	Tie
21–25 Jun 2024	Survation	Ballot Box Scotland	1,022	31%	14%	37%	7%	3%	8%	1%	6
20–25 Jun 2024	YouGov	Sky News	1,059	29%	11%	35%	11%	5%	8%	1%	6
14–18 Jun 2024	Savanta	The Scotsman	1,069	33%	15%	38%	7%	–	–	7%	5
14–18 Jun 2024	YouGov	N/A	1,146	31%	11%	34%	7%	6%	11%	1%	3
11–14 Jun 2024	Norstat	The Sunday Times	1,050	30%	14%	34%	9%	4%	7%	2%	4
5–10 Jun 2024	Opinium	N/A	1,017	34%	14%	35%	8%	4%	5%	1%	1
3–9 Jun 2024	Ipsos	STV News	1,136	36%	13%	36%	5%	3%	4%	2% Alba on 1% Other on 1%	Tie
3–7 Jun 2024	YouGov	N/A	1,068	30%	13%	34%	8%	6%	7%	2%	4
1–2 Jun 2024	Redfield & Wilton	N/A	1,000	29%	17%	39%	8%	3%	4%	2% Alba on 1% Other on 1%	10
24–28 May 2024	Savanta	The Scotsman	1,067	33%	17%	37%	7%	–	–	5%	4
23–27 May 2024	Survation	True North	1,026	32%	17%	36%	9%	–	–	6%	4
22–25 May 2024	More in Common	N/A	1,016	30%	17%	35%	10%	3%	4%	1%	5
22 May	Rishi Sunak announces that a general election will be held on 4 July 2024										
13–17 May 2024	YouGov	N/A	1,114	29%	12%	39%	8%	7%	4%	2%	10
8–9 May 2024	Redfield & Wilton	N/A	1,078	31%	14%	38%	8%	4%	4%	1% Alba on 1% Other on 0%	7
6–8 May	John Swinney is elected Leader of the Scottish National Party and First Minister of Scotland										
3–8 May 2024	Savanta	The Scotsman	1,080	33%	17%	37%	7%	–	–	4%	4
30 Apr – 3 May 2024	Norstat	The Sunday Times	1,014	29%	16%	34%	8%	4%	6%	4% Alba on 3% Other on 1%	5
29 Apr 2024	Humza Yousaf announces his resignation as First Minister of Scotland.										
26–29 Apr 2024	YouGov	N/A	1,043	33%	14%	34%	8%	4%	5%	2%	1
9–12 Apr 2024	Norstat	The Sunday Times	1,086	32%	16%	32%	9%	4%	5%	3% Alba on 2% Other on 1%	Tie
6–7 Apr 2024	Redfield & Wilton	N/A	1,000	32%	17%	33%	8%	2%	5%	2% Alba on 2% Other on 0%	1
25 Mar – 2 Apr 2024	YouGov	N/A	1,100	31%	14%	33%	7%	5%	7%	1%	2
10–11 Mar 2024	Redfield & Wilton	N/A	1,000	34%	16%	34%	6%	4%	4%	1% Alba on 1% Other on 0%	Tie
14–20 Feb 2024	Survation	Quantum Communications	1,043	38%	15%	33%	8%	–	–	7%	5
3–4 Feb 2024	Redfield & Wilton	N/A	1,000	33%	18%	34%	8%	2%	4%	1% Alba on 1% Other on 0%	1
25–31 Jan 2024	Ipsos	STV News	1,005	39%	14%	32%	6%	4%	–	5%	7
23–25 Jan 2024	Survation	True North	1,029	36%	16%	34%	8%	–	–	7%	2
22–25 Jan 2024	Norstat	The Sunday Times	1,007	33%	16%	36%	7%	–	–	8%	3
9–11 Jan 2024	Redfield & Wilton	N/A	1,040	35%	17%	35%	9%	2%	2%	1%	Tie
26–27 Nov 2023	Redfield & Wilton	N/A	1,054	34%	17%	36%	6%	3%	3%	0%	2
20–26 Nov 2023	Ipsos	N/A	990	40%	15%	30%	6%	3%	–	5%	10
29–30 Oct 2023	Redfield & Wilton	N/A	1,092	32%	23%	32%	8%	2%	2%	1%	Tie
20–25 Oct 2023	YouGov	Scottish Elections Study	1,200	32%	16%	38%	6%	4%	–	4%	6
6–11 Oct 2023	Savanta	The Scotsman	1,018	35%	19%	35%	6%	–	–	4%	Tie
2–6 Oct 2023	YouGov	N/A	1,028	33%	20%	32%	5%	5%	2%	2%	1
5 Oct 2023	Rutherglen and Hamilton West by-election										
4–5 Oct 2023	Redfield & Wilton	N/A	1,095	34%	21%	32%	9%	2%	–	2%	4
5–14 Sep 2023	Opinium	Tony Blair Institute	1,004	37%	18%	28%	8%	4%	–	4%	9
8–13 Sep 2023	YouGov	The Times	1,103	38%	16%	27%	7%	6%	4%	2%	11
2–4 Sep 2023	Redfield & Wilton	N/A	1,100	35%	15%	35%	8%	4%	–	3%	Tie
15–18 Aug 2023	Survation	True North	1,022	37%	17%	35%	6%	–	–	5%	2
3–8 Aug 2023	YouGov	The Times	1,086	36%	15%	32%	6%	6%	3%	2%	4
5–6 Aug 2023	Redfield & Wilton	N/A	1,050	37%	17%	34%	7%	2%	–	3%	3
1–2 Jul 2023	Redfield & Wilton	N/A	1,030	35%	21%	32%	7%	2%	–	3%	3
23–28 Jun 2023	Survation	–	2,026	37%	17%	34%	9%	–	–	4%	3
12–15 Jun 2023	Panelbase	The Sunday Times	1,007	34%	18%	34%	7%	–	–	7%	Tie
9–14 Jun 2023	Savanta	The Scotsman	1,018	38%	17%	34%	7%	–	–	4%	4
9–13 Jun 2023	YouGov	Scottish Elections Study	1,200	33%	17%	36%	7%	4%	–	3%	3
3–5 Jun 2023	Redfield & Wilton	N/A	1,466	37%	20%	28%	9%	3%	–	3%	9
15–21 May 2023	Ipsos MORI	STV News	1,090	41%	16%	29%	6%	3%	–	4%	12
27 Apr – 3 May 2023	Survation	True North	1,009	38%	18%	31%	9%	2%	–	4%	7
30 Apr – 2 May 2023	Redfield & Wilton	N/A	1,295	35%	18%	32%	9%	3%	–	3%	3
17–20 Apr 2023	YouGov	The Times	1,032	37%	17%	28%	8%	5%	2%	2%	9
29 Mar – 3 Apr 2023	Survation	N/A	1,001	40%	17%	32%	7%	1%	–	3%	8
31 Mar – 1 Apr 2023	Redfield & Wilton	N/A	1,000	36%	19%	31%	10%	2%	–	3%	5
28–31 Mar 2023	Savanta	The Scotsman	1,009	39%	19%	33%	6%	–	–	4%	6
28–30 Mar 2023	Panelbase	The Sunday Times	1,089	39%	19%	31%	5%	–	–	6%	8
27 Mar 2023	Humza Yousaf is elected leader of the Scottish National Party										
9–13 Mar 2023	YouGov	Sky News	1,002	39%	16%	29%	6%	6%	3%	1%	10
8–10 Mar 2023	Survation	Diffley Partnership	1,037	40%	18%	32%	6%	2%	–	3%	8
7–10 Mar 2023	Panelbase	Scot Goes Pop	1,013	40%	16%	33%	6%	–	–	5%	7
2–5 Mar 2023	Redfield & Wilton	N/A	1,050	39%	22%	29%	6%	2%	–	3%	10
17–20 Feb 2023	YouGov	The Times	1,017	38%	19%	29%	6%	4%	2%	2%	9
15–17 Feb 2023	Survation	N/A	1,034	43%	17%	30%	6%	–	–	3%	13
15–17 Feb 2023	Savanta	The Scotsman	1,004	42%	17%	32%	6%	–	–	3%	10
10–15 Feb 2023	YouGov	Scottish Election Study	1,239	38%	16%	35%	6%	3%	–	3%	3
1–7 Feb 2023	Survation	N/A	TBA	42%	18%	29%	6%	–	–	0%	13
23–26 Jan 2023	YouGov	The Sunday Times	1,088	42%	15%	29%	6%	3%	3%	2%	13
10–12 Jan 2023	Survation	True North	1,002	43%	18%	29%	7%	–	–	2%	14
22 Dec – 1 Jan 2023	Survation	Scotland in Union	1,025	44%	16%	31%	6%	–	–	1%	13
16–21 Dec 2022	Savanta	The Scotsman	1,048	43%	19%	30%	6%	–	–	2%	13
6–9 Dec 2022	YouGov	The Times	1,090	43%	14%	29%	6%	4%	3%	1%	14
28 Nov – 5 Dec 2022	Ipsos MORI	STV News	1,045	51%	13%	25%	6%	3%	–	0%	26
26–27 Nov 2022	Redfield & Wilton	N/A	1,000	41%	16%	31%	8%	2%	–	3%	10
7–11 Oct 2022	Panelbase	Alba Party	1,000+	42%	16%	30%	6%	2%	–	2%	12
5–7 Oct 2022	Panelbase	The Sunday Times	1,017	45%	15%	30%	5%	–	–	4%	15
30 Sep – 4 Oct 2022	YouGov	The Times	1,067	45%	12%	31%	7%	3%	1%	1%	14
30 Sep – 4 Oct 2022	ComRes	The Scotsman	1,029	46%	15%	30%	8%	–	–	1%	16
28–29 Sep 2022	Survation	Scotland in Union	1,011	44%	15%	31%	6%	–	–	4%	13
17–19 Aug 2022	Panelbase	The Sunday Times	1,133	44%	20%	23%	8%	–	–	5%	21
29 Jun – 1 Jul 2022	Panelbase	The Sunday Times	1,010	47%	19%	23%	8%	–	–	3%	24
23–28 Jun 2022	Savanta ComRes	The Scotsman	1,029	46%	18%	25%	8%	–	–	3%	21
23–29 May 2022	Ipsos	STV News	1,000	44%	19%	23%	10%	3%	–	2%	21
18–23 May 2022	YouGov	The Times	1,115	46%	19%	22%	6%	3%	1%	2%	24
5 May 2022	Local elections held in Scotland										
26–29 Apr 2022	Panelbase	The Sunday Times	1,009	42%	21%	24%	7%	–	–	5%	18
25–31 Mar 2022	BMG	The Herald	1,012	42%	19%	26%	6%	4%	–	2%	16
24–28 Mar 2022	Survation	Ballot Box Scotland	1,002	45%	19%	27%	6%	–	–	2%	18
1–4 Feb 2022	Panelbase	The Sunday Times	1,128	44%	20%	24%	8%	2%	–	2%	20
15–22 Dec 2021	Opinium	Daily Record	1,328	48%	17%	22%	7%	3%	–	4%	26
18–22 Nov 2021	YouGov	The Times	1,060	48%	20%	18%	6%	3%	2%	2%	28
9–12 Nov 2021	Panelbase	The Sunday Times	1,000~	48%	21%	20%	7%	–	–	4%	27
20–26 Oct 2021	Panelbase	Scot Goes Pop	1,001	48%	21%	21%	7%	–	–	4%	27
6–10 Sep 2021	Panelbase	The Sunday Times	2,003	47%	23%	19%	7%	–	–	4%	24
2–8 Sep 2021	Opinium	Sky News	1,014	51%	21%	17%	5%	2%	–	3%	30
20 Aug 2021	Alex Cole-Hamilton becomes leader of the Scottish Liberal Democrats										
16–24 Jun 2021	Panelbase	The Sunday Times	1,287	47%	25%	18%	6%	–	–	4%	22
13 May 2021	Airdrie and Shotts by-election										
6 May 2021	Election to the Scottish Parliament										
2–4 May 2021	YouGov	The Times	1,144	48%	22%	19%	5%	4%	1%	2%	26
30 Apr – 4 May 2021	Survation	DC Thomson	1,008	48%	22%	20%	7%	1%	–	1%	26
28 Apr – 3 May 2021	Opinium	Sky News	1,015	47%	25%	20%	6%	1%	–	1%	22
27–30 Apr 2021	BMG	The Herald	1,023	48%	20%	20%	7%	3%	–	1%	28
23–26 Apr 2021	Survation	Good Morning Britain	1,008	46%	22%	22%	8%	–	–	2%	24
21–26 Apr 2021	Panelbase	Scot Goes Pop	1,075	45%	22%	19%	7%	4%	–	3%	23
20–22 Apr 2021	Survation	DC Thomson	1,037	47%	21%	22%	8%	1%	–	1%	25
16–20 Apr 2021	YouGov	The Times	1,204	48%	24%	19%	4%	3%	1%	2%	24
1–6 Apr 2021	Opinium	Sky News	1,023	50%	24%	19%	4%	1%	–	1%	26
29–30 Mar 2021	Survation	The Courier	1,021	49%	21%	21%	8%	1%	–	0%	28
19–22 Mar 2021	YouGov	The Times	TBA	49%	24%	17%	4%	4%	1%	1%	25
16–19 Mar 2021	BMG	The Herald	1,021	47%	21%	19%	7%	3%	–	3%	26
11–18 Mar 2021	Survation	The Courier	1,452	49%	21%	21%	7%	1%	–	1%	28
11–16 Mar 2021	Opinium	Sky News	1,096	50%	23%	19%	5%	3%	–	1%	27
4–8 Mar 2021	YouGov	The Times	1,100	50%	23%	17%	5%	3%	1%	1%	27
27 Feb 2021	Anas Sarwar is elected leader of Scottish Labour										
25–26 Feb 2021	Survation	Daily Record	1,011	48%	23%	21%	6%	–	–	2%	25
11–13 Jan 2021	Survation	Scot Goes Pop	1,020	48%	19%	23%	7%	–	–	3%	25
4–9 Dec 2020	Survation	N/A	1,009	51%	20%	21%	6%	3%	–	–	30
5–11 Nov 2020	Panelbase	Scot Goes Pop	1,020	50%	21%	20%	5%	2%	–	–	29
6–10 Nov 2020	YouGov	The Times	1,089	53%	19%	17%	4%	3%	3%	1%	34
28 Oct – 4 Nov 2020	Survation	N/A	1,059	52%	18%	20%	8%	–	–	2%	32
17–21 Sep 2020	JL Partners	Politico	1,016	56%	18%	15%	7%	3%	–	0%	38
2–7 Sep 2020	Survation	N/A	1,018	51%	20%	21%	6%	–	–	3%	30
6–10 Aug 2020	YouGov	The Times	1,142	54%	20%	16%	5%	2%	2%	0%	34
5 Aug 2020	Douglas Ross becomes leader of the Scottish Conservatives										
30 Jun – 3 Jul 2020	Panelbase	The Sunday Times	1,026	53%	21%	19%	6%	–	–	2%	32
1–5 Jun 2020	Panelbase	Scot Goes Pop	1,022	51%	21%	19%	6%	2%	–	1%	30
1–5 May 2020	Panelbase	Wings Over Scotland	1,086	50%	26%	17%	5%	2%	–	1%	24
24–27 Apr 2020	YouGov	N/A	1,095	51%	25%	15%	6%	2%	0%	1%	26
24–26 Mar 2020	Panelbase	The Sunday Times	1,023	48%	27%	16%	5%	3%	–	–	21
14 Feb 2020	Jackson Carlaw becomes leader of the Scottish Conservatives										
12 Dec 2019	2019 general election		–	45.0%	25.1%	18.6%	9.5%	1.0%	0.5%	0.3%	19.9

== Wales ==
Graph of opinion polls conducted in Wales

Dates conducted	Pollster	Client	Sample size	Lab	Con	PC	LD	Ref	Grn	Others	Lead
4 Jul 2024	2024 general election		–	37.0%	18.2%	14.8%	6.5%	16.9%	4.7%	1.9%	18.8
27 Jun – 1 Jul 2024	YouGov	Barn Cymru	1,072	40%	16%	14%	7%	16%	5%	2%	24
24–28 Jun 2024	More in Common	N/A	848	42%	22%	9%	4%	14%	5%	4%	20
19–20 Jun 2024	Redfield & Wilton	N/A	930	46%	15%	10%	7%	17%	4%	1%	29
14–18 Jun 2024	Savanta	N/A	1,026	49%	19%	12%	5%	12%	3%	-	30
5–7 Jun 2024	Redfield & Wilton	N/A	960	45%	18%	11%	5%	18%	4%	0%	27
30 May – 3 Jun 2024	YouGov	Barn Cymru	1,066	45%	18%	12%	5%	13%	4%	1%	27
22–27 May 2024	More in Common	N/A	805	45%	21%	13%	4%	12%	3%	1%	24
22 May 2024	Rishi Sunak announces that a general election will be held on 4 July 2024										
18–19 May 2024	Redfield & Wilton	N/A	900	43%	19%	14%	3%	15%	6%	1%	24
22–23 Apr 2024	Redfield & Wilton	N/A	840	40%	18%	14%	6%	18%	4%	0%	22
23–24 Mar 2024	Redfield & Wilton	N/A	878	49%	16%	10%	5%	15%	5%	1%	33
20 Mar 2024	Vaughan Gething becomes First Minister of Wales										
18 Feb 2024	Redfield & Wilton	N/A	874	45%	22%	10%	5%	13%	5%	1%	23
24–26 Jan 2024	Redfield & Wilton	N/A	1,100	48%	20%	10%	4%	12%	4%	1%	28
10–11 Dec 2023	Redfield & Wilton	N/A	1,086	47%	22%	11%	6%	10%	2%	0%	25
4–7 Dec 2023	YouGov	Barn Cymru	1,004	42%	20%	15%	7%	12%	3%	1%	22
12–13 Nov 2023	Redfield & Wilton	N/A	1,100	44%	24%	13%	4%	9%	5%	1%	20
14–15 Oct 2023	Redfield & Wilton	N/A	959	46%	26%	10%	3%	10%	4%	0%	20
16–17 Sep 2023	Redfield & Wilton	N/A	1,172	44%	22%	10%	9%	7%	6%	1%	22
1–6 Sep 2023	YouGov	Barn Cymru	1,051	50%	19%	12%	5%	8%	5%	2%	31
13–14 Aug 2023	Redfield & Wilton	N/A	1,068	41%	24%	13%	7%	11%	4%	0%	17
14–16 Jul 2023	Redfield & Wilton	N/A	1,050	46%	24%	10%	7%	10%	3%	1%	22
17–18 Jun 2023	Redfield & Wilton	N/A	1,000	43%	22%	10%	7%	12%	4%	1%	21
16 Jun 2023	Rhun ap Iorwerth becomes leader of Plaid Cymru										
12–17 May 2023	YouGov	Barn Cymru	1,064	49%	19%	10%	8%	9%	4%	1%	30
14–15 May 2023	Redfield & Wilton	N/A	1,058	43%	23%	11%	8%	9%	4%	1%	20
15–17 Apr 2023	Redfield & Wilton	N/A	1,251	44%	24%	12%	7%	9%	4%	0%	20
17–23 Feb 2023	YouGov	WalesOnline	1,083	53%	19%	12%	4%	8%	3%	1%	34
3–7 Feb 2023	YouGov	Barn Cymru	1,081	49%	20%	14%	5%	9%	3%	1%	29
25 Nov – 1 Dec 2022	YouGov	Barn Cymru	1,042	51%	18%	13%	4%	8%	4%	2%	33
30 Sep – 4 Oct 2022	Survation	38 Degrees	6,012	51%	24%	13%	6%	–	–	6%	27
20–22 Sep 2022	YouGov	Barn Cymru	1,014	46%	23%	15%	5%	5%	3%	3%	23
12–16 Jun 2022	YouGov	Barn Cymru	1,020	41%	26%	16%	7%	4%	4%	2%	15
5 May 2022	Local elections held in Wales										
25 Feb – 1 Mar 2022	YouGov	Barn Cymru	1,086	41%	26%	13%	7%	6%	4%	3%	15
13–16 Dec 2021	YouGov	Barn Cymru	1,009	41%	26%	13%	3%	7%	6%	3%	15
27 Sep – 1 Oct 2021	YouGov	?	?	39%	29%	17%	3%	5%	–	7%	10
13–16 Sep 2021	YouGov	ITV Cymru Wales/Cardiff University	1,071	37%	31%	15%	4%	6%	5%	2%	6
6 May 2021	Election to the Senedd										
2–4 May 2021	YouGov	ITV Cymru Wales/Cardiff University	1,071	37%	36%	14%	3%	4%	3%	3%	1
18–21 Apr 2021	YouGov	ITV Cymru Wales/Cardiff University	1,142	37%	33%	18%	2%	3%	4%	3%	4
9–19 Apr 2021	Opinium	Sky News	2,005	42%	33%	14%	3%	–	3%	5% UKIP on 3% Other on 2%	9
16–19 Mar 2021	YouGov	ITV Cymru Wales/Cardiff University	1,174	35%	35%	17%	4%	2%	3%	3%	Tie
24 Jan 2021	Andrew RT Davies becomes leader of the Welsh Conservatives										
11–14 Jan 2021	YouGov	ITV Cymru Wales/Cardiff University	1,018	36%	33%	17%	3%	5%	4%	2%	3
26–30 Oct 2020	YouGov	ITV Cymru Wales/Cardiff University	1,013	43%	32%	13%	3%	5%	3%	2%	11
28 Aug – 4 Sep 2020	YouGov	ITV Cymru Wales/Cardiff University	1,110	41%	33%	15%	2%	4%	3%	2%	8
29 May – 1 Jun 2020	YouGov	ITV Cymru Wales/Cardiff University	1,021	39%	35%	15%	5%	2%	3%	1%	4
3–7 Apr 2020	YouGov	ITV Cymru Wales/Cardiff University	1,008	34%	46%	11%	4%	3%	2%	0%	12
20–26 Jan 2020	YouGov	ITV Cymru Wales/Cardiff University	1,037	36%	41%	13%	5%	3%	2%	1%	5
12 Dec 2019	2019 general election		–	40.9%	36.1%	9.9%	6.0%	5.4%	1.0%	0.7%	4.8

== English mayoral regions ==
Most of the following polling are the results of secondary questions on Westminster voting intention from polls primarily for the May 2024 United Kingdom mayoralty elections.

=== London ===
Graph of opinion polls conducted in London

Date(s) conducted	Pollster	Client	Sample size	Lab	Con	LD	Grn	Ref	Others	Lead
4 Jul 2024	2024 general election		–	43.1%	20.4%	11.1%	8.7%	10.1%	6.6%	22.7
21–26 Jun 2024	Savanta	Centre for London	1,579	49%	19%	10%	6%	11%	5%	30
10–18 Jun 2024	Savanta	Mile End Institute	1,022	55%	22%	10%	5%	8%	1%	33
2 May 2024	Elections to the Mayoralty and London Assembly									
26–30 Apr 2024	Savanta	Centre for London	1,532	53%	23%	13%	4%	8%	0%	30
24–30 Apr 2024	YouGov	N/A	1,192	54%	17%	9%	9%	9%	2%	37
9–17 Apr 2024	YouGov	N/A	1,157	55%	16%	8%	9%	9%	3%	39
8–17 Apr 2024	Savanta	Mile End Institute	1,034	52%	27%	10%	4%	6%	1%	25
6–8 Apr 2024	Redfield & Wilton	N/A	1,000	51%	23%	13%	7%	5%	0%	28
21–26 Mar 2024	Survation	ITV	1,019	52%	21%	11%	6%	9%	1%	31
12–19 Feb 2024	YouGov	QMUL	1,113	52%	17%	10%	10%	10%	1%	35
31 Oct – 8 Nov 2023	Lord Ashcroft	Evening Standard	2,750	51%	23%	13%	6%	6%	1%	28
12–17 Oct 2023	YouGov	QMUL	1,066	55%	20%	9%	9%	4%	2%	35
4–6 Sep 2023	Redfield & Wilton	N/A	1,100	47%	27%	17%	4%	4%	1%	20
20 Jul 2023	By-election in Uxbridge and South Ruislip									
30 Jun – 5 Jul 2023	Survation	N/A	1,050	53%	23%	14%	4%	3%	2% Reclaim Party on 1% UKIP on 0% Other on 1%	30
27–31 Mar 2023	YouGov	N/A	1,051	58%	18%	9%	7%	6%	1%	40
30 Sep – 4 Oct 2022	Survation	38 Degrees	6,012	59%	22%	13%	–	–	6%	37
5 May 2022	Local elections in London									
28 Feb – 3 Mar 2022	YouGov	Queen Mary University of London	1,114	56%	24%	8%	8%	2%	1%	32
13–17 Jan 2022	YouGov	N/A	1,166	55%	23%	9%	7%	3%	3%	32
7–10 Jan 2022	YouGov	N/A	1,115	51%	23%	11%	9%	4%	2%	28
2 Dec 2021	Old Bexley and Sidcup by-election									
6 May 2021	Elections to the Mayoralty and London Assembly									
4–5 May 2021	Panelbase	N/A	1,002	47%	32%	12%	6%	–	4%	15
2–4 May 2021	YouGov	N/A	1,141	51%	33%	7%	7%	1%	1%	18
28 Apr – 3 May 2021	Opinium	N/A	1,005	47%	32%	11%	6%	0%	4% UKIP on 2% Other on 2%	15
7–10 Apr 2021	Opinium	N/A	1,093	49%	33%	9%	6%	0%	4% UKIP on 2% Other on 2%	16
29 Mar – 1 Apr 2021	YouGov	Queen Mary University of London	1,192	50%	31%	8%	7%	2%	2%	19
17–20 Mar 2021	Opinium	N/A	1,100	49%	34%	9%	6%	0%	3% UKIP on 2% Other on 1%	15
13–14 Jan 2021	Redfield & Wilton	N/A	1,500	48%	27%	14%	8%	2%	3%	21
16–19 Nov 2020	YouGov	Queen Mary University of London	1,192	55%	30%	7%	5%	3%	1%	25
15–17 Oct 2020	Redfield & Wilton	N/A	2,000	53%	26%	12%	6%	–	3%	27
7–8 Sep 2020	Redfield & Wilton	N/A	2,000	50%	29%	12%	6%	–	3%	21
5–7 Aug 2020	Redfield & Wilton	N/A	2,500	48%	29%	14%	7%	–	2%	19
2–6 Mar 2020	YouGov	Queen Mary University of London	1,002	46%	34%	11%	7%	1%	1%	12
12 Dec 2019	2019 general election		–	48.1%	32.0%	14.9%	3.1%	1.4%	0.5%	16.1

=== Tees Valley ===
The following polls related to the Tees Valley Combined Authority area, which comprises the seven constituencies of Darlington, Hartlepool, Middlesbrough and Thornaby East, Middlesbrough South and East Cleveland, Redcar, Stockton North, and Stockton West.

Dates conducted	Pollster	Client	Sample size	Con	Lab	Ref	LD	Grn	Other	Lead
4 Jul 2024	2024 general election		–	31.1%	42.5%	16.7%	3.4%	4.1%	2.2%	11.5
2 May 2024	2024 Tees Valley mayoral election									
17–19 Apr 2024	Redfield and Wilton	N/A	900	26%	49%	15%	6%	4%	0%	23
12 Dec 2019	2019 general election		–	43.9%	40.2%	7.8%	4.2%	1.2%	2.7%	3.7

=== West Midlands county ===
The following polls relate to the West Midlands metropolitan county, as opposed to the statistical region.

Dates conducted	Pollster	Client	Sample size	Con	Lab	LD	Ref	Grn	Other	Lead
4 Jul 2024	2024 general election		–	22.6%	38.8%	5.3%	17.3%	6.5%	9.6%	16.2
2 May 2024	2024 West Midlands mayoral election									
11–17 Apr 2024	Savanta	The News Agents	1,018	23%	54%	9%	9%	5%	1%	31
10–14 Apr 2024	Redfield and Wilton	N/A	1,000	24%	52%	7%	12%	5%	1%	28
12 Dec 2019	2019 general election		–	44.4%	44.1%	6.1%	2.5%	2.3%	0.6%	0.2

== Individual constituency poll results ==
=== Bicester and Woodstock ===
Bicester and Woodstock was a new seat at the 2024 general election.

Dates conducted	Pollster	Client	Sample size	Con	LD	Lab	Grn	Ref	Lead
4 Jul 2024	2024 general election		–	28.8%	38.7%	16.4%	4.8%	10.8%	9.9
6 Jun – 24 Jun 2024	WeThink	The Economist	458	30%	31%	31%	3%	3%	Tie
12 Dec 2019	2019 general election (Note: Notional result)		–	53.9%	26.6%	16.9%	2.4%	0.3%	27.3

=== Bristol Central ===
Bristol Central was a new seat at the 2024 general election. The Green Party candidate was one of its co-leaders, Carla Denyer. The Labour Party candidate was the Shadow Secretary of State for Culture, Media and Sport, Thangam Debbonaire.

Dates conducted	Pollster	Client	Sample size	Lab	Grn	Con	Ref	LD	Others	Lead
4 Jul 2024	2024 general election		–	32.6%	56.6%	4.6%	3.1%	2.7%	0.5%	20.0
25 Jun – 1 Jul 2024	We Think	The Green Party	400	40%	49%	6%	3%	3%	0%	9
12 Dec 2019	2019 general election		–	58.5%	26.0%	14.3%	1.2%	–	0.2%	32.5

=== Caerfyrddin (Carmarthen) ===
Caerfyrddin (Carmarthen) was a new seat at the 2024 general election, replacing Carmarthen East and Dinefwr and Carmarthen West and South Pembrokeshire.

Dates conducted	Pollster	Client	Sample size	Con	PC	Lab	Ref	LD	Edwards (Note: Jonathan Edwards was the incumbent MP for Carmarthen East and Dinefwr, elected as a Plaid MP. He was suspended from the party after being arrested for domestic assault. He did not run in the 2024 election.) (Ind)	Others	Lead
4 Jul 2024	2024 general election		–	19.4%	34.0%	24.1%	15.2%	3.2%	–	4.1%	9.9
2 Jan – 4 Feb 2024	Survation	Plaid Cymru	520	24%	30%	24%	4%	4%	10%	3%	6
12 Dec 2019	2019 general election		–	39.2%	30.7%	25.1%	3.8%	1.3%	–	–	8.5

=== Chingford and Woodford Green ===
Between the 2019 and 2024 general elections the boundaries of Chingford and Woodford Green were changed. The Conservative Party's candidate was former party leader Iain Duncan Smith. Faiza Shaheen was the Labour Party candidate for the seat in 2019 and originally reselected to contest the seat again. However, she was deselected by Labour's NEC and replaced. The below poll was conducted before Shaheen left the Labour Party and announced her candidacy as an independent.

Dates conducted	Pollster	Client	Sample size	Con	Lab	Shaheen (Ind) (Note: Shaheen was the Labour Party candidate in 2019.)	LD	Grn	Ref	Others	Lead
4 Jul 2024	2024 general election		–	35.6%	25.8%	25.7%	2.6%	2.7%	7.5%	–	9.8
31 Aug – 21 Sep 2021	Opinium (Note: Poll conducted based on the previous boundaries for this constituency, not the boundaries used at the general election)	Greenpeace	525	42%	39%	–	6%	8%	–	5%	3
12 Dec 2019	2019 general election		–	48.2%	45.3%		5.8%	0.4%	0.3%	–	2.9

=== Clacton ===
Between the 2019 and 2024 general elections the boundaries of Clacton were changed. The Reform UK candidate was the party's leader, Nigel Farage.

Dates conducted	Pollster	Client	Sample size	Con	Lab	LD	Grn	Ref	Others	Lead
4 Jul 2024	2024 general election		–	27.9%	16.2%	4.4%	4.2%	46.2%	3.4%	18.3
10–19 Jun 2024	JL Partners	Friderichs Advisory Partners	502	21%	18%	6%	6%	48%	1%	27
11–13 Jun 2024	Survation	Arron Banks	506	27%	24%	2%	5%	42%	1%	15
9–12 Jan 2024	Survation	Arron Banks	509	38%	30%	6%	–	18%	9%	8
9–12 Jan 2024	Survation	Arron Banks	509	27%	23%	6%	–	37% (Note: With Nigel Farage as candidate; this poll was conducted before his candidacy was declared.)	8%	10
12 Dec 2019	2019 general election		–	71.9%	15.6%	6.2%	2.9%	–	3.4%	56.3

=== Gillingham and Rainham ===
Gillingham and Rainham maintained its 2019 boundaries at the 2024 general election.

Dates conducted	Pollster	Client	Sample size	Con	Lab	LD	Grn	Ref	Others	Lead
4 Jul 2024	2024 general election		–	28.2%	37.8%	5.5%	5.6%	21.4%	1.2%	9.6
5–16 Jun 2024	We Think	The Economist	376	23%	55%	5%	2%	15%	0%	32
12 Dec 2019	2019 general election		–	61.3%	28.4%	5.4%	2.3%	–	2.6%	32.9

=== Godalming and Ash ===
Godalming and Ash was a new seat at the 2024 general election, mostly replacing South West Surrey. The Conservative Party's candidate was Chancellor of the Exchequer, Jeremy Hunt.

Dates conducted	Pollster	Client	Sample size	Con	LD	Lab	Ref	Grn	Others	Lead
7 Jul 2024	2024 general election		–	42.6%	41.0%	5.0%	8.8%	2.3%	0.4%	1.6
16–20 Feb 2024	Survation	38 Degrees	507	29%	35%	23%	8%	3%	2%	6
12 Dec 2019	2019 general election		–	53.4%	34.1%	8.9%	–	1.6%	–	14.6

=== Hartlepool ===
Hartlepool maintained its 2019 boundaries at the 2024 general election.

Dates conducted	Pollster	Client	Sample size	Lab	Con	Ref	LD	Grn	Lee (Ind)	Others	Lead
4 Jul 2024	2024 general election		–	46.2%	21.9%	24.5%	1.6%	2.3%	2.5%	3.4%	21.7
30 May 2023 – 9 Jun 2024	We Think	The Economist	448	58%	10%	23%	6%	2%	–	1%	35
6 May 2021	2021 by-election		–	28.7%	51.9%	1.2%	1.2%	1.2%	9.7%	6.0%	23.2
23–29 Apr 2021	Survation	Good Morning Britain	517	33%	50%	1%	1%	3%	6%	8%	17
29 Mar – 3 Apr 2021	Survation	Communication Workers Union	502	42%	49%	1%	1% (Note: Candidate unspecified, question asked about "a Liberal Democrat candidate".)	1% (Note: Candidate unspecified, question asked about "a Green Party candidate".)	–	7%	7
18–21 Mar 2021	Focaldata	The Times	5,265 (Note: Conducted as part of a wider MRP poll across 83 constituencies within the North.)	39%	36%	9%	3%	7%	–	6%	3
12 Dec 2019	2019 general election		–	37.7%	28.9%	25.8%	4.1%	–	–	3.4%	8.8

=== Holborn and St Pancras ===
Between the 2019 and 2024 general elections the boundaries of Holborn and St Pancras were changed. The Labour Party candidate was the party's leader, Sir Keir Starmer.

Dates conducted	Pollster	Client	Sample size	Lab	Con	LD	Grn	Ref	Feinstein (Ind)	Others	Lead
4 Jul 2024	2024 general election		–	48.9%	7.2%	5.8%	10.4%	6.1%	18.9%	2.5% Wais Islam on 1.6% Official Monster Raving Loony Party on 0.4% UKIP on 0.2% Socialist Equality Party on 0.2% Senthil Kumar on 0.1% Bobby Smith on 0.0%	30.0
19–21 Jun 2024	Survation	38 Degrees	317	54%	9%	9%	14%	5%	6%	4% Official Monster Raving Loony Party on 2% Bobby Smith on 1% Senthil Kumar on 1% Wais Islam on 0%	40
12 Dec 2019	2019 general election		–	66.0%	15.2%	12.2%	4.6%	1.8%	–	0.3%	50.8

=== Islington North ===
Islington North maintained its 2019 boundaries at the 2024 general election. Jeremy Corbyn, the incumbent MP and former Leader of the Labour Party, stood as an independent candidate following his suspension from the party in 2020.

Dates conducted	Pollster	Client	Sample size	Lab	Corbyn (Ind) (Note: Corbyn was the Labour Party candidate in 2019.)	LD	Con	Grn	Ref	Others	Lead
4 Jul 2024	2024 general election		–	34.4%	49.2%	3.4%	4.0%	5.4%	3.5%	0.4%	14.8
20–25 Jun 2024	Survation	Stats for Lefties	514	43%	29%	7%	6%	7%	6%	2%	14
12 Dec 2019	2019 general election		–	64.3%		15.6%	10.2%	8.0%	1.4%	0.4%	48.7

=== Mid Bedfordshire ===
Between the 2019 and 2024 general elections the boundaries of Mid Bedfordshire were changed. The 2023 by-election was contested on the 2019 boundaries.

Dates conducted	Pollster	Client	Sample size	Con	Lab	LD	Grn	Ref	Others	Lead
4 Jul 2024	2024 general election		–	34.1%	31.4%	8.2%	5.2%	17.3%	3.7%	2.7
19 Oct 2023	2023 by-election		–	31.1%	34.1%	23.1%	1.8%	3.7%	6.7%	3.0
12–15 Sep 2023	Survation	Labour Together	559	34%	34%	16%	6%	6%	4%	Tie
12 Dec 2019	2019 general election		–	60.5%	20.5%	12.5%	3.9%	–	2.6%	40.0

=== North Herefordshire ===
Between the 2019 and 2024 general elections the boundaries of North Herefordshire were changed.

Dates conducted	Pollster	Client	Sample size	Con	Lab	LD	Grn	Ref	Others	Lead
4 Jul 2024	2024 general election		–	31.5%	6.4%	2.9%	43.2%	16.0%	0.2%	11.7
6–14 Jun 2024	We Think	The Green Party	501	28%	15%	4%	39%	13%	–	11
12 Dec 2019	2019 general election		–	62.5%	15.2%	13.5%	8.8%	–	–	47.3

=== Portsmouth North ===
Portsmouth North maintained its 2019 boundaries at the 2024 general election. The Conservative Party's candidate was Penny Mordaunt, the Leader of the House of Commons.

Dates conducted	Pollster	Client	Sample size	Con	Lab	LD	Grn	Ref	Others	Lead
4 Jul 2024	2024 general election		–	33.0%	34.8%	7.3%	4.5%	20.4%	–	1.8
9–19 Apr 2024	Techne	Penny Mordaunt	1,000	39%	35%	7%	4%	15%	–	4
12 Dec 2019	2019 general election		–	61.4%	27.0%	7.4%	2.8%	–	1.4%	34.4

=== Richmond and Northallerton ===
Richmond and Northallerton was a new seat at the 2024 general election. The Conservative Party candidate was the party's leader and prime minister, Rishi Sunak.

Dates conducted	Pollster	Client	Sample size	Con	Lab	LD	Grn	Ref	Others	Lead
4 Jul 2024	2024 general election		–	47.5%	22.4%	8.9%	4.2%	14.7%	2.3%	25.1
12–21 Jun 2024	Survation	38 Degrees	331	39%	28%	9%	4%	18%	3% Bin on 1% Yrk on 1% Omilana (Ind) on 1% Richmond (Ind) on 0% WPB on 0%	11
12 Dec 2019	2019 general election		–	63.3%	16.4%	12.5%	3.8%	–	3.9%	46.9

=== Waveney Valley ===
Waveney Valley was a new seat at the 2024 general election. The Green Party candidate was one of its co-leaders, Adrian Ramsay.

Dates conducted	Pollster	Client	Sample size	Con	Lab	LD	Grn	Ref	Others	Lead
4 Jul 2024	2024 general election		–	30.3%	9.4%	2.5%	41.7%	15.8%	0.2%	11.4
6–14 Jun 2024	We Think	The Green Party	500	24%	17%	7%	37%	16%	–	13
12 Dec 2019	2019 general election		–	62.2%	27.0%	9.2%	9.3%	–	0.7%	35.2

=== Wokingham ===
Between the 2019 and 2024 general elections the boundaries of Wokingham were changed.

Dates conducted	Pollster	Client	Sample size	Con	LD	Lab	Grn	Others	Lead
4 Jul 2024	2024 general election		–	32.2%	47.7%	6.7%	3.6%	9.8%	15.5
31 Aug – 21 Sep 2021	Opinium	Greenpeace	607	42%	22%	24%	8%	3%	18
12 Dec 2019	2019 general election		–	55.5%	32.3%	9.9%	2.2%	0.1%	23.2

=== Wycombe ===
Wycombe maintained its 2019 boundaries at the 2024 general election.

Dates conducted	Pollster	Client	Sample size	Con	Lab	LD	Grn	Others	Lead
4 Jul 2024	2024 general election		–	25.6%	35.9%	9.5%	4.9%	24%	10.3
31 Aug – 21 Sep 2021	Opinium	Greenpeace	532	37%	33%	16%	8%	5%	4
12 Dec 2019	2019 general election		–	43.1%	39.9%	11.3%	2.6%	3.1%	3.2

=== Ynys Môn ===
Ynys Môn maintained its 2019 boundaries at the 2024 general election.

Dates conducted	Pollster	Client	Sample size	Con	Lab	PC	Ref	LD	Others	Lead
4 Jul 2024	2024 general election		–	30.5%	23.4%	32.5%	9.9%	1.4%	2.5%	2
21 Dec 2023 – 5 Jan 2024	Survation	Plaid Cymru	507	26%	27%	39%	4%	1%	3%	12
12 Dec 2019	2019 general election		–	35.5%	30.1%	28.5%	6.0%	–	–	5.4

== Other polling ==
=== "Red wall" ===
Polling firms published polls of the "red wall", which took respondents from a selection of constituencies gained by the Conservatives in the 2019 general election. Different pollsters used different sets of constituencies for their polling.

==== Deltapoll ====
Deltapoll published a poll of the 57 constituencies that the Conservatives gained from Labour and the Liberal Democrats without specifying any regions.

Dates conducted	Pollster	Client	Sample size	Con	Lab	LD	Other	Lead
23–30 Dec 2021	Deltapoll	The Mail on Sunday	612	33%	49%	8%	10%	16
12 Dec 2019	2019 general election		–	47.4%	37.3%	6.9%	8.4%	10.1

==== Focaldata ====
Focaldata published a poll of the 44 seats the Conservatives gained from Labour in northern England and the Midlands.

Dates conducted	Pollster	Client	Sample size	Con	Lab	LD	Other	Lead
29–30 Apr 2021	Focaldata	The Times	573	44%	45%	1%	3%	1
12 Dec 2019	2019 general election		–	47.8%	39.0%	4.8%	8.4%	8.8

==== JL Partners ====
JL Partners published polls of forty-five seats the Conservative Party gained from the Labour Party across northern England, the Midlands and Wales, apart from Bridgend, Clwyd South, the Vale of Clwyd, Wrexham and Ynys Môn.

Dates conducted	Pollster	Client	Sample size	Con	Lab	LD	Other	Lead
2–8 Mar 2023	JL Partners	Channel 4 News	508	28%	53%	7%	12%	25
7–22 Feb 2023	JL Partners	Channel 4 News	520	30%	56%	6%	8%	26
14–27 Sep 2022	JL Partners	Kekst CNC and Conservatives in Communication	538	34%	54%	7%	5%	20
6–16 Jan 2022	JL Partners	Channel 4 News	518	37%	48%	8%	7%	11
25 Nov – 6 Dec 2021	JL Partners	Channel 4 News	–	45%	43%	6%	5%	2
17–25 Mar 2021	JL Partners	Channel 4 News	500	47%	43%	4%	6%	4
19–30 Nov 2020	JL Partners	Channel 4 News	499	41%	47%	3%	8%	6
12 Dec 2019	2019 general election		–	47.7%	39.1%	4.8%	8.3%	8.6

==== Redfield & Wilton Strategies ====
Redfield & Wilton Strategies published polls of 37 constituencies won by the Conservatives in 2019 that had been held by Labour in 2010, 2015 and 2017, as well as Burnley, Redcar and Vale of Clwyd

Dates conducted	Pollster	Client	Sample size	Con	Lab	Ref	LD	Grn	PC	Other	Lead
4 Jul 2024	2024 general election		–	24.1%	40.7%	21.7%	4.7%	4.8%	1.9%	2.2%	16.6
11–12 May 2024	Redfield & Wilton	N/A	TBC	22%	47%	16%	7%	5%	1%	1%	25
13–14 Apr 2024	Redfield & Wilton	N/A	1,000	24%	44%	18%	6%	5%	1%	2%	20
16 Mar 2024	Redfield & Wilton	N/A	1,072	24%	48%	16%	5%	4%	1%	1%	24
25 Feb 2024	Redfield & Wilton	N/A	1,000	25%	49%	14%	6%	4%	1%	2%	24
30–31 Jan 2024	Redfield & Wilton	N/A	1,055	28%	48%	14%	4%	5%	1%	1%	20
17–18 Dec 2023	Redfield & Wilton	N/A	975	28%	48%	11%	7%	4%	1%	1%	20
19 Nov 2023	Redfield & Wilton	N/A	1,000	26%	50%	11%	5%	6%	1%	1%	24
22 Oct 2023	Redfield & Wilton	N/A	1,000	32%	48%	6%	7%	4%	1%	2%	16
23 Sep 2023	Redfield & Wilton	N/A	1,250	31%	45%	10%	6%	6%	1%	1%	14
3 Sep 2023	Redfield & Wilton	N/A	1,000	32%	48%	6%	7%	3%	2%	3%	16
20 Aug 2023	Redfield & Wilton	N/A	1,060	28%	53%	7%	6%	4%	1%	1%	25
6 Aug 2023	Redfield & Wilton	N/A	1,400	28%	49%	8%	8%	4%	2%	1%	21
23 Jul 2023	Redfield & Wilton	N/A	1,000	30%	48%	10%	6%	4%	2%	1%	18
9 Jul 2023	Redfield & Wilton	N/A	1,150	27%	52%	9%	6%	4%	1%	2%	25
25 Jun 2023	Redfield & Wilton	N/A	1,020	26%	53%	9%	6%	4%	1%	1%	27
11 Jun 2023	Redfield & Wilton	N/A	1,200	28%	50%	8%	7%	4%	1%	2%	22
28 May 2023	Redfield & Wilton	N/A	1,158	31%	48%	7%	7%	4%	1%	1%	17
14 May 2023	Redfield & Wilton	N/A	1,100	29%	52%	7%	7%	4%	1%	0%	23
30 Apr 2023	Redfield & Wilton	N/A	1,000	30%	48%	6%	8%	5%	2%	1%	18
16 Apr 2023	Redfield & Wilton	N/A	1,000	31%	47%	7%	7%	5%	1%	2%	16
3 Apr 2023	Redfield & Wilton	N/A	1,000	30%	49%	9%	6%	4%	1%	1%	19
19 Mar 2023	Redfield & Wilton	N/A	1,100	32%	48%	8%	6%	4%	1%	2%	16
5 Mar 2023	Redfield & Wilton	N/A	1,000	29%	51%	9%	6%	2%	1%	2%	22
19 Feb 2023	Redfield & Wilton	N/A	1,000	27%	55%	10%	4%	3%	1%	1%	28
5 Feb 2023	Redfield & Wilton	N/A	1,100	29%	52%	8%	5%	4%	1%	1%	23
23 Jan 2023	Redfield & Wilton	N/A	1,200	27%	53%	9%	5%	4%	1%	1%	26
8–9 Jan 2023	Redfield & Wilton	N/A	1,200	29%	51%	9%	5%	3%	1%	1%	22
21–22 Nov 2022	Redfield & Wilton	ITV Peston	1,500	30%	53%	5%	6%	3%	1%	1%	23
5–6 Nov 2022	Redfield & Wilton	N/A	1,000	28%	53%	6%	5%	4%	2%	1%	25
24–25 Oct 2022	Redfield & Wilton	N/A	1,500	28%	56%	5%	8%	2%	1%	1%	28
16–17 Oct 2022	Redfield & Wilton	N/A	1,500	21%	61%	8%	5%	3%	1%	1%	40
3–4 Oct 2022	Redfield & Wilton	N/A	1,500	23%	61%	3%	7%	4%	1%	1%	38
18–19 Sep 2022	Redfield & Wilton	N/A	1,500	34%	49%	7%	5%	4%	0%	1%	15
4 Sep 2022	Redfield & Wilton	N/A	1,500	31%	48%	7%	7%	5%	1%	1%	17
21 Aug 2022	Redfield & Wilton	N/A	1,500	34%	47%	5%	8%	3%	2%	1%	13
8 Aug 2022	Redfield & Wilton	N/A	1,500	33%	48%	6%	7%	5%	1%	3%	15
25–26 Jul 2022	Redfield & Wilton	N/A	1,500	34%	45%	3%	10%	5%	1%	3%	11
11 Jul 2022	Redfield & Wilton	N/A	1,500	32%	46%	7%	10%	4%	0%	1%	13
26–27 Jun 2022	Redfield & Wilton	N/A	1,500	35%	46%	3%	8%	3%	1%	2%	11
12–13 Jun 2022	Redfield & Wilton	N/A	1,500	36%	46%	6%	5%	4%	2%	2%	10
12 Dec 2019	2019 general election		–	46.7%	38.0%	6.5%	4.5%	1.4%	1.2%	1.7%	8.7

==== YouGov ====
YouGov published polls of all fifty seats the Conservative Party gained from the Labour Party across northern England, the Midlands and Wales.

Dates conducted	Pollster	Client	Sample size	Con	Lab	LD	Other	Lead
17–28 Sep 2021	YouGov (MRP)	The Times	9,931	41%	40%	5%	14%	1
6–18 Sep 2021	YouGov	N/A	794	44%	38%	4%	14%	6
12 Dec 2019	2019 general election		–	47.3%	39.0%	4.7%	8.9%	8.3

=== "Blue wall" ===
Polling firms published polls of the "blue wall", which took respondents from constituencies held by the Conservatives but which might be gained by Labour or the Liberal Democrats. Different pollsters used different sets of constituencies for their polling.

==== JL Partners ====
JL Partners published a poll of the forty-five seats in southern England which the Conservatives won in 2019 with a majority of under 10,000 votes.

Dates conducted	Pollster	Client	Sample size	Con	Lab	LD	Grn	Other	Lead
14–27 Sep 2022	JL Partners	Kekst CNC and Conservatives in Communication	521	34%	40%	20%	3%	3%	6
12 Dec 2019	2019 general election		–	48.5%	26.6%	21.1%	1.7%	2.1%	21.9

==== More in Common ====
More in Common published a poll of the thirty-nine seats which the Conservatives won in 2019 and saw the largest total swing towards Labour and the Liberal Democrats in the 2017 and 2019 elections.

Dates conducted	Pollster	Client	Sample size	Con	LD	Lab	Grn	Ref	Other	Lead
20 Feb – 2 Mar 2024	More in Common	N/A	1,005	32%	20%	33%	5%	10%	1%	1
12 Dec 2019	2019 general election		–	51%	25%	20%	2%	0%	2%	26

==== Opinium ====
Opinium published a poll of the forty-one constituencies held by the Conservatives since 2010, where Labour or the Liberal Democrats outperformed their national swing against the Conservatives in 2017 and 2019, with a majority of under 10,000.

Dates conducted	Pollster	Client	Sample size	Con	Lab	LD	Grn	Other	Lead
31 Aug – 21 Sep 2021	Opinium	Greenpeace	1,000	43%	34%	14%	5%	4%	9
12 Dec 2019	2019 general election		–	48.6%	30.7%	17.6%	1.6%	1.5%	17.9

==== Redfield & Wilton Strategies ====
Redfield and Wilton Strategies published polls of the forty-two constituencies in southern England which voted Conservative in the last three general elections, where more than a quarter of adults have degrees, where more than 42.5% of voters are estimated to have voted to remain in the European Union in the 2016 referendum, and where the Conservative majority over Labour was under 10,000 or the Conservative majority over the Liberal Democrats was under 15,000, in the 2019 general election. (Note: These are: Bournemouth East, Chelsea and Fulham, Cheltenham, Chingford and Woodford Green, Chippenham, Chipping Barnet, Cities of London and Westminster, Colchester, Esher and Walton, Filton and Bradley Stoke, Finchley and Golders Green, Guildford, Harrow East, Hendon, Henley, Hitchin and Harpenden, Lewes, Milton Keynes North, Milton Keynes South, Mole Valley, Reading West, Romsey and Southampton North, South Cambridgeshire, South East Cambridgeshire, South West Surrey, St Ives, Sutton and Cheam, Taunton Deane, Thornbury and Yate, Totnes, Truro and Falmouth, Tunbridge Wells, Uxbridge and South Ruislip, Wantage, Watford, Wells, West Dorset, Wimbledon, Winchester, Woking, Wokingham, and Wycombe.)

Dates conducted	Pollster	Client	Sample size	Con	LD	Lab	Grn	Ref	Other	Lead
28 Apr 2024	Redfield & Wilton	N/A	880	25%	23%	34%	5%	11%	1%	9
31 Mar 2024	Redfield & Wilton	N/A	1,040	26%	20%	34%	6%	14%	0%	8
3 Mar 2024	Redfield & Wilton	N/A	1,195	28%	19%	37%	5%	10%	1%	9
11 Feb 2024	Redfield & Wilton	N/A	1,000	30%	21%	37%	4%	7%	2%	7
17–18 Jan 2024	Redfield & Wilton	N/A	1,000	30%	24%	31%	2%	11%	1%	1
4 Dec 2023	Redfield & Wilton	N/A	800	29%	26%	30%	3%	11%	1%	1
5 Nov 2023	Redfield & Wilton	N/A	1,050	30%	25%	34%	4%	6%	1%	4
7 Oct 2023	Redfield & Wilton	N/A	1,000	36%	25%	32%	3%	4%	1%	4
10 Sep 2023	Redfield & Wilton	N/A	1,086	31%	26%	33%	4%	6%	1%	2
26–27 Aug 2023	Redfield & Wilton	N/A	1,274	32%	25%	33%	4%	5%	1%	1
12–13 Aug 2023	Redfield & Wilton	N/A	1,400	33%	25%	32%	5%	5%	0%	1
30 Jul 2023	Redfield & Wilton	N/A	1,150	31%	24%	35%	3%	6%	1%	4
16 Jul 2023	Redfield & Wilton	N/A	1,154	32%	23%	36%	5%	5%	0%	4
2 Jul 2023	Redfield & Wilton	N/A	1,000	29%	25%	36%	4%	5%	1%	7
17–18 Jun 2023	Redfield & Wilton	N/A	1,100	31%	22%	38%	4%	5%	0%	7
4 Jun 2023	Redfield & Wilton	N/A	1,328	30%	26%	34%	5%	5%	1%	4
22 May 2023	Redfield & Wilton	N/A	1,000	34%	22%	33%	3%	6%	2%	1
7 May 2023	Redfield & Wilton	N/A	1,090	32%	23%	36%	2%	5%	1%	4
23 Apr 2023	Redfield & Wilton	N/A	1,000	32%	24%	34%	5%	5%	1%	2
9 Apr 2023	Redfield & Wilton	N/A	1,228	35%	20%	37%	5%	4%	0%	2
26 Mar 2023	Redfield & Wilton	N/A	1,500	31%	21%	39%	4%	4%	0%	8
12 Mar 2023	Redfield & Wilton	N/A	1,250	34%	23%	36%	3%	4%	1%	2
26 Feb 2023	Redfield & Wilton	N/A	1,150	32%	18%	41%	5%	4%	1%	9
11–12 Feb 2023	Redfield & Wilton	N/A	1,100	34%	17%	41%	4%	3%	2%	7
28–29 Jan 2023	Redfield & Wilton	N/A	1,200	32%	19%	42%	4%	4%	0%	10
11 Jan 2023	Redfield & Wilton	N/A	1,200	30%	21%	40%	3%	6%	1%	10
21–22 Nov 2022	Redfield & Wilton	ITV Peston	1,200	30%	21%	41%	4%	3%	1%	11
13–14 Nov 2022	Redfield & Wilton	N/A	1,250	32%	23%	38%	2%	4%	0%	6
29 Oct 2022	Redfield & Wilton	N/A	1,250	33%	16%	44%	2%	4%	1%	11
7–8 Oct 2022	Redfield & Wilton	N/A	1,500	28%	24%	41%	4%	3%	4%	13
12 Dec 2019	2019 general election		–	49.7%	27.4%	20.6%	1.3%	-	0.9%	22.3

==== YouGov ====
YouGov specified the blue wall to be constituencies held by the Conservative Party in the South or East of England in the 2019 election, with a population which by majority voted to remain in the European Union and have a higher level of graduates than the country at large.

Dates conducted	Pollster	Client	Sample size	Con	LD	Lab	Grn	Other	Lead
6–18 Sep 2021	YouGov	N/A	841	45%	15%	26%	11%	4%	19
20–28 Jul 2021	YouGov	N/A	1,141	44%	18%	24%	9%	6%	20
12 Dec 2019	2019 general election		–	51.7%	24.0%	19.7%	2.4%	2.2%	27.7

=== Other geographical samples ===
==== England and Wales ====
Find Out Now conducted a poll of voters in England and Wales.

Date(s) conducted	Pollster	Client	Sample size	Con	Lab	LD	Grn	Others	Lead
4–6 Jun 2021	Find Out Now	The Constitution Society	14,596	45%	36%	6%	1%	11%	9
12 Dec 2019	2019 general election		–	46.6%	34.3%	12.1%	2.9%	4.1%	12.3

==== Cornwall, Cumbria, Gwynedd, Norfolk, and North Yorkshire ====
Survation conducted a poll of voters in Cornwall, Cumbria, Gwynedd, Norfolk, and North Yorkshire.

Dates conducted	Pollster	Client	Sample size	Con	Lab	LD	Grn	Other	Lead
7–14 Mar 2022	Survation	Woodrow Communications	1,012	38%	36%	10%	8%	7% Reform UK on 3% Plaid Cymru on 2% UKIP on 1% Reclaim Party on 0% Other on 1%	2
12 Dec 2019	2019 general election		–	53.3%	25.8%	14.0%	2.2%	4.7	27.5

==== Coventry ====
Survation conducted a poll of voters in Coventry.

Dates conducted	Pollster	Client	Sample size	Lab	Con	LD	Ref	Grn	Other	Lead
1–11 Apr 2022	Survation	Unite the Union	528	52%	27%	6%	5%	6%	3% UKIP on 1% Reclaim Party on 0% Other on 2%	25
12 Dec 2019	2019 general election		–	46.5%	40.5%	6.0%	4.0%	2.7%	0.3%	6

==== Most rural constituencies ====
Survation published multiple polls of the 100 most rural constituencies in England.

Dates conducted	Pollster	Client	Sample size	Con	Lab	LD	Grn	Ref	Other	Lead
23–30 Jan 2024	Survation	Country Land and Business Association	1,092	34%	37%	14%	4%	9%	2%	3
13–24 Apr 2023	Survation	Country Land and Business Association	1,017	41%	36%	13%	5%	4%	0%	5
12 Dec 2019	2019 general election		–	58.9%	19.3%	16.6%	3.5%	0.6%	1.2%	39.6

==== "Conservative Celtic Fringe" ====
YouGov produced a poll of seats in South West England that had elected a Conservative MP in every election since the 2015 general election and where a majority of voters were estimated to have voted to leave the European Union in the 2016 United Kingdom European Union membership referendum. They branded these seats the "Conservative Celtic Fringe".

Dates conducted	Pollster	Client	Sample size	Con	Lab	LD	Ref	Grn	Other	Lead
1–15 Jun 2022	YouGov	N/A	813	38%	24%	22%	6%	8%	1%	14
12 Dec 2019	2019 general election		–	56.7%	19.2%	19.1%	0.1%	3.0%	1.9%	37.5

== See also ==
- Opinion polling for the 2024 United Kingdom general election
- Leadership approval opinion polling for the 2024 United Kingdom general election
- Opinion polling for the 2019 United Kingdom general election
- Opinion polling on the United Kingdom's membership of the European Union (2016–2020)
- Opinion polling for the next United Kingdom general election
- Opinion polling for the next Scottish Parliament election
- Opinion polling for the next Senedd election
