= Next Senedd election =

- On or before 2 May 2030

All 96 seats to the Senedd 49 seats needed for a majority

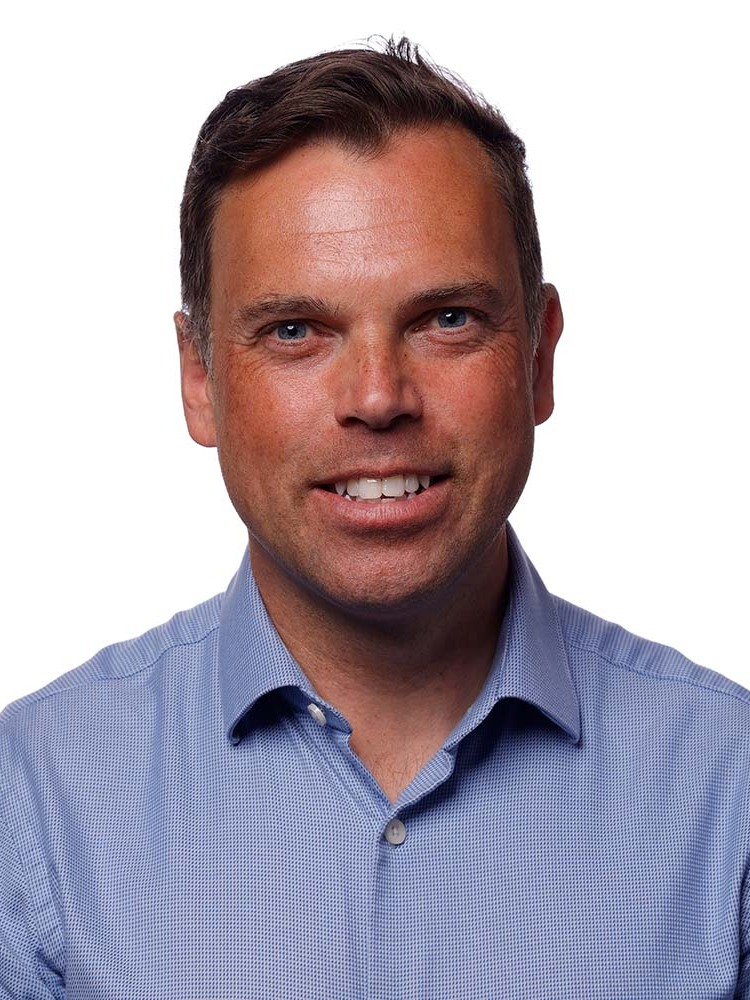

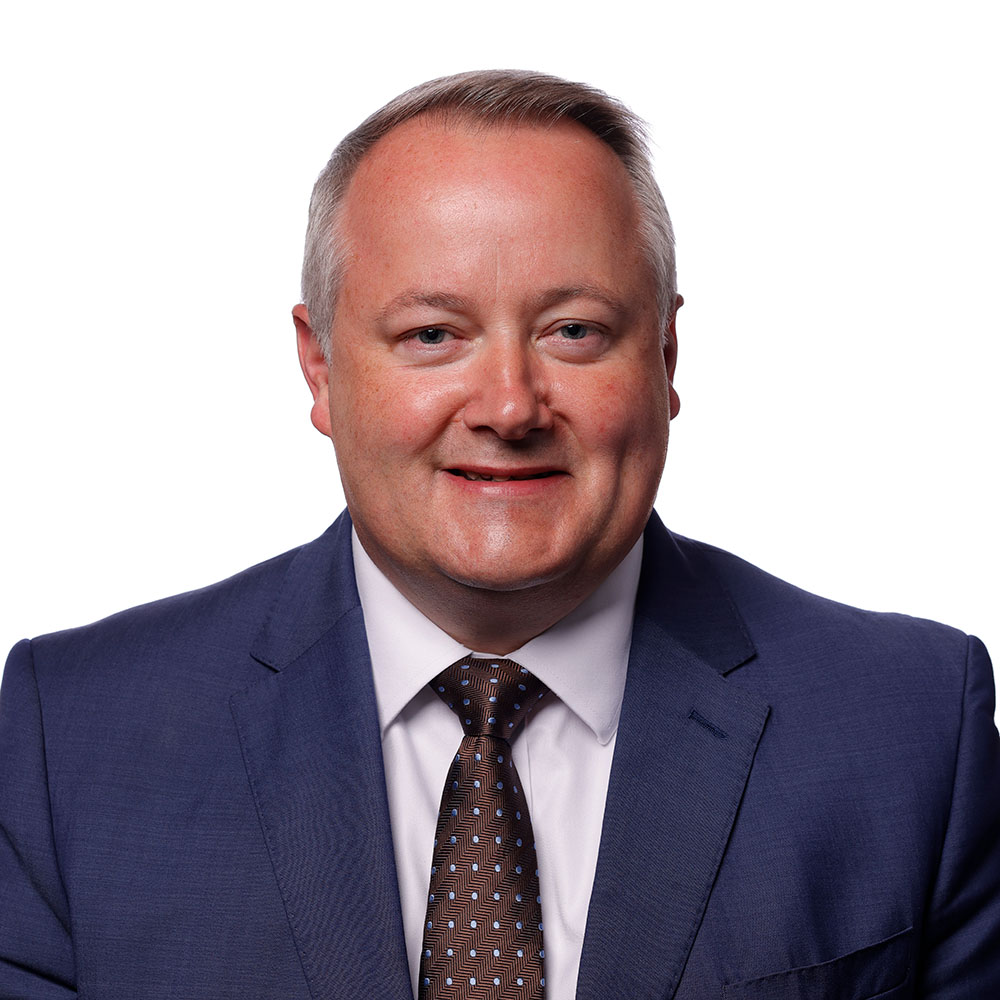

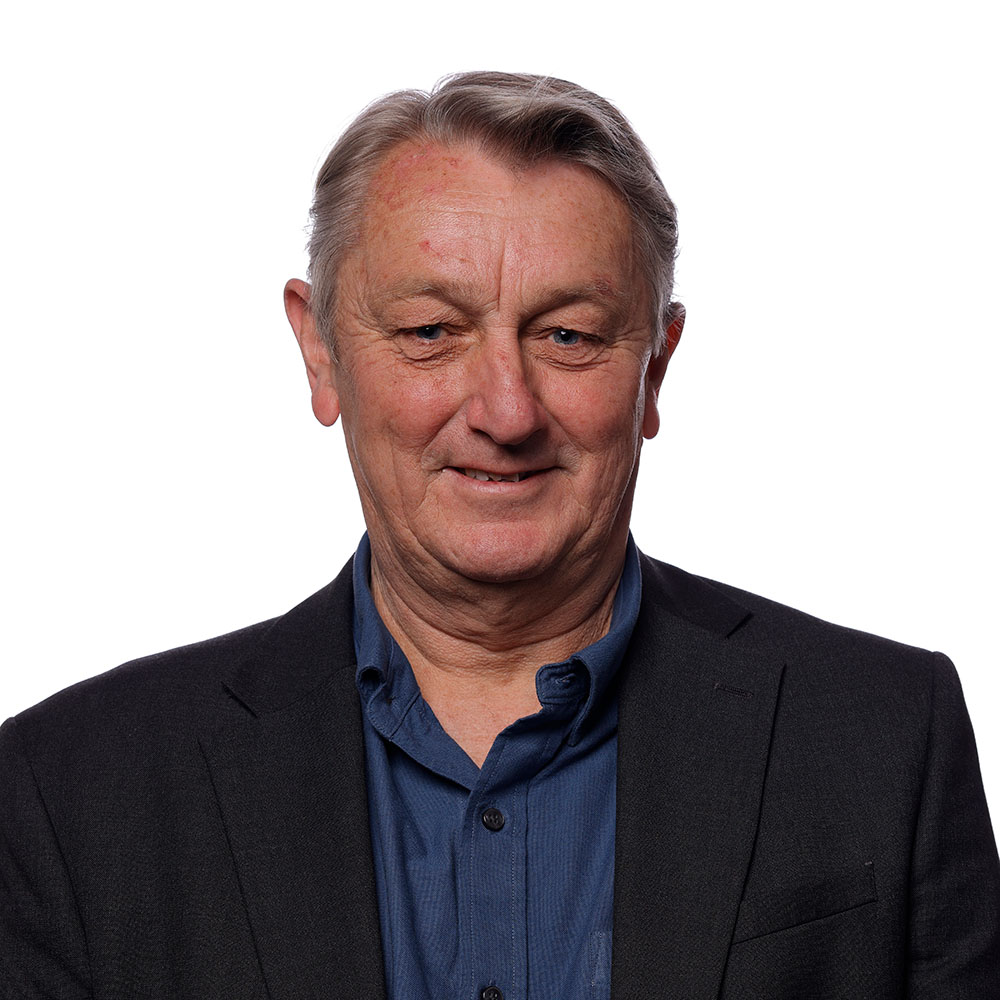

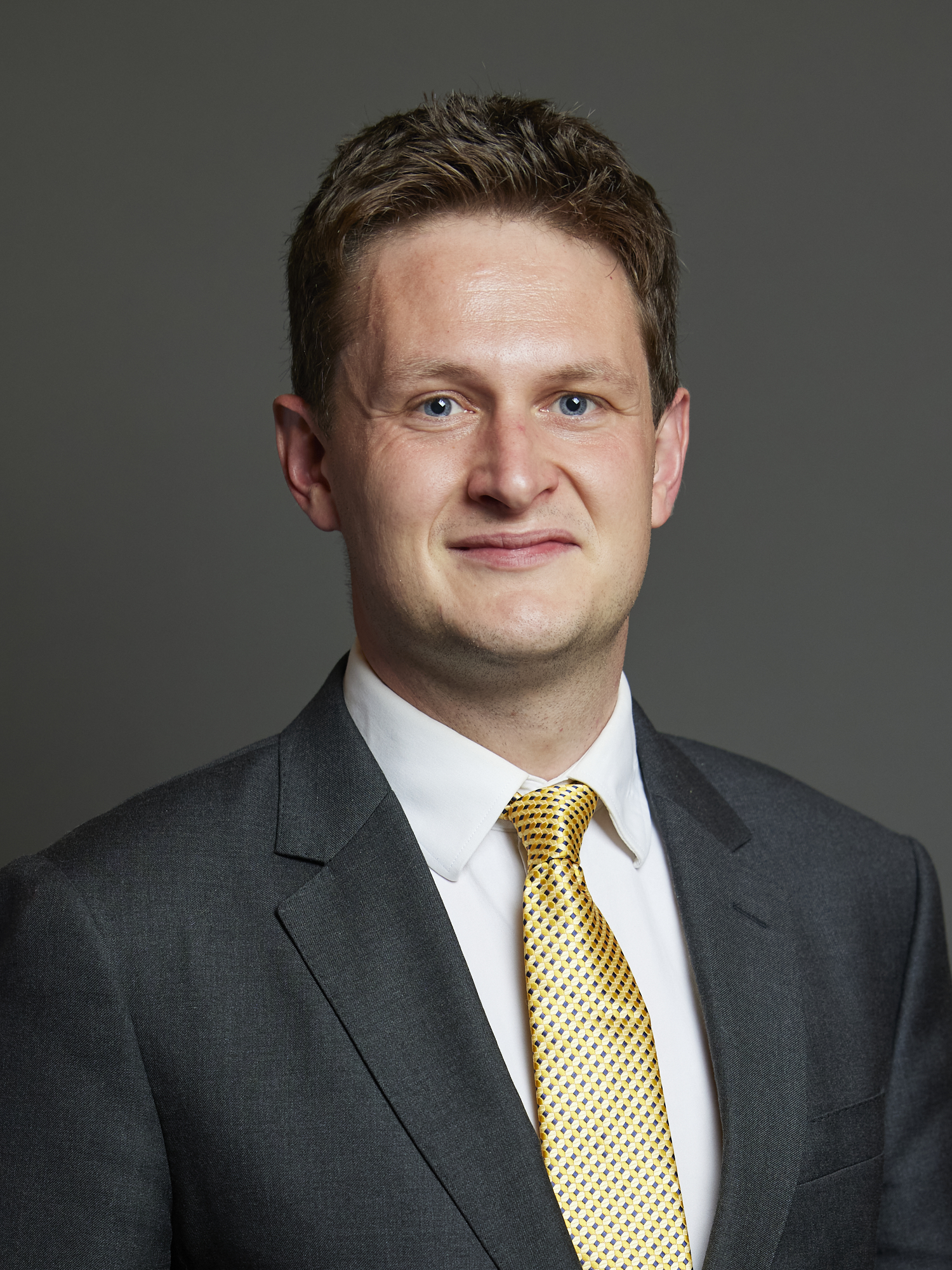
Leader	Rhun ap Iorwerth	Helen Jenner	Ken Skates
Party	Plaid Cymru	Reform	Labour
Leader since	16 June 2023	21 September 2026	15 July 2026
Leader's seat	Bangor Conwy Môn	Bangor Conwy Môn	Fflint Wrecsam
Last election	43 seats, 35.4%	34 seats, 29.3%	9 seats, 11.1%
Current seats	44	33	9
Leader	Darren Millar	Anthony Slaughter (outgoing)	David Chadwick
Party	Conservative	Green	Liberal Democrats
Leader since	5 December 2024	21 December 2018	16 November 2026
Leader's seat	Clwyd	Caerdydd Penarth	MP (not an MS) (Note: Chadwick sits in the House of Commons as the MP for Brecon, Radnor and Cwm Tawe rather than in the Senedd. Jane Dodds is the sole Liberal Democrats MS in the Senedd.)
Last election	7 seats, 10.7%	2 seats, 6.7%	1 seat, 4.5%
Current seats	7	2	1
Incumbent First Minister
Rhun ap Iorwerth
Plaid Cymru

An election for the Senedd (Welsh Parliament; Welsh: Senedd Cymru) is due to held on 2 May 2030, to elect all 96 members to the Senedd. Under the provisions of the Senedd Cymru (Members and Elections) Act 2024, Senedd terms were reduced from five-year to four-year terms since the previous election. It will be the eighth devolved general election since the Senedd (formerly the National Assembly for Wales) was established in 1999.

== Electoral system ==
The Senedd has 96 members, elected through closed list proportional representation (using the D'Hondt method) in sixteen six-member constituencies. A boundary review modifying the boundaries of the 16 constituencies is expected prior to the 2030 election, and was launched by Democracy and Boundary Commission Cymru on 9 September 2026. The new constituencies must sit within 10% of the Welsh average, so between 135,225 and 165,275 voters. The commission announced they could also consider bilingual names again if a Welsh-only name was unsuitable.

Voters are given one ballot, and vote for a political party or an independent candidate. The six members in their constituency are then distributed proportionally to the parties based on how many votes they received, electing the candidates in the order on their ranked party list. The ballot paper shows the list of (up to) eight candidates next to each party in order.

In the event that an elected Senedd member resigns, dies, or otherwise leaves office during the term, they are replaced by the member below them on their party's list. Should the relevant party's list for that constituency be exhausted, the seat remains vacant for the remainder of the term.

== Opinion polling ==
Opinion polls have been held since the 2026 election.

Dates conducted	Pollster	Client	Sample size	PC	Ref	Lab	Con	Grn	LD	Others	Lead
24-30 September 2026	More in Common	Cavendish Cymru	Unkown	32%	27%	18%	12%	6%	5%	1%	5
15-21 September 2026	Dan Thomas resigns as leader of Reform UK Wales, Helen Jenner is elected to replace him.										
15 September 2026	YouGov	ITV Wales	1,102	32%	27%	13%	11%	7%	5%	5%	5
13–24 August 2026	Survation	YesCymru	1,023	33%	31%	14%	9%	6%	5%	2%	2
7 May 2026	2026 Senedd election		–	35.4%	29.3%	11.1%	10.7%	6.7%	4.5%	2.3%	6.1
