= National Care Service =

Proposed publicly-funded social care systems in Great Britain

A National Care Service (NCS) is a proposed publicly funded system of social care for use in either England, Scotland or Wales. There have been different proposals for each of the three countries of the United Kingdom. A system in England was partially introduced by the Labour government of Gordon Brown in 2010 but abandoned soon after when the coalition government of David Cameron and Nick Clegg came to power in May 2010. Similar to the National Health Service, it would be free at the point of need and paid for through taxation.

Social care in the United Kingdom is a devolved policy, with governments in Scotland, Wales, and Northern Ireland responsible for their own social care systems. Northern Ireland has had a publicly-funded social care system since 1973, when it was integrated with its healthcare system, as Health and Social Care.

In 2021, the proposal had been adopted by the Welsh Government, where it has been gradually introduced since 2022 over a planned ten-year period, extending beyond 2030. In 2021, the Scottish Government also announced plans to introduce the NCS through the National Care Service (Scotland) Bill, but in 2025 these plans were scrapped with the NCS provisions of the bill removed in favour of a non-statutory advisory board on social care.

The UK Government has also resurrected plans to introduce the service in England since Labour's return to power under Keir Starmer in 2024, with Louise Casey tasked with leading an independent commission on how this could be set up and funded which is set to report back its first recommendations in 2026. Starmer's successor Andy Burnham also backed the proposal in September 2026, though would raise the proposals at the next United Kingdom general election.

== Background and history ==
The Labour government of Clement Attlee introduced a publicly funded system of health care with the establishment of the National Health Service (NHS) in 1948. Most people, however, have had to pay for social care, with publicly funded social care still available to those who pass a means test in which examinees must prove a lack of wealth and a high need for care. Publicly funded social care is also offered to some adults with "long-term complex health needs" through the NHS continuing healthcare scheme.

Social care in the United Kingdom is a devolved policy in Scotland, Wales, and Northern Ireland, with the Scottish Government, Welsh Government and Northern Ireland Executive each responsible for their own social care systems. Northern Ireland has had a publicly-funded social care system since 1973, when it was integrated with its healthcare system, as Health and Social Care.

=== 2010 England proposal and repeal ===
A "National Care Service" was first proposed in the later stages of Prime Minister Gordon Brown's Labour government. The Department of Health under Andy Burnham released its green paper Shaping the Future of Care Together in July 2009, which proposed a new National Care Service in England "on par with the NHS". This was followed by a public consultation in September called the "Big Care Debate", which was promoted by Brown as a "crucial national debate". The consultation found a public desire for social care reform and explored different ways to introduce the NCS in England. The government decided to introduce the NCS gradually and in different stages, with the first stage beginning with the Personal Care at Home Act 2010.

The Act was passed by parliament in April 2010, with the NCS being launched a month earlier by Health Secretary Andy Burnham, giving all elderly and disabled people free social care. The second stage was planned to begin from 2014 and would extend free social care to people who were in residential care for more than two years. A third and final stage would fully introduce the NCS, giving all adults free social care after 2015. However, the Labour government lost the May 2010 general election and the Conservative–Liberal Democrat coalition came to power. The coalition abandoned the NCS and the Personal Care at Home Act 2010 was later repealed.

== Current proposals ==
=== England ===
In opposition, the Labour Party under the leadership of Ed Miliband (2010–2015) continued calling for the introduction of an NCS that would give elderly and disabled people free social care. Under Jeremy Corbyn's leadership (2015–2020), the party promised to introduce the NCS in its manifestos for the 2017 and 2019 general elections, once again proposing free social care for all adults and also free personal care for the elderly. It was also supported by leader Keir Starmer (2020 – July 2026), who planned to introduce it as a needs-based, locally delivered system should Labour enter government. His Shadow Health Secretary Wes Streeting launched a review by the Fabian Society to see how it would operate and be funded, and aims to gradually introduce it over two or three terms of a Labour government, with a long-term aspiration of introducing the service on par with the NHS. The Fabian Society's report was released in June 2023. Its proposals only apply to England and include the recommendations that short-term care and support should be free and that support should be made available for everyone regardless of their means. The NCS was included in a draft Labour manifesto for the 2024 general election from May 2023 and was acknowledged as Labour Party policy by Streeting in October 2023. It was included in the Labour Party's published general election manifesto, Change.

Following Labour's election victory in 2024, Starmer's government confirmed plans to introduce the NCS. Streeting, who was now the new health secretary, said the government aspired to introduce "a new National Care Service, able to meet the needs of older and disabled people into the 21st Century". Baroness Louise Casey was tasked with chairing a cross-party independent commission on social care reform to find out how the NCS should be implemented and funded, with its first recommendations set to report back in 2026.

In September 2026, Starmer's successor as Prime Minister, Andy Burnham, also backed the proposals to introduce the service in England, offering free social care services to everyone in England. Burnham did not rule out raising taxes to fund such proposal. He would raise the proposals for voters to vote for at the next United Kingdom general election.

=== Wales ===
The devolved Labour-led government of Wales explored options for a Welsh NCS as part of its 2021 cooperation agreement with Plaid Cymru, with a plan for its implementation expected by the end of 2023. The Welsh branch of Labour had supported the NCS since the 2021 Senedd election. Since 2022, the Welsh government has gradually introduced the service over what is expected to be a ten-year period. After winning the 2026 Senedd election, the Plaid Cymru-led Welsh Government said a national care service in Wales would be unable to fully implement during the current Senedd term until the next Senedd election scheduled for 2030.

=== Scotland ===
Scottish Labour has been calling for the implementation of a Scottish NCS since 2011, with then party leader Iain Gray (2008–2011) negotiating the proposal with civil servants in 2010. The Scottish Conservatives supported the proposal, as did the Scottish National Party (SNP) government's then-Health Secretary Nicola Sturgeon, however Sturgeon and the SNP government ultimately rejected the proposal.

An independent review into Scottish adult social care was commissioned by First Minister Nicola Sturgeon in 2020, as a response to the damage to care homes caused by the COVID-19 pandemic in Scotland. This review was dubbed "The Feeley Review" after its author and chair Derek Feeley, the former chief executive of NHS Scotland, and was published in February 2021. The review recommended the establishment of a Scottish NCS on an equal footing with NHS Scotland, receiving centralised funding from the Scottish government. Health Secretary Jeane Freeman accepted the recommendation and the SNP promised to introduce the NCS as a "top priority" in government in its manifesto for the 2021 Scottish Parliament election, alongside the introduction of a national wage for care staff. The SNP said the new service would be fully operational in Scotland by 2026, but this was later delayed to 2029. Nationalising care homes was not part of the proposal, but it did mean ministers would get more power over social care. There was also a pledge to make social care free at the point of use, although this would not have included accommodation costs. In 2025, the SNP abandoned its plans to introduce the NCS due to budgetary concerns and a lack of support.

==== National Care Service (Scotland) Bill ====
The National Care Service (Scotland) Bill was introduced to the Scottish Parliament on 20 June 2022. If passed, the Bill as originally proposed would have established the NCS in Scotland and given Scottish ministers the ability to transfer social care services, which in Scotland are currently maintained by local authorities, to the new care service. In the case of children's services, ministers would have to hold a public consultation to be able to transfer them to the NCS. Some health services which are currently maintained by NHS Scotland and its Health Boards could also be transferred should the Bill pass. NCS Care Boards would deliver care on a local level, although transferred services could also be delivered nationally. The NCS and NHS Scotland would also share information, carers would have a right to take breaks and the proposed "Anne's Law", a law which would entitle care home residents to meeting people important to them, would also be enacted in the Bill.

The original Bill was met with controversy. Scottish Labour called the SNP's plans to introduce the NCS "the biggest power grab in the history of Holyrood", with deputy leader Jackie Baillie claiming that it would endanger local authorities, adding that it was "not a National Care Service" but a "national commissioning service which can be used as a fig leaf for centralising power". Other opposition parties raised concerns about the cost of the service, which was believed to have the possibility of redirecting nearly £1.3 billion of public money from frontline services to the NCS (£495 million for the overall service and another £726 million for its Care Boards). Trade unions GMB, Unison and Unite were also concerned about the centralisation of power away from local authorities that would be caused by the service, while the Convention of Scottish Local Authorities (COSLA) said in 2022 that it was currently taking "the time and consideration that is rightfully needed with legislation of this magnitude, to understand the breadth of the impact it will have on communities the length and breadth of Scotland".

In the years following the Bill's unveiling, the Scottish Government and other Scottish lawmakers clashed over an alleged lack of detail regarding how the NCS would be established and function, with the NCS budget of £2.2 billion over ten years targeted when Scottish Government ministers had to make budget cuts. Budgetary concerns led to delays, with the Scottish Government announcing in 2023 that its implementation had been delayed from 2026 to 2029, which led to more legislative difficulties as the Bill had to be reworked accordingly. In 2024, local council leaders walked out of Scottish Government negotiations on the NCS, which was later followed that year by the collapse of the SNP's coalition agreement with the Scottish Greens, which effectively made it untenable for the NCS to receive the support needed for its implementation, despite some opposition parties such as Labour remaining committed to the NCS. In January 2025, the Scottish Government abandoned its plans to introduce the NCS, with the Bill amended to remove all provisions relating to the NCS in favour of new plans to introduce a non-statutory advisory board on social care.
