= 2027 Scottish local elections =

- 6 May 2027

All 1,226 seats to 32 Scottish councils
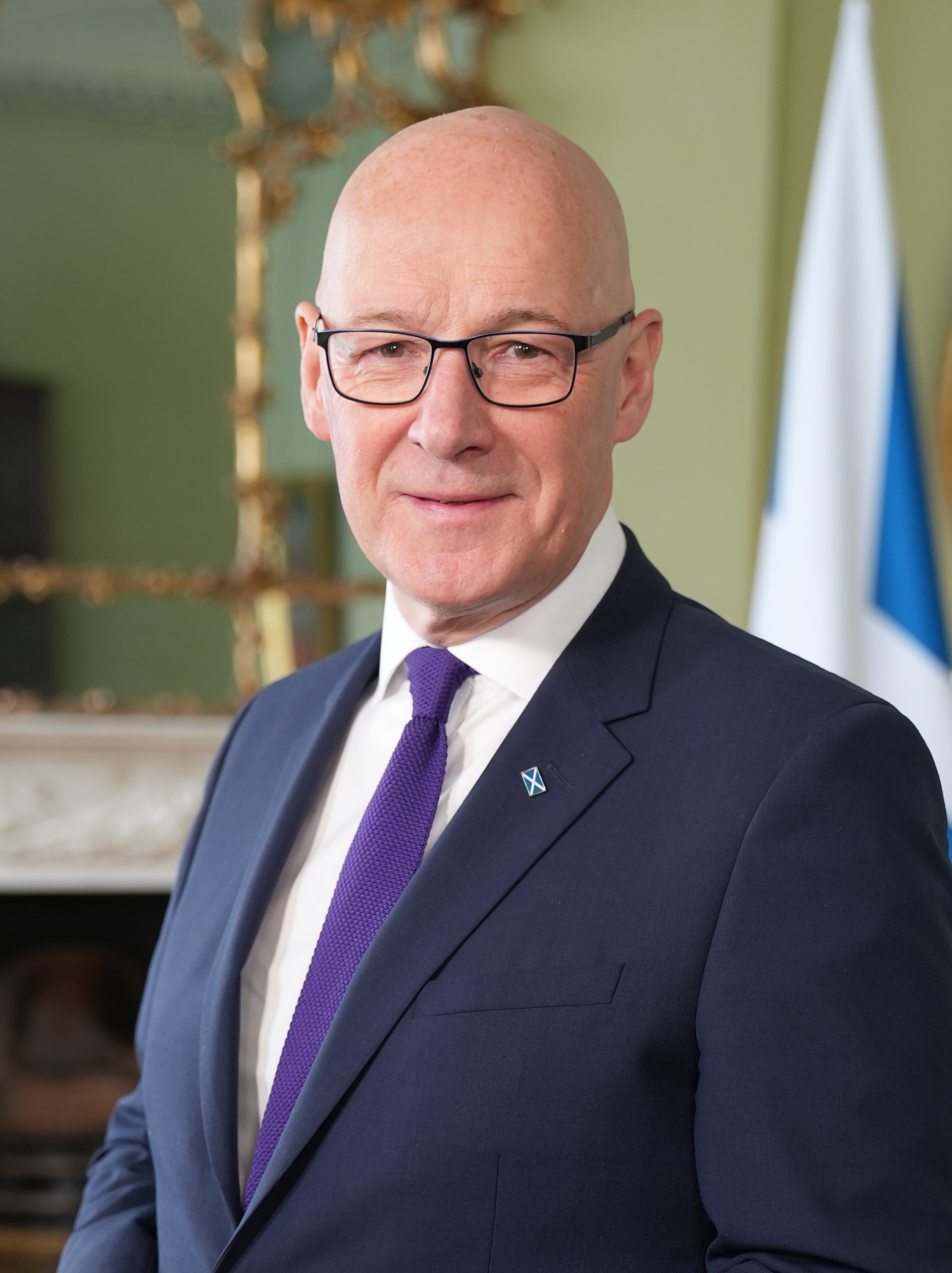

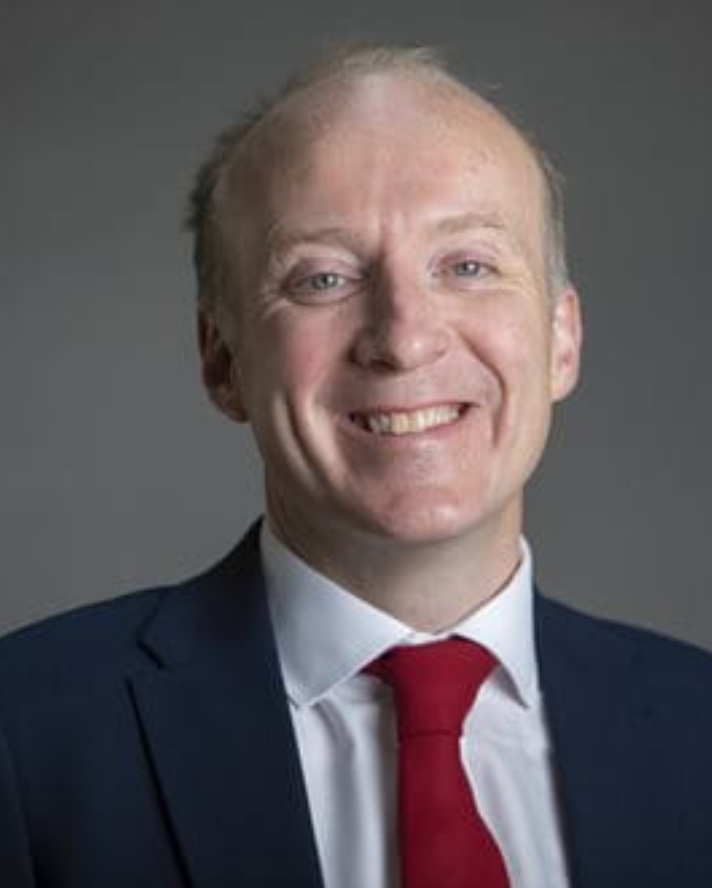

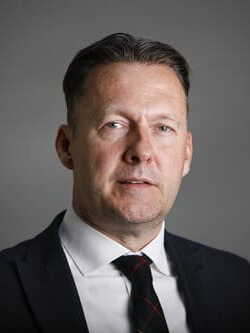

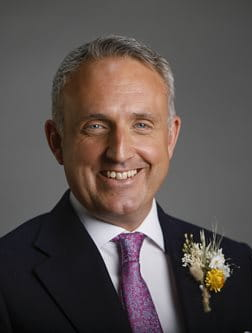

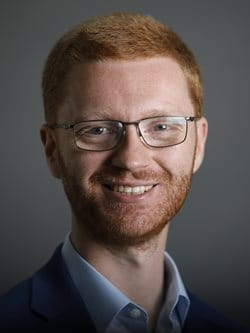

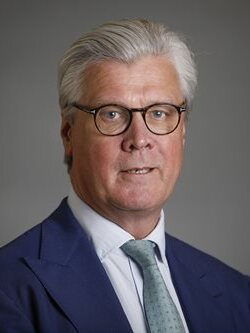
Leader	John Swinney	Michael Marra	Russell Findlay
Party	SNP	Labour	Conservative
Leader since	6 May 2024	19 September 2026	27 September 2024
Last election	453 seats, 34.1%	282 seats, 21.7%	214 seats, 19.7%
Current seats	413	258	172
	Ind
Leader	None	Alex Cole-Hamilton	Ross Greer / Gillian Mackay
Party	Independent	Liberal Democrats	Green
Leader since		20 August 2021	29 August 2025
Last election	152 seats, 8.4%	87 seats, 8.6%	35 seats, 6.0%
Current seats	236	88	32
Leader	Malcolm Offord
Party	Reform
Leader since	15 January 2026
Last election	Did not contest
Current seats	23

The 2027 Scottish local elections will be held on 6 May 2027, as part of the 2027 United Kingdom local elections. All 1,226 seats across all 32 Scottish local authorities are up for election.

== Background ==
The last election was in 2022, which was held five years after the 2017 election.

In the 2022 election, the SNP increased its vote share and won a record high result - and secured an overall majority on Dundee City Council, whilst Labour won overall control of West Dunbartonshire Council.

== Voting system and eligibility to vote ==
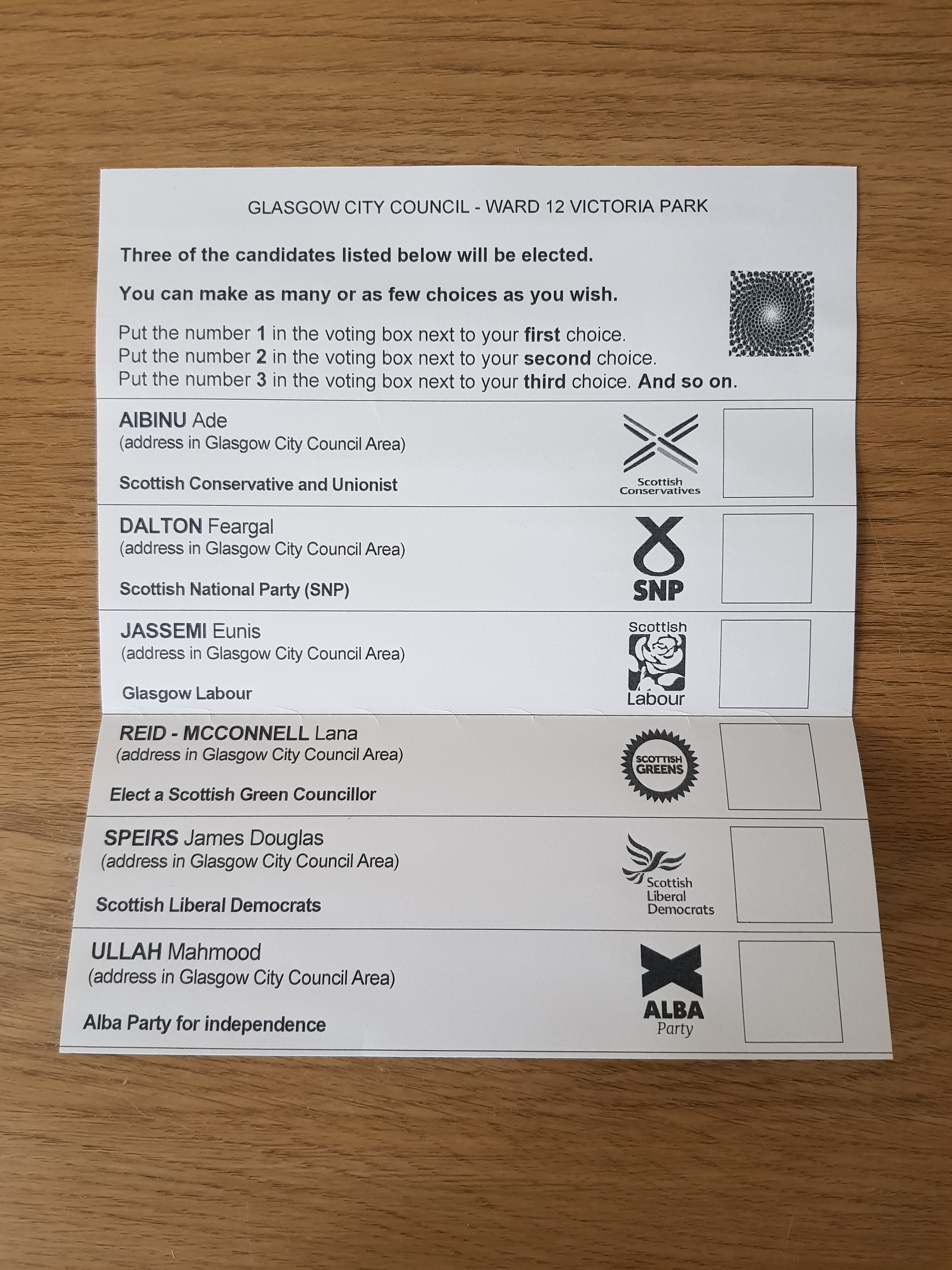
Ballot paper used for the 2022 elections in the Victoria Park ward of the Glasgow City Council

Councillors are elected to represent multi-member wards using the single transferable vote (STV) method, which has been used for all elections to local authorities in Scotland since the 2007 election. Mainland wards may have between 2 and 5 councillors, and single councillor wards are permitted where such a ward includes an inhabited island. For these elections wards represented by one, two or five councillors will only be contested in the four council areas in which ward boundaries have been redrawn after 2017, namely Na h-Eileanan an Iar, North Ayrshire, Orkney and Shetland.

Overall, the 32 local authorities have one one-seat district (Arran), seven two-seat districts and three five-seat districts (North Ayrshire) in addition to the bulk of the members elected in three- and four-seat districts.

All registered electors (British citizens and foreign nationals of another country who are permitted to enter or stay in the UK) who are aged 16 or over on polling day are entitled to vote in the local elections. A person who has two homes (such as a university student who has a term-time address and lives at home during holidays) can register to vote at both addresses as long as they are not in the same electoral area, and can vote in the local elections for the two different local councils.

== Opinion polling ==
First preference voting intention
Date(s) conducted	Polling organisation/client	Sample size	SNP	Con	Lab	Lib Dem	Green	Others	Lead
5 May 2022	2022 Scottish local elections	–	34.1%	19.7%	21.7%	8.6%	6.0%	16%	12.4%

== Councils ==
Council	Outgoing		2027		Article
Council	Largest party	Control	Largest party	Control	Article
Aberdeen City	SNP	SNP + Lib Dem coalition			
Aberdeenshire	Conservative	Con, Lib Dem + Ind coalition			
Angus	SNP	Con, Ind + Lab coalition			
Argyll and Bute	SNP	SNP, Lib Dem + Ind coalition			
Clackmannanshire	SNP	SNP minority			
Dumfries and Galloway	SNP	SNP minority			
Dundee City	SNP	SNP majority			
East Ayrshire	SNP	SNP minority			
East Dunbartonshire	SNP	SNP minority			
East Lothian	Labour	Labour minority			
East Renfrewshire	SNP, Lab, Con	Lab + Ind coalition			
City of Edinburgh	SNP	Labour minority			
Falkirk	SNP	SNP minority			
Fife	SNP	Labour minority			
Glasgow City	SNP	SNP minority			
Highland	Independent	SNP + Ind coalition			
Inverclyde	Labour	Labour minority			
Midlothian	SNP	SNP minority			
Moray	Conservative	Conservative minority			
Na h-Eileanan Siar	Independent	Independent majority			
North Ayrshire	SNP	SNP minority			
North Lanarkshire	Labour	Labour minority			
Orkney Islands	Independent	Independent majority			
Perth and Kinross	SNP	SNP minority			
Renfrewshire	SNP	SNP minority			
Scottish Borders	Conservative	Con + Ind coalition			
Shetland Islands	Independent	Independent majority			
South Ayrshire	Independent	Independent minority			
South Lanarkshire	SNP, Lab	Labour minority			
Stirling	SNP	SNP, Grn + Ind coalition			
West Dunbartonshire	Labour	Labour minority			
West Lothian	SNP	Labour minority			

== See also ==
- 2027 Northern Ireland Assembly Elections
- 2027 United Kingdom local elections
- 2027 Welsh local elections
- Politics of Scotland
