= 2026 Welsh Liberal Democrats leadership election =

- 23 October – 16 November 2026
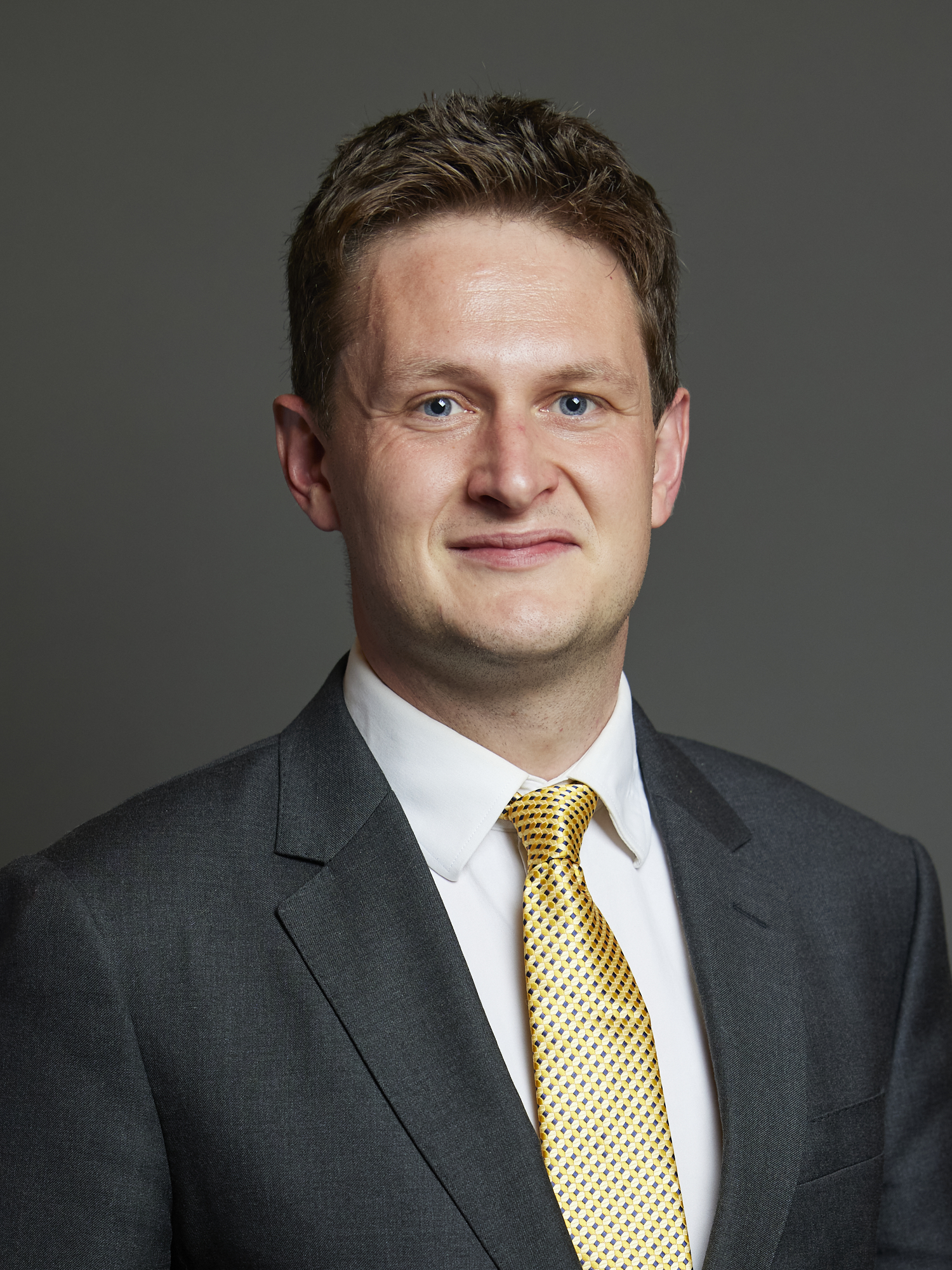
| Candidate | David Chadwick |
| Popular vote | Unopposed |
Leader before election
Jane Dodds
Elected Leader
David Chadwick

The 2026 Welsh Liberal Democrats leadership election was called due to leader Jane Dodds announcing her resignation on 20 October 2026. Nominations for leader opened on 23 October 2026 and closed on 16 November.

David Chadwick, MP for Brecon, Radnor and Cwm Tawe since 2024, was the party's only other elected representative eligible to stand. He announced his candidacy on 27 October 2026 and was elected unopposed at the close of nominations on 16 November 2026.

== Candidates ==
- David Chadwick, Member of Parliament for Brecon, Radnor and Cwm Tawe since 2024.

Chadwick was the only person eligible to stand and therefore elected at close of nominations.
