= Brecon, Radnor and Cwm Tawe =

UK Parliament constituency (since 2024)

- constituency for the House of Commons
- Interactive map of the constituency.
- Location of the constituency within Wales
- Electorate: 72,113 (March 2020)
- Major settlements: Brecon, Builth Wells, Llandrindod Wells, Pontardawe, Ystradgynlais.

Current constituency
- Created: 2024
- Member of Parliament: David Chadwick (Liberal Democrats)
- Seats: One
- Created from: Brecon and Radnorshire, Neath.

Overlaps
- Senedd: Brycheiniog Tawe Nedd

Brecon, Radnor and Cwm Tawe (Welsh: Aberhonddu, Maesyfed a Chwm Tawe) is a constituency of the House of Commons in the UK Parliament, first contested at the 2024 general election, following the 2023 review of Westminster constituencies. The current MP is David Chadwick of the Liberal Democrats.

The constituency name refers to the historic counties of Breconshire and Radnorshire as well as the Swansea Valley, known as Cwm Tawe [kʊm ˈtau̯.ɛ] in Welsh.

== Boundaries ==
The seat covers the large rural areas of the historic counties of Brecknockshire and Radnorshire (currently administered as part of the unitary authority of Powys) which had previously formed the abolished Brecon and Radnorshire constituency, as well as the town of Pontardawe in Neath Port Talbot County Borough which had previously been part of the abolished Neath constituency.

Under the 2023 review, the constituency was defined as being composed of the following, as they existed on 1 December 2020:

- The County Borough of Neath Port Talbot wards of: Allt-wen, Cwmllynfell, Godre’r Graig, Gwaun-Cae-Gurwen, Lower Brynamman, Pontardawe, Rhos, Trebanos, and Ystalyfera.
- The County of Powys wards of: Aber-craf, Beguildy, Bronllys, Builth, Bwlch, Crickhowell, Cwm-twrch, Disserth and Trecoed, Felin-fâch, Glasbury, Gwernyfed, Hay, Knighton, Llanafanfawr, Llanbadarn Fawr, Llandrindod East/Llandrindod West, Llandrindod North, Llandrindod South, Llanelwedd, Llangattock, Llangors, Llangunllo, Llangynidr, Llanwrtyd Wells, Llanyre, Maescar/Llywel, Nantmel, Old Radnor, Presteigne, Rhayader, St. David Within, St. John, St. Mary, Talgarth, Talybont-on-Usk, Tawe-Uchaf, Ynyscedwyn, Yscir, and Ystradgynlais.

Following local government boundary reviews which came into effect in May 2022, the constituency now comprises the following from the 2024 general election:

- The County Borough of Neath Port Talbot wards of: Allt-wen, Cwmllynfell and Ystalyfera, Godre’r Graig, Gwaun-Cae-Gurwen and Lower Brynamman, Pontardawe, Rhos, and Trebanos.
- The County of Powys wards of: Aber-craf and Ystradgynlais, Brecon East, Brecon West, Bronllys and Felin-fâch, Builth, Crickhowell with Cwmdu and Tretower, Cwm-twrch, Disserth and Trecoed with Newbridge, Glasbury, Gwernyfed, Hay, Ithon Valley, Knighton with Beguildy, Llanafanfawr with Garth, Llandrindod North, Llandrindod South, Llanelwedd, Llangattock and Llangynidr, Llangors with Bwlch, Llangunllo with Norton, Llanwrtyd Wells, Llanyre with Nantmel, Maescar and Llywel, Old Radnor, Presteigne, Rhayader, Talgarth, Talybont-on-Usk, Tawe-Uchaf, Ynyscedwyn, and Yscir with Honddu Isaf and Llanddew.

== Members of Parliament ==
| Election | Member | Party |
|---|---|---|
| 2024 | David Chadwick | Liberal Democrats |

== Elections ==
=== Elections in the 2020s ===
General election 2024: Brecon, Radnor and Cwm Tawe
| Party | Candidate | Votes | % | ±% |
|---|---|---|---|---|
| Liberal Democrats | David Chadwick | 13,736 | 29.5 | +0.3 |
| Conservative | Fay Jones | 12,264 | 26.3 | −20.3 |
| Labour | Matthew Dorrance | 9,904 | 21.3 | +3.8 |
| Reform | Adam Hill | 6,567 | 14.1 | +12.3 |
| Plaid Cymru | Emily Durrant-Munro | 2,280 | 4.9 | +1.7 |
| Green | Amerjit Rosie Kaur-Dhaliwal | 1,188 | 2.6 | +2.2 |
| Abolish | Jonathan Harrington | 372 | 0.8 | N/A |
| Monster Raving Loony | Lady Lily the Pink | 237 | 0.5 | −0.2 |
| Majority | | 1,472 | 3.2 | N/A |
| Turnout | | 46,548 | 63.7 | −8.8 |
| Registered electors | | 73,114 | | |
| Liberal Democrats gain from Conservative | | Swing | +10.3 | |

=== Elections in the 2010s ===
2019 notional result (Note: Estimate of the 2019 general election result as if the revised boundaries recommended under the 2023 boundary review were in place)
| Party | Vote | % |
|---|---|---|
| Conservative | 24,368 | 46.6 |
| Liberal Democrats | 15,277 | 29.2 |
| Labour | 9,164 | 17.5 |
| Plaid Cymru | 1,692 | 3.2 |
| Brexit Party | 964 | 1.8 |
| Other (2) | 590 | 1.1 |
| Green Party | 221 | 0.4 |
| Majority | 9,091 | 17.4 |
| Turnout | 52,276 | 72.5 |
| Electorate | 72,113 | |
