= David Chadwick (Liberal Democrat politician) =

British politician

David Chadwick MP
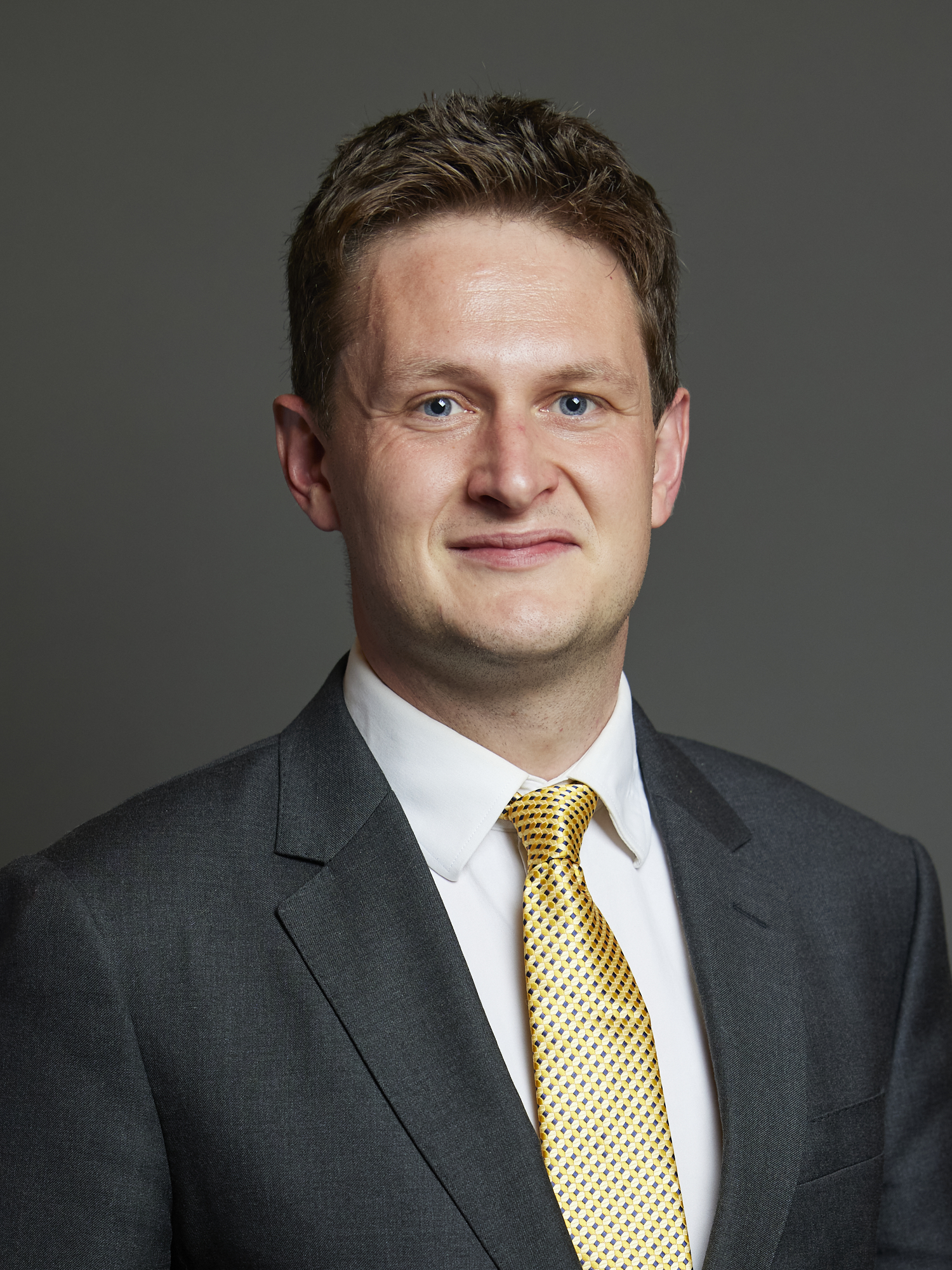
- Official portrait, 2024

Leader of the Welsh Liberal Democrats
- Incumbent
- Assumed office 16 November 2026
- Deputy: TBA
- Leader: Ed Davey
- Preceded by: Jane Dodds

Deputy Leader of the Welsh Liberal Democrats
- In office 18 September 2024 – 16 November 2026
- Preceded by: Christine Humphreys
- Succeeded by: TBA

Member of Parliament for Brecon, Radnor and Cwm Tawe
- Incumbent
- Assumed office 4 July 2024
- Preceded by: Constituency established
- Majority: 1,472 (3.2%)

Liberal Democrat spokesperson for Wales
- Incumbent
- Assumed office 18 September 2024
- Leader: Ed Davey
- Preceded by: Sarah Green

Personal details
- Born: David Wain Chadwick; 1991 or 1992 (age 34–35)’
- Party: Liberal Democrats
- Education: Leiden University (BA); St Cross College, Oxford (MPhil)

David Wain Chadwick (born 1991 or 1992) is a British politician who has served Leader of the Welsh Liberal Democrats since 2026. He has been Member of Parliament for Brecon, Radnor and Cwm Tawe since the 2024 general election.

Chadwick currently sits on the Westminster Liberal Democrat frontbench team as their Spokesman for Wales.

== Early life ==
Chadwick grew up in Gloucestershire, to a mother from Maesteg. At the age of 19 he was accepted into the Army Intelligence Corps, but had to drop out due to "over-training". He then went to study international studies at Leiden University.

In 2012, he was hit by a car, which split his leg in two, which took 3 months to recover from. When in 2014, he decided to move his studies to Argentina, he had yellow fever vaccination which triggered a rare condition called Guillain-Barré syndrome. This caused him to become "totally paralysed".

In 2017, Chadwick attended St Cross College, Oxford, where he studied a master's degree in European History.

== Political career ==
Chadwick contested North Dorset in the 2019 general election. He was selected to stand for Brecon, Radnor and Cwm Tawe in the 2024 general election in 2022. He won the seat with a majority of 1,472 votes, becoming the only Lib Dem MP in Wales.

Chadwick's political focuses are rural depopulation and agriculture.

On 18 September 2024, Ed Davey announced his new Frontbench Team. David Chadwick became Spokesperson for Wales within the team.

== Personal life ==
He lives in Brecon with his wife and two sons.

Parliament of the United Kingdom
New constituency	Member of Parliament for Brecon, Radnor and Cwm Tawe; 2024–present	Incumbent
