= List of statutory rules of Northern Ireland, 2009 =

This is an incomplete list of statutory rules of Northern Ireland in 2009.

== 1-100 ==
- The Beef and Veal Labelling Regulations (Northern Ireland) 2009 (S.R. 2009 No. 2)
- The Disabled Persons (Badges for Motor Vehicles) (Amendment) Regulations (Northern Ireland) 2009 (S.R. 2009 No. 6)
- The Rates (Social Sector Value) (Amendment) Regulations (Northern Ireland) 2009 (S.R. 2009 No. 7)
- The Conservation (Natural Habitats, etc.) (Amendment) Regulations (Northern Ireland) 2009 (S.R. 2009 No. 8)
- Rural Development (Financial Assistance) (Public Expenditure) Regulations (Northern Ireland) 2009 (S.R. 2009 No. 10)
- The Local Government (Constituting a Joint Committee) Order (Northern Ireland) 2009 (S.R. 2009 No. 11)
- The Motor Vehicles (Driving Licences) (Amendment) Regulations (Northern Ireland) 2009 (S.R. 2009 No. 14)
- General Ophthalmic Services (Amendment) Regulations (Northern Ireland) 2009 (S.R. 2009 No. 16)
- The Planning (Control of Advertisements) (Amendment) Regulations (Northern Ireland) 2009 (S.R. 2009 No. 17)
- The County Court (Amendment) Rules (Northern Ireland) 2009 (S.R. 2009 No. 19)
- The Special Educational Needs and Disability (General Qualifications Bodies) (Relevant Qualifications, Reasonable Steps and Physical Features) (Amendment) Regulations (Northern Ireland) 2009 (S.R. 2009 No. 20)
- The Pensions (2008 No. 2 Act) (Commencement No. 1) Order (Northern Ireland) 2009 (S.R. 2009 No. 22 (C. 1))
- The Feeding Stuffs (Amendment) Regulations (Northern Ireland) 2009 (S.R. 2009 No. 27)
- The Education (Student Loans) (Repayment) (Amendment) Regulations (Northern Ireland) 2009 (S.R. 2009 No. 29)
- The Potatoes Originating in Egypt (Amendment) Regulations (Northern Ireland) 2009 (S.R. 2009 No. 30)
- The Rates (Regional Rates) Order (Northern Ireland) 2009 (S.R. 2009 No. 31)
- Local Government Pension Scheme (Benefits, Membership and Contributions) Regulations (Northern Ireland) 2009 (S.R. 2009 No. 32)
- Local Government Pension Scheme (Administration) Regulations (Northern Ireland) 2009 (S.R. 2009 No. 33)
- Local Government Pension Scheme (Amendment and Transitional Provisions) Regulations (Northern Ireland) 2009 (S.R. 2009 No. 34)
- Energy (Amendment) Order (Northern Ireland) 2009 (S.R. 2009 No. 35)
- Police Support Staff (Suitability) Regulations (Northern Ireland) 2009 (S.R. 2009 No. 36)
- The Education (Student Support) Regulations (Northern Ireland) 2009 (S.R. 2009 No. 37)
- Safeguarding Vulnerable Groups (Transitory Provisions) Order (Northern Ireland) 2009 (S.R. 2009 No. 38)
- The Safeguarding Vulnerable Groups (Prescribed Criteria and Miscellaneous Provisions) Regulations (Northern Ireland) 2009 (S.R. 2009 No. 39)
- The Safeguarding Vulnerable Groups (Prescribed Information) Regulations (Northern Ireland) 2009 (S.R. 2009 No. 40)
- The Safeguarding Vulnerable Groups (2007 Order) (Commencement No. 3) Order (Northern Ireland) 2009 (S.R. 2009 No. 41 (C. 2))
- The Care Tribunal (Amendment) Regulations (Northern Ireland) 2009 (S.R. 2009 No. 42)
- The Employment Rights (Increase of Limits) Order (Northern Ireland) 2009 (S.R. 2009 No. 45)
- The Landfill Allowances Scheme (Amendment) Regulations (Northern Ireland) 2009 (S.R. 2009 No. 46)
- The Magistrates’ Courts (Amendment) Rules (Northern Ireland) 2009 (S.R. 2009 No. 47)
- The Travelling Expenses and Remission of Charges (Amendment) Regulations (Northern Ireland) 2009 (S.R. 2009 No. 52)
- The Plastic Materials and Articles in Contact with Food Regulations (Northern Ireland) 2009 (S.R. 2009 No. 56)
- The Rates (Amendment) Regulations (Northern Ireland) 2009 (S.R. 2009 No. 58)
- The Seed Potatoes (Crop Fees) Regulations (Northern Ireland) 2009 (S.R. 2009 No. 59)
- The Agriculture (Hardship Payment) Scheme (Northern Ireland) 2009 (S.R. 2009 No. 60)
- The Surface Waters (Shellfish) (Classification) (Amendment) Regulations (Northern Ireland) 2009 (S.R. 2009 No. 61)
- The Pensions (2005 Order) (Commencement No. 12) Order (Northern Ireland) 2009 (S.R. 2009 No. 62 (C. 3))
- The Bank Administration Rules (Northern Ireland) 2009 (S.R. 2009 No. 63)
- The Bank Insolvency Rules (Northern Ireland) 2009 (S.R. 2009 No. 64)
- The Health and Personal Social Services (Superannuation), Health and Social Care (Pension Scheme) and Health and Personal Social Services (Injury Benefits) (Amendment and Transitional Provisions) Regulations (Northern Ireland) 2009 (S.R. 2009 No. 65)
- Weights and Measures (Passing as Fit for Use for Trade and Adjustment Fees) Regulations (Northern Ireland) 2009 (S.R. 2009 No. 66)
- Measuring Instruments (EEC Requirements) (Verification Fees) Regulations (Northern Ireland) 2009 (S.R. 2009 No. 67)
- The Social Security (Habitual Residence) (Amendment) Regulations (Northern Ireland) 2009 (S.R. 2009 No. 68)
- Public Use of the Records (Management and Fees) Rules (Northern Ireland) 2009 (S.R. 2009 No. 69)
- The Household Fuel Payments Scheme Regulations (Northern Ireland) 2009 (S.R. 2009 No. 70)
- The Pre-release Access to Official Statistics Order (Northern Ireland) 2009 (S.R. 2009 No. 71)
- The Public Service Vehicles (Licence Fees) (Amendment) Regulations (Northern Ireland) 2009 (S.R. 2009 No. 72)
- The Motor Vehicles (Driving Licences) (Amendment) (Test Fees) Regulations (Northern Ireland) 2009 (S.R. 2009 No. 73)
- The Pneumoconiosis, etc., (Workers’ Compensation) (Payment of Claims) (Amendment) Regulations (Northern Ireland) 2009 (S.R. 2009 No. 74)
- The Pensions (2008 Act) (Commencement No. 2) Order (Northern Ireland) 2009 (S.R. 2009 No. 75 (C. 4))
- The Waste Management Licensing (Amendment) Regulations (Northern Ireland) 2009 (S.R. 2009 No. 76)
- The Rates (Maximum Capital Value) (Amendment) Regulations (Northern Ireland) 2009 (S.R. 2009 No. 77)
- The Pension Protection Fund (Miscellaneous Amendments) Regulations (Northern Ireland) 2009 (S.R. 2009 No. 78)
- THE POLICE PENSION (NORTHERN IRELAND) REGULATIONS 2009 (S.R. 2009 No. 79)
- The Guaranteed Minimum Pensions Increase Order (Northern Ireland) 2009 (S.R. 2009 No. 80)
- The Criminal Justice (Sentencing) (Licence Conditions) (Northern Ireland) Rules 2009 (S.R. 2009 No. 81)
- The Parole Commissioners’ Rules (Northern Ireland) 2009 (S.R. 2009 No. 82)
- Electronic Monitoring Requirements (Responsible Officer) Order (Northern Ireland) 2009 (S.R. 2009 No. 83)
- The Special Agencies (Consultation on Dissolution) Regulations (Northern Ireland) 2009 (S.R. 2009 No. 84)
- The Employer’s Liability (Compulsory Insurance) (Amendment) Regulations (Northern Ireland) 2009 (S.R. 2009 No. 85)
- The Animals and Animal Products (Import and Export) (Amendment) Regulations (Northern Ireland) 2009 (S.R. 2009 No. 86)
- The Healthy Start Scheme and Day Care Food Scheme (Amendment) Regulations (Northern Ireland) 2009 (S.R. 2009 No. 87)
- The Health and Personal Social Services (Assessment of Resources) (Amendment) Regulations (Northern Ireland) 2009 (S.R. 2009 No. 88)
- The Social Security Benefits Up-rating Order (Northern Ireland) 2009 (S.R. 2009 No. 89)
- The Social Security (National Insurance Number Information: Exemption) Regulations (Northern Ireland) 2009 (S.R. 2009 No. 90)
- The Community Drivers’ Hours and Recording Equipment (Exemptions and Supplementary Provisions) Regulations (Northern Ireland) 2009 (S.R. 2009 No. 91)
- The Social Security (Miscellaneous Amendments) Regulations (Northern Ireland) 2009 (S.R. 2009 No. 92)
- The Regional Agency for Public Health and Social Well-being (Membership) Regulations (Northern Ireland) 2009 (S.R. 2009 No. 93)
- The Northern Ireland Health Promotion Agency (Dissolution and Transfer of Staff, Assets and Liabilities) Order (Northern Ireland) 2009 (S.R. 2009 No. 94)
- The Regional Health and Social Care Board (Membership) Regulations (Northern Ireland) 2009 (S.R. 2009 No. 95)
- The Northern Ireland Regional Medical Physics Agency (Dissolution and Transfer of Staff, Assets and Liabilities) Order (Northern Ireland) 2009 (S.R. 2009 No. 96)
- The Regional Business Services Organisation (Membership and Procedure) Regulations (Northern Ireland) 2009 (S.R. 2009 No. 97)
- The Patient and Client Council (Membership and Procedure) Regulations (Northern Ireland) 2009 (S.R. 2009 No. 98)
- The Local Commissioning Groups (Number, Area and Functions) Regulations (Northern Ireland) 2009 (S.R. 2009 No. 99)
- The Social Security Benefits Up-rating Regulations (Northern Ireland) 2009 (S.R. 2009 No. 100)

== 101-200 ==
- The Social Security (Industrial Injuries) (Dependency) (Permitted Earnings Limits) Order (Northern Ireland) 2009 (S.R. 2009 No. 101)
- Legal Advice and Assistance (Amendment) Regulations (Northern Ireland) 2009 (S.R. 2009 No. 102)
- Legal Advice and Assistance (Financial Conditions) Regulations (Northern Ireland) 2009 (S.R. 2009 No. 103)
- Legal Aid (Financial Conditions) Regulations (Northern Ireland) 2009 (S.R. 2009 No. 104)
- The Social Security (Additional Class 3 National Insurance Contributions) (Amendment) Regulations (Northern Ireland) 2009 (S.R. 2009 No. 105)
- The Pensions Regulator (Miscellaneous Amendments) Regulations (Northern Ireland) 2009 (S.R. 2009 No. 106)
- The Social Security (Claims and Payments) (Amendment) Regulations (Northern Ireland) 2009 (S.R. 2009 No. 107)
- The Social Security (Transitional Payments) Regulations (Northern Ireland) 2009 (S.R. 2009 No. 108)
- Pensions Increase (Review) Order (Northern Ireland) 2009 (S.R. 2009 No. 109)
- The Social Security Pensions (Upper Accrual Point: Prescribed Equivalent) Regulations (Northern Ireland) 2009 (S.R. 2009 No. 110)
- The Social Security Pensions (Low Earnings Threshold) Order (Northern Ireland) 2009 (S.R. 2009 No. 111)
- The Social Security Revaluation of Earnings Factors Order (Northern Ireland) 2009 (S.R. 2009 No. 112)
- The Pensions (2008 Acts) (Consequential Provisions) Order (Northern Ireland) 2009 (S.R. 2009 No. 113)
- The Health and Social Care Reform (2009 Act) (Commencement) Order (Northern Ireland) 2009 (S.R. 2009 No. 114 (C. 5) (C . 5))
- The Occupational and Personal Pension Schemes (Miscellaneous Amendments) Regulations (Northern Ireland) 2009 (S.R. 2009 No. 115)
- Criminal Justice (Northern Ireland) Order 2008 (Commencement No.5 and Saving Provisions) Order 2009 (S.R. 2009 No. 120 (C. 6))
- The Recovery of Health Services Charges (General) and (Amounts) (Amendment) Regulations (Northern Ireland) 2009 (S.R. 2009 No. 121)
- The Bank Insolvency (No. 2) Rules (Northern Ireland) 2009 (S.R. 2009 No. 122)
- The Libraries (2008 Act) (Commencement No 2) Order (Northern Ireland) 2009 (S.R. 2009 No. 123 (C. 7))
- The Motor Hackney Carriages (Belfast) (Amendment) By-Laws (Northern Ireland) 2009 (S.R. 2009 No. 127)
- The Education (Student Loans) (Repayment) Regulations (Northern Ireland) 2009 (S.R. 2009 No. 128)
- The Aquatic Animal Health Regulations (Northern Ireland) 2009 (S.R. 2009 No. 129)
- The Products of Animal Origin (Third Country Imports) (Amendment) Regulations (Northern Ireland) 2009 (S.R. 2009 No. 130)
- The Health and Safety (Fees) Regulations (Northern Ireland) 2009 (S.R. 2009 No. 132)
- The Child Support and Social Security (Miscellaneous Amendments) Regulations (Northern Ireland) 2009 (S.R. 2009 No. 133)
- The Plant Health (Import Inspection Fees) (Amendment) Regulations (Northern Ireland) 2009 (S.R. 2009 No. 134)
- The Social Security (Incapacity Benefit) (Amendment) Regulations (Northern Ireland) 2009 (S.R. 2009 No. 135)
- The Charities (2008 Act) (Commencement No. 1) Order (Northern Ireland) 2009 (S.R. 2009 No. 138 (C. 8))
- The Occupational Pension Schemes (Levy Ceiling) Order (Northern Ireland) 2009 (S.R. 2009 No. 139)
- The Pension Protection Fund (Pension Compensation Cap) Order (Northern Ireland) 2009 (S.R. 2009 No. 140)
- The Social Security (Steps to Work) Regulations (Northern Ireland) 2009 (S.R. 2009 No. 141)
- The Police and Criminal Evidence (Application to the Police Ombudsman) Order (Northern Ireland) 2009 (S.R. 2009 No. 142)
- The Police Service of Northern Ireland (Pensions) (Amendment) Regulations 2009 (S.R. 2009 No. 143)
- The Health and Social Care (Reform) (2009 Act) (Consequential Provisions) Order (Northern Ireland) 2009 (S.R. 2009 No. 144)
- The Establishments and Agencies (Fitness of Workers) (Amendment No. 2) Regulations (Northern Ireland) 2009 (S.R. 2009 No. 145)
- The Health and Social Care (Reform) (2009 Act) (Transitional Provisions) Order (Northern Ireland) 2009 (S.R. 2009 No. 146)
- The Pensions (2008 No. 2 Act) (Commencement No. 2) Order (Northern Ireland) 2009 (S.R. 2009 No. 147 (C. 9))
- The Occupational Pension Schemes (Contracting-out) (Amendment) Regulations (Northern Ireland) 2009 (S.R. 2009 No. 149)
- Superannuation (Health and Social Care Bodies) Order (Northern Ireland) 2009 (S.R. 2009 No. 150)
- The Travelling Expenses and Remission of Charges (Amendment No. 2) Regulations (Northern Ireland) 2009 (S.R. 2009 No. 151)
- The General Ophthalmic Services (Amendment No. 2) Regulations (Northern Ireland) 2009 (S.R. 2009 No. 152)
- The Optical Charges and Payments (Amendment) Regulations (Northern Ireland) 2009 (S.R. 2009 No. 153)
- The Renewables Obligation Order (Northern Ireland) 2009 (S.R. 2009 No. 154)
- The Waste Batteries and Accumulators (Charges) Regulations (Northern Ireland) 2009 (S.R. 2009 No. 157)
- Criminal Justice (Northern Ireland) Order 2008 (Consequential Provision) Order 2009 (S.R. 2009 No. 158)
- The Waste Batteries and Accumulators (Treatment and Disposal) Regulations (Northern Ireland) 2009 (S.R. 2009 No. 159)
- The Allocation of Housing and Homelessness (Eligibility) (Amendment) Regulations (Northern Ireland) 2009 (S.R. 2009 No. 161)
- The Pharmaceutical Society of Northern Ireland (General) (Amendment) Regulations (Northern Ireland) 2009 (S.R. 2009 No. 166)
- The Purity Criteria for Colours, Sweeteners and Miscellaneous Food Additives Regulations (Northern Ireland) 2009 (S.R. 2009 No. 167)
- The Environmental Protection (Restriction on Use of Lead Shot) Regulations (Northern Ireland) 2009 (S.R. 2009 No. 168)
- The Criminal Damage (Compensation) (Amendment) (Northern Ireland) Order 2009 (Commencement) Order 2009 (S.R. 2009 No. 169 (C. 10))
- The Public Authorities (Reform) (2009 Act) (Commencement No.1) Order (Northern Ireland) 2009 (S.R. 2009 No. 172 (C. 11))
- Rehabilitation of Offenders (Exceptions) (Amendment) Order (Northern Ireland) 2009 (S.R. 2009 No. 173)
- The Whole of Government Accounts (Designation of Bodies) Order (Northern Ireland) 2009 (S.R. 2009 No. 174)
- The County Court (Amendment No. 2) Rules (Northern Ireland) 2009 (S.R. 2009 No. 176)
- The Sea Fish Industry (Harbour, Landing and Light Dues) Scheme (Northern Ireland) 2009 (S.R. 2009 No. 177)
- The Waste Management Strategy Regulations (Northern Ireland) 2009 (S.R. 2009 No. 178)
- The Plant Health (Amendment) Order (Northern Ireland) 2009 (S.R. 2009 No. 179)
- The Education (1998 Order) (Commencement No.6) Order (Northern Ireland) 2009 (S.R. 2009 No. 183 (C. 12))
- The Fluorinated Greenhouse Gases Regulations (Northern Ireland) 2009 (S.R. 2009 No. 184)
- The Charges for Drugs and Appliances and Provision of Health Services to Persons not Ordinarily Resident (Amendment) Regulations (Northern Ireland) 2009 (S.R. 2009 No. 186)
- The Taxis (Ballymena) Bye-Laws (Northern Ireland) 2009 (S.R. 2009 No. 187)
- The Health and Personal Social Services (Superannuation Scheme and Injury Benefits) and Health and Social Care (Pension Scheme) (Amendment) Regulations (Northern Ireland) 2009 (S.R. 2009 No. 188)
- Pharmaceutical Services and Charges for Drugs and Appliances (Amendment) Regulations (Northern Ireland) 2009 (S.R. 2009 No. 191)
- The Health and Safety Information for Employees (Amendment) Regulations (Northern Ireland) 2009 (S.R. 2009 No. 192)
- The Domestic Energy Efficiency Grants Regulations (Northern Ireland) 2009 (S.R. 2009 No. 195)
- The Ardnavalley Park, Comber (Abandonment) Order (Northern Ireland) 2009 (S.R. 2009 No. 197)
- The Ballycloughan Road (U214), Saintfield (Abandonment) Order (Northern Ireland) 2009 (S.R. 2009 No. 198)

== 201-300 ==
- The Insolvency (Fees) (Amendment) Order (Northern Ireland) 2009 (S.R. 2009 No. 201)
- The Insolvency (Amendment) Regulations (Northern Ireland) 2009 (S.R. 2009 No. 202)
- The Insolvency (Deposits) (Amendment) Order (Northern Ireland) 2009 (S.R. 2009 No. 203)
- The Insolvency Practitioners and Insolvency Account (Fees) (Amendment) Order (Northern Ireland) 2009 (S.R. 2009 No. 204)
- The Control of Salmonella in Broiler Flocks Scheme Order (Northern Ireland) 2009 (S.R. 2009 No. 205)
- The Less Favoured Area Compensatory Allowances (Amendment) Regulations (Northern Ireland) 2009 (S.R. 2009 No. 206)
- The Rules of the Supreme Court (Northern Ireland) (Amendment) 2009 (S.R. 2009 No. 207)
- The Criminal Appeal (Serious Crime Prevention Orders) Rules (Northern Ireland) 2009 (S.R. 2009 No. 208)
- The Criminal Appeal (Offenders Assisting Investigations and Prosecutions) (Amendment) Rules (Northern Ireland) 2009 (S.R. 2009 No. 209)
- The Safeguarding Vulnerable Groups (Prescribed Criteria) (Foreign Offences) Order (Northern Ireland) 2009 (S.R. 2009 No. 21)
- The Criminal Appeal (Amendment) (Northern Ireland) Rules 2009 (S.R. 2009 No. 210)
- The Further Education (Student Support) (Eligibility) Regulations (Northern Ireland) 2009 (S.R. 2009 No. 211)
- Electricity and Gas (Billing) Regulations (Northern Ireland) 2009 (S.R. 2009 No. 215)
- The Child Maintenance (2008 Act) (Commencement No. 6) Order (Northern Ireland) 2009 (S.R. 2009 No. 216 (C. 13))
- The Glen Road, Londonderry (Abandonment) Order (Northern Ireland) 2009 (S.R. 2009 No. 217)
- The Frances Street, Newtownards (Footway) (Abandonment) Order (Northern Ireland) 2009 (S.R. 2009 No. 218)
- The Newforge Road, Magheralin (Footway) (Abandonment) Order (Northern Ireland) 2009 (S.R. 2009 No. 219)
- The Contaminants in Food Regulations (Northern Ireland) 2009 (S.R. 2009 No. 220)
- The Traffic Signs (Amendment) Regulations (Northern Ireland) 2009 (S.R. 2009 No. 221)
- The Railways Infrastructure (Access, Management and Licensing of Railway Undertakings) (Amendment) Regulations (Northern Ireland) 2009 (S.R. 2009 No. 222)
- The Swine Vesicular Disease Regulations (Northern Ireland) 2009 (S.R. 2009 No. 223)
- The Controlled Drugs (Supervision of Management and Use) Regulations (Northern Ireland) 2009 (S.R. 2009 No. 225)
- The Foyle Area and Carlingford Area (Licensing of Fishing Engines) (Amendment) Regulations 2009 (S.R. 2009 No. 226)
- The Health and Safety (Miscellaneous Amendments and Revocation) Regulations (Northern Ireland) 2009 (S.R. 2009 No. 227)
- The Social Security (Industrial Injuries) (Prescribed Diseases) (Amendment) Regulations (Northern Ireland) 2009 (S.R. 2009 No. 228)
- The Products of Animal Origin (Disease Control) (Amendment) Regulations (Northern Ireland) 2009 (S.R. 2009 No. 229)
- The Rules of the Supreme Court (Northern Ireland) (Amendment No. 2) 2009 (S.R. 2009 No. 230)
- The Education (Pupil Reporting) Regulations (Northern Ireland) 2009 (S.R. 2009 No. 231)
- The Court Funds (Amendment) Rules (Northern Ireland) 2009 (S.R. 2009 No. 232)
- The Social Fund Winter Fuel Payment (Temporary Increase) Regulations (Northern Ireland) 2009 (S.R. 2009 No. 233)
- The Chemicals (Hazard Information and Packaging for Supply) Regulations (Northern Ireland) 2009 (S.R. 2009 No. 238)
- The Social Security (Recovery of Benefits) (Lump Sum Payments) (Amendment) Regulations (Northern Ireland) 2009 (S.R. 2009 No. 239)
- The Social Security (Miscellaneous Amendments No. 2) Regulations (Northern Ireland) 2009 (S.R. 2009 No. 240)
- Valuation for Rating (Decapitalisation Rate) Regulations (Northern Ireland) 2009 (S.R. 2009 No. 241)
- The Pensions (2005 Order) (Commencement No. 13) Order (Northern Ireland) 2009 (S.R. 2009 No. 242 (C. 14))
- Criminal Justice and Immigration (2008 Act) (Commencement No. 1) Order (Northern Ireland) 2009 (S.R. 2009 No. 243 (C. 15))
- The Pension Protection Fund (Entry Rules) (Amendment) Regulations (Northern Ireland) 2009 (S.R. 2009 No. 245)
- Water Supply (Water Quality) (Amendment) Regulations (Northern Ireland) 2009 (S.R. 2009 No. 246)
- The Meat (Official Controls Charges) Regulations (Northern Ireland) 2009 (S.R. 2009 No. 247)
- The Manufacture and Storage of Explosives (Amendment) Regulations (Northern Ireland) 2009 (S.R. 2009 No. 248)
- The Pensions (2008 No. 2 Act) (Commencement No. 3) Order (Northern Ireland) 2009 (S.R. 2009 No. 249 (C. 16))
- The Pensions (2005 Order) (Code of Practice) (Material Detriment Test) (Appointed Day) Order (Northern Ireland) 2009 (S.R. 2009 No. 250)
- The Horses (Zootechnical Standards) Regulations (Northern Ireland) 2009 (S.R. 2009 No. 251)
- The Environmental Liability (Prevention and Remediation) Regulations (Northern Ireland) 2009 (S.R. 2009 No. 252)
- Lands Tribunal (Salaries) Order (Northern Ireland) 2009 (S.R. 2009 No. 253)
- Groundwater Regulations (Northern Ireland) 2009 (S.R. 2009 No. 254)
- The Water Supply (Water Fittings) Regulations (Northern Ireland) 2009 (S.R. 2009 No. 255)
- The Planning (Fees) (Amendment) Regulations (Northern Ireland) 2009 (S.R. 2009 No. 256)
- The Smoke Control Areas (Exempted Fireplaces) (Amendment) Regulations (Northern Ireland) 2009 (S.R. 2009 No. 257)
- The Food Irradiation Regulations (Northern Ireland) 2009 (S.R. 2009 No. 258)
- The Natural Mineral Water, Spring Water and Bottled Drinking Water (Amendment) Regulations (Northern Ireland) 2009 (S.R. 2009 No. 260)
- The Social Security (Students and Miscellaneous Amendments) Regulations (Northern Ireland) 2009 (S.R. 2009 No. 261)
- The Social Security (Deemed Income from Capital) Regulations (Northern Ireland) 2009 (S.R. 2009 No. 262)
- General Dental Services (Amendment) Regulations (Northern Ireland) 2009 (S.R. 2009 No. 263)
- The Rules of the Supreme Court (Northern Ireland) (Amendment No.3) 2009 (S.R. 2009 No. 264)
- Sexual Offences (Northern Ireland) Order 2008 (Transitional Provisions) Order 2009 (S.R. 2009 No. 265)
- The Working Time (Amendment) Regulations (Northern Ireland) 2009 (S.R. 2009 No. 266)
- The Legal Aid for Crown Court Proceedings (Costs) (Amendment) Rules (Northern Ireland) 2009 (S.R. 2009 No. 267)
- The Tullynacross Road, Lisburn (Footway) (Abandonment) Order (Northern Ireland) 2009 (S.R. 2009 No. 269)
- The Industrial Training Levy (Construction Industry) Order (Northern Ireland) 2009 (S.R. 2009 No. 271)
- The Building Regulations (2009 Amendment Act) (Commencement) Order (Northern Ireland) 2009 (S.R. 2009 No. 272 (C. 17))
- The Explosives (Hazard Information and Packaging for Supply) Regulations (Northern Ireland) 2009 (S.R. 2009 No. 273)
- The Motor Hackney Carriages (Belfast) (Amendment No. 2) By-Laws (Northern Ireland) 2009 (S.R. 2009 No. 274)
- The Criminal Evidence (Northern Ireland) Order 1999 (Commencement No. 6) Order 2009 (S.R. 2009 No. 275 (C. 18))
- The Housing Benefit (Child Benefit Disregard and Child Care Charges) Regulations (Northern Ireland) 2009 (S.R. 2009 No. 276)
- The Main Street, Castledawson (Footway) (Abandonment) Order (Northern Ireland) 2009 (S.R. 2009 No. 277)
- The Clifton Street and Glenravel Street, Belfast (Footpath) (Abandonment) Order (Northern Ireland) 2009 (S.R. 2009 No. 278)
- The Establishments and Agencies (Fitness of Workers) (Amendment) Regulations (Northern Ireland) 2009 (S.R. 2009 No. 28)
- The Child Support (Miscellaneous Amendments) Regulations (Northern Ireland) 2009 (S.R. 2009 No. 286)
- The Safety of Sports Grounds (2006 Order) (Commencement) Order (Northern Ireland) 2009 (S.R. 2009 No. 287 (C. 19))
- The Safety of Sports Grounds (Designation) Order (Northern Ireland) 2009 (S.R. 2009 No. 288)
- The Safety of Sports Grounds (Fees and Appeals) Regulations (Northern Ireland) 2009 (S.R. 2009 No. 289)
- The Glencam Road, Omagh (Abandonment) Order (Northern Ireland) 2009 (S.R. 2009 No. 291)
- The Street Works (Inspection Fees) (Amendment) Regulations (Northern Ireland) 2009 (S.R. 2009 No. 292)
- The Pensions Regulator (Delegation of Powers) Regulations (Northern Ireland) 2009 (S.R. 2009 No. 294)
- The Safety of Sports Grounds (Designation) (No. 2) Order (Northern Ireland) 2009 (S.R. 2009 No. 295)
- The Health and Safety at Work Order (Application to Environmentally Hazardous Substances) (Amendment) Regulations (Northern Ireland) 2009 (S.R. 2009 No. 296)
- The Steps to Work (Miscellaneous Provisions) Order (Northern Ireland) 2009 (S.R. 2009 No. 297)
- Animals and Animal Products (Examination for Residues and Maximum Residue Limits) (Amendment) Regulations (Northern Ireland) 2009 (S.R. 2009 No. 298)
- The Barbour Gardens and Kingsway, Dunmurry (Abandonment) Order (Northern Ireland) 2009 (S.R. 2009 No. 300)

== 301-400 ==
- The T6 Land Frontier-Aughnacloy-Ballygawley-Enniskillen-Belcoo-Land Frontier Trunk Road Order (Northern Ireland) 2009 (S.R. 2009 No. 301)
- The Motor Vehicles (Exchangeable Licences) Order (Northern Ireland) 2009 (S.R. 2009 No. 302)
- Rehabilitation of Offenders (Exceptions) (Amendment) (No. 2) Order (Northern Ireland) 2009 (S.R. 2009 No. 303)
- Safeguarding Vulnerable Groups (Regulated Activity, Transitional Provisions and Commencement No. 4) Order (Northern Ireland) 2009 (S.R. 2009 No. 304 (C. 20))
- The Safeguarding Vulnerable Groups (Miscellaneous Provisions) Order (Northern Ireland) 2009 (S.R. 2009 No. 305)
- The Safeguarding Vulnerable Groups (Miscellaneous Provisions) Regulations (Northern Ireland) 2009 (S.R. 2009 No. 306)
- The Magistrates’ Courts (Amendment No. 2) Rules (Northern Ireland) 2009 (S.R. 2009 No. 310)
- The Magistrates’ Courts (Criminal Justice (Children))(Amendment) Rules (Northern Ireland) 2009 (S.R. 2009 No. 311)
- The Access to Justice (Northern Ireland) Order 2003 (Commencement No. 6) Order (Northern Ireland) 2009 (S.R. 2009 No. 312 (C. 21))
- The Magistrates’ Courts and County Court Appeals (Criminal Legal Aid) (Costs) Rules (Northern Ireland) 2009 (S.R. 2009 No. 313)
- The Legal Aid in Criminal Proceedings (Costs) (Amendment) Rules (Northern Ireland) 2009 (S.R. 2009 No. 314)
- European Economic Interest Grouping (Fees) (Revocation) Regulations (Northern Ireland) 2009 (S.R. 2009 No. 315)
- The Common Agricultural Policy Single Payment and Support Schemes (Cross Compliance) (Amendment) Regulations (Northern Ireland) 2009 (S.R. 2009 No. 316)
- The Work and Families (Increase of Maximum Amount) Order (Northern Ireland) 2009 (S.R. 2009 No. 317)
- The Social Security (Miscellaneous Amendments No. 3) Regulations (Northern Ireland) 2009 (S.R. 2009 No. 318)
- Pharmaceutical Services (Amendment) Regulations (Northern Ireland) 2009 (S.R. 2009 No. 320)
- Agriculture (Student fees)(Amendment) Regulations (Northern Ireland) 2009 (S.R. 2009 No. 321)
- The Taxis (Coleraine, Portstewart and Portrush) (Amendment) Bye-Laws (Northern Ireland) 2009 (S.R. 2009 No. 322)
- The Products of Animal Origin (Third Country Imports) (Amendment) (No.2) Regulations (Northern Ireland) 2009 (S.R. 2009 No. 323)
- The Charities (2008 Act) (Commencement No. 2) Order (Northern Ireland) 2009 (S.R. 2009 No. 324 (C. 22))
- Registered Rents (Increase) Order (Northern Ireland) 2009 (S.R. 2009 No. 325)
- The Zoonoses and Animal By-Products (Fees) (Amendment) Regulations (Northern Ireland) 2009 (S.R. 2009 No. 326)
- The Social Security (Incapacity Benefit Work-focused Interviews) (Amendment) Regulations (Northern Ireland) 2009 (S.R. 2009 No. 327)
- The Housing Benefit (Executive Determinations) (Amendment) Regulations (Northern Ireland) 2009 (S.R. 2009 No. 328)
- The Travelling Expenses and Remission of Charges (Amendment No.3) Regulations (Northern Ireland) 2009 (S.R. 2009 No. 329)
- The Rathgael Road, Bangor (Abandonment) Order (Northern Ireland) 2009 (S.R. 2009 No. 330)
- The Food Labelling (Nutrition Information) Regulations (Northern Ireland) 2009 (S.R. 2009 No. 331)
- The Salaries (Assembly Ombudsman and Commissioner for Complaints) Order (Northern Ireland) 2009 (S.R. 2009 No. 335)
- The Motor Vehicles (Construction and Use) (Amendment) Regulations (Northern Ireland) 2009 (S.R. 2009 No. 336)
- Police and Criminal Evidence (Amendment) (Northern Ireland) Order 2007 (Commencement) Order 2009 (S.R. 2009 No. 337 (C. 23))
- The Social Security (Miscellaneous Amendments No. 4) Regulations (Northern Ireland) 2009 (S.R. 2009 No. 338)
- The Rate Relief (Amendment) Regulations (Northern Ireland) 2009 (S.R. 2009 No. 339)
- The Plant Health (Wood and Bark) (Amendment) Order (Northern Ireland) 2009 (S.R. 2009 No. 340)
- The Social Security (Steps to Work) (No. 2) Regulations (Northern Ireland) 2009 (S.R. 2009 No. 341)
- The Social Fund (Cold Weather Payments) (General) (Amendment) Regulations (Northern Ireland) 2009 (S.R. 2009 No. 342)
- The Public Service Vehicles (Conditions of Fitness, Equipment and Use) (Amendment) Regulations (Northern Ireland) 2009 (S.R. 2009 No. 343)
- The Motor Vehicles (Driving Licences) (Fees) (Amendment) Regulations (Northern Ireland) 2009 (S.R. 2009 No. 344)
- The Rules of the Court of Judicature (Northern Ireland) (Amendment No. 4) 2009 (S.R. 2009 No. 345)
- Safeguarding Vulnerable Groups (2007 Order) (Commencement No. 5, Transitional Provisions and Savings) Order (Northern Ireland) 2009 (S.R. 2009 No. 346 (C. 24))
- The Transmissible Spongiform Encephalopathies (Amendment) Regulations (Northern Ireland) 2009 (S.R. 2009 No. 347)
- The Feed (Specified Undesirable Substances) Regulations (Northern Ireland) 2009 (S.R. 2009 No. 348)
- The Rate Relief (Education, Training and Leaving Care) (Revocation and Savings) Regulations (Northern Ireland) 2009 (S.R. 2009 No. 349)
- The Larchwood Avenue, Banbridge (Abandonment) Order (Northern Ireland) 2009 (S.R. 2009 No. 351)
- The Taxis (2008 Act) (Commencement No. 1 and Transitory Provision) Order (Northern Ireland) 2009 (S.R. 2009 No. 352 (C. 25))
- Game Preservation (Special Protection for Irish Hares) Order (Northern Ireland) 2009 (S.R. 2009 No. 353)
- The Wine Regulations (Northern Ireland) 2009 (S.R. 2009 No. 354)
- The Redpoll Avenue Bus Turning Circle, Lisburn (Abandonment) Order (Northern Ireland) 2009 (S.R. 2009 No. 355)
- The Presumption of Death (2009 Act) (Commencement) Order (Northern Ireland) 2009 (S.R. 2009 No. 356 (C. 26))
- The Public Service Vehicles (Conditions of Fitness, Equipment and Use) (Amendment No. 2) Regulations (Northern Ireland) 2009 (S.R. 2009 No. 358)
- Groundwater (Amendment) Regulations (Northern Ireland) 2009 (S.R. 2009 No. 359)
- The Nitrates Action Programme (Amendment) Regulations (Northern Ireland) 2009 (S.R. 2009 No. 360)
- The Environmental Liability (Prevention and Remediation) (Amendment) Regulations (Northern Ireland) 2009 (S.R. 2009 No. 361)
- The Food Labelling (Declaration of Allergens) Regulations (Northern Ireland) 2009 (S.R. 2009 No. 362)
- The Child Support (Miscellaneous Amendments No. 2) Regulations (Northern Ireland) 2009 (S.R. 2009 No. 363)
- The Presumption of Death Regulations (Northern Ireland) 2009 (S.R. 2009 No. 364)
- The Occupational and Personal Pension Schemes (Authorised Payments) Regulations (Northern Ireland) 2009 (S.R. 2009 No. 365)
- The Further Education (Student Support) (Eligibility) (Amendment) Regulations (Northern Ireland) 2009 (S.R. 2009 No. 366)
- Categories of Tourist Establishment (Statutory Criteria) (Amendment) Regulations (Northern Ireland) 2009 (S.R. 2009 No. 367)
- The Energy Performance of Buildings (Certificates and Inspections) (Amendment) Regulations (Northern Ireland) 2009 (S.R. 2009 No. 369)
- The Education (General Teaching Council for Northern Ireland) (Miscellaneous Amendments) Regulations (Northern Ireland) 2009 (S.R. 2009 No. 370)
- The Education (Student Support) (No. 2) Regulations (Northern Ireland) 2009 (S.R. 2009 No. 373)
- The Pensions (2005 Order) (Code of Practice) (Trustee Knowledge and Understanding) (Appointed Day) Order (Northern Ireland) 2009 (S.R. 2009 No. 374)
- Rates (Amendment) (2009 Act) (Commencement No. 1) Order (Northern Ireland) 2009 (S.R. 2009 No. 375 (C. 27))
- The Water Environment (Floods Directive) Regulations (Northern Ireland) 2009 (S.R. 2009 No. 376)
- The Materials and Articles in Contact with Food (Amendment) Regulations (Northern Ireland) 2009 (S.R. 2009 No. 377)
- The Foyle Area and Carlingford Area (Coarse Angling) Regulations 2009 (S.R. 2009 No. 378)
- The Foyle Area and Carlingford Area (Conservation of Eels) Regulations 2009 (S.R. 2009 No. 379)
- The Child Maintenance (2008 Act) (Commencement No. 7) Order (Northern Ireland) 2009 (S.R. 2009 No. 380 (C. 28))
- The Foyle Area and Carlingford Area (Angling) (Amendment) Regulations 2009 (S.R. 2009 No. 381)
- The Housing Benefit (Miscellaneous Amendments) Regulations (Northern Ireland) 2009 (S.R. 2009 No. 382)
- The Cereal Seeds Regulations (Northern Ireland) 2009 (S.R. 2009 No. 383)
- The Beet Seeds Regulations (Northern Ireland) 2009 (S.R. 2009 No. 384)
- The Fodder Plant Seeds Regulations (Northern Ireland) 2009 (S.R. 2009 No. 385)
- The Oil and Fibre Plant Seeds Regulations (Northern Ireland) 2009 (S.R. 2009 No. 386)
- The Vegetable Seeds Regulations (Northern Ireland) 2009 (S.R. 2009 No. 387)
- The Seeds (Registration, Licensing and Enforcement) Regulations (Northern Ireland) 2009 (S.R. 2009 No. 388)
- The Misuse of Drugs (Designation) (Amendment) Order (Northern Ireland) 2009 (S.R. 2009 No. 389)
- The Misuse of Drugs (Amendment) Regulations (Northern Ireland) 2009 (S.R. 2009 No. 390)
- Police Reserve Trainee (Amendment) Regulations (Northern Ireland) 2009 (S.R. 2009 No. 391)
- The Social Fund (Applications and Miscellaneous Provisions) (Amendment) Regulations (Northern Ireland) 2009 (S.R. 2009 No. 392)
- Police Service of Northern Ireland Reserve (Part-Time) (Amendment) Regulations 2009 (S.R. 2009 No. 393)
- The Health and Personal Social Services (Prescribing and Charging Amendments Relating to Pandemic Influenza) Regulations (Northern Ireland) 2009 (S.R. 2009 No. 394)
- The Local Commissioning Groups (Membership) Regulations (Northern Ireland) 2009 (S.R. 2009 No. 395)
- The Dogs (Licensing and Identification) (Amendment) Regulations (Northern Ireland) 2009 (S.R. 2009 No. 396)
- The Misuse of Drugs (Amendment) (No.2) Regulations (Northern Ireland) 2009 (S.R. 2009 No. 397)
- The Food for Particular Nutritional Uses (Addition of Substances for Specific Nutritional Purposes) Regulations (Northern Ireland) 2009 (S.R. 2009 No. 398)
- The Planning (Control of Major-Accident Hazards) Regulations (Northern Ireland) 2009 (S.R. 2009 No. 399)
- The Student Fees (Amounts) (Amendment) Regulations (Northern Ireland) 2009 (S.R. 2009 No. 400)

== 401-500 ==
- The Provision of Services (Insolvency Practitioners) Regulations (Northern Ireland) 2009 (S.R. 2009 No. 401)
- The Insolvency Practitioners and Insolvency Account (Fees) (Amendment) (No. 2) Order (Northern Ireland) 2009 (S.R. 2009 No. 402)
- The Pollution Prevention and Control (Amendment) Regulations (Northern Ireland) 2009 (S.R. 2009 No. 403)
- The Insolvency (Amendment) Rules (Northern Ireland) 2009 (S.R. 2009 No. 404)
- The Fair Employment (Specification of Public Authorities) (Amendment) Order (Northern Ireland) 2009 (S.R. 2009 No. 405)
- The T8 Moira-Antrim-Magherafelt-Moneymore Trunk Road Order (Northern Ireland) 2009 (S.R. 2009 No. 406)
- The Food Supplements and the Addition of Vitamins, Minerals and Other Substances (Amendment) Regulations (Northern Ireland) 2009 (S.R. 2009 No. 407)
- The Occupational Pensions (Revaluation) Order (Northern Ireland) 2009 (S.R. 2009 No. 408)
- The Social Security (Miscellaneous Amendments No. 5) Regulations (Northern Ireland) 2009 (S.R. 2009 No. 409)
- The Race Relations Order (Amendment) Regulations (Northern Ireland) 2009 (S.R. 2009 No. 410)
- The Sheep and Goats (Records, Identification and Movement) Order (Northern Ireland) 2009 (S.R. 2009 No. 411)
- Gas (Supplier of Last Resort) Regulations (Northern Ireland) 2009 (S.R. 2009 No. 412)
- The Private Water Supplies Regulations (Northern Ireland) 2009 (S.R. 2009 No. 413)
- The Control of Asbestos (Amendment) Regulations (Northern Ireland) 2009 (S.R. 2009 No. 414)
- The Food Enzymes Regulations (Northern Ireland) 2009 (S.R. 2009 No. 415)
- The Food Additives Regulations (Northern Ireland) 2009 (S.R. 2009 No. 416)
- The Food (Jelly Mini-Cups) (Emergency Control) Regulations (Northern Ireland) 2009 (S.R. 2009 No. 417)
- The Income Support (Prescribed Categories of Person) Regulations (Northern Ireland) 2009 (S.R. 2009 No. 418)
- The Waiting Restrictions (Maghera) (Amendment) Order (Northern Ireland) 2009 (S.R. 2009 No. 419)
- The Waiting Restrictions (Randalstown) Order (Northern Ireland) 2009 (S.R. 2009 No. 420)
- The Charlestown Road, Portadown (Abandonment) Order (Northern Ireland) 2009 (S.R. 2009 No. 421)
- The Child Support (Management of Payments and Arrears) Regulations (Northern Ireland) 2009 (S.R. 2009 No. 422)
- The Plant Health (Import Inspection Fees) (Amendment No 2) Regulations (Northern Ireland) 2009 (S.R. 2009 No. 423)
- The Court of Judicature Fees (Amendment) Order (Northern Ireland) 2009 (S.R. 2009 No. 424)
- The Employment Equality (Age) (Amendment) Regulations (Northern Ireland) 2009 (S.R. 2009 No. 425)
- The Social Security (Housing Costs Special Arrangements) (Amendment) Regulations (Northern Ireland) 2009 (S.R. 2009 No. 426)
- The Official Feed and Food Controls Regulations (Northern Ireland) 2009 (S.R. 2009 No. 427)
- The Disability Discrimination (Transport Vehicles) Regulations (Northern Ireland) 2009 (S.R. 2009 No. 428)
- The Prison and Young Offenders Centre (Amendment) Rules (Northern Ireland) 2009 (S.R. 2009 No. 429)
