= List of statutory rules of Northern Ireland, 2012 =

This is an incomplete list of statutory rules of Northern Ireland in 2012.

== 1-100 ==
- The Occupational Pension Schemes (Employer Debt and Miscellaneous Amendments) Regulations (Northern Ireland) 2012 (S.R. 2012 No. 1)
- The Official Statistics Order (Northern Ireland) 2012 (S.R. 2012 No. 2)
- The Specified Products from China (Restriction on First Placing on the Market) (Amendment) Regulations (Northern Ireland) 2012 (S.R. 2012 No. 3)
- The Parking and Waiting Restrictions (Ballymoney) (Amendment) Order (Northern Ireland) 2012 (S.R. 2012 No. 4)
- The Parking and Waiting Restrictions (Belfast) (Amendment) Order (Northern Ireland) 2012 (S.R. 2012 No. 5)
- The Parking Places (Disabled Persons' Vehicles) (Amendment) Order (Northern Ireland) 2012 (S.R. 2012 No. 6)
- The Motor Vehicles (Taxi Drivers’ Licences) (Amendment) Regulations (Northern Ireland) 2012 (S.R. 2012 No. 7)
- The Local Government (Specified Bodies) Regulations (Northern Ireland) 2012 (S.R. 2012 No. 8)
- Licensing and Registration of Clubs (Amendment) (2011 Act) (Commencement No.1) Order (Northern Ireland) 2012 (S.R. 2012 No. 9 (C. 1))
- The Local Government (Constituting Joint Committees as Bodies Corporate) Order (Northern Ireland) 2012 (S.R. 2012 No. 10)
- The Petroleum (Consolidation) Act (Amendment of Licensing Provisions) Regulations (Northern Ireland) 2012 (S.R. 2012 No. 11)
- Plant Protection Products (Amendment) Regulations (Northern Ireland) 2012 (S.R. 2012 No. 12)
- The Clean Neighbourhoods and Environment (2011 Act) (Commencement, Savings and Transitional Provisions) Order (Northern Ireland) 2012 (S.R. 2012 No. 13 (C. 2))
- The Jobseeker's Allowance (Work Experience) (Amendment) Regulations (Northern Ireland) 2012 (S.R. 2012 No. 14)
- The Protection from Tobacco (Sales from Vending Machines) Regulations (Northern Ireland) 2012 (S.R. 2012 No. 15)
- The Road Traffic (2007 Order) (Commencement No. 9) Order (Northern Ireland) 2012 (S.R. 2012 No. 16 (C. 3))
- The Road Traffic (Financial Penalty Deposit) Order (Northern Ireland) 2012 (S.R. 2012 No. 17)
- The Road Traffic (Financial Penalty Deposit) (Appropriate Amount) Order (Northern Ireland) 2012 (S.R. 2012 No. 18)
- The Road Traffic (Immobilisation, Removal and Disposal of Vehicles) Regulations (Northern Ireland) 2012 (S.R. 2012 No. 19)
- The High Hedges (2011 Act) (Commencement) Order (Northern Ireland) 2012 (S.R. 2012 No. 20 (C. 4))
- The Wildlife and Natural Environment (2011 Act) (Commencement No.3) Order (Northern Ireland) 2012 (S.R. 2012 No. 21 (C. 5))
- The Licensing (Form of Licence) (Amendment) Regulations (Northern Ireland) 2012 (S.R. 2012 No. 22)
- The Licensing (Register of Licences) (Amendment) Regulations (Northern Ireland) 2012 (S.R. 2012 No. 23)
- The Licensing (Notice relating to Age) Regulations (Northern Ireland) 2012 (S.R. 2012 No. 24)
- The Spring Traps Approval Order (Northern Ireland) 2012 (S.R. 2012 No. 25)
- The Registration of Clubs (Certificate of Registration) (Amendment) Regulations (Northern Ireland) 2012 (S.R. 2012 No. 26)
- The Registration of Clubs (Notice relating to Age) Regulations (Northern Ireland) 2012 (S.R. 2012 No. 27)
- Licensing and Registration of Clubs (Amendment) (2011 Act) (Commencement No.2) Order (Northern Ireland) 2012 (S.R. 2012 No. 28 (C. 6))
- The Parking and Waiting Restrictions (Omagh) (No. 2) Order (Amendment) Order (Northern Ireland) 2012 (S.R. 2012 No. 29)
- The Ballydogherty Road (U5003), Loughgilly (Abandonment) Order (Northern Ireland) 2012 (S.R. 2012 No. 30)
- The North Circular Road and Tarry Lane, Lurgan (Abandonment) Order (Northern Ireland) 2012 (S.R. 2012 No. 31)
- The Control of Traffic (Belfast) Order (Northern Ireland) 2012 (S.R. 2012 No. 32)
- The High Hedges (Fee) Regulations (Northern Ireland) 2012 (S.R. 2012 No. 33)
- The Controls on Dogs (Non-application to Designated Land) Order (Northern Ireland) 2012 (S.R. 2012 No. 34)
- The Environmental Offences (Fixed Penalties) (Miscellaneous Provisions) Regulations (Northern Ireland) 2012 (S.R. 2012 No. 35)
- The Statutory Nuisances (Insects) Regulations (Northern Ireland) 2012 (S.R. 2012 No. 36)
- The Statutory Nuisances (Artificial Lighting) (Designation of Relevant Sports) Order (Northern Ireland) 2012 (S.R. 2012 No. 37)
- Street Litter Control Notices (Amendment) Order (Northern Ireland) 2012 (S.R. 2012 No. 38)
- The Dog Control Orders (Procedures) Regulations (Northern Ireland) 2012 (S.R. 2012 No. 39)
- The Social Security Pensions (Flat Rate Introduction Year) Order (Northern Ireland) 2012 (S.R. 2012 No. 40)
- The Sunbeds (2011 Act) (Commencement No. 1) Order (Northern Ireland) 2012 (S.R. 2012 No. 41 (C. 7))
- The Health and Personal Social Services (Superannuation Scheme, Injury Benefits and Additional Voluntary Contributions), Health and Social Care (Pension Scheme) (Amendment) Regulations (Northern Ireland) 2012 (S.R. 2012 No. 42)
- The Old Church Road, Newtownabbey (Abandonment) Order (Northern Ireland) 2012 (S.R. 2012 No. 43)
- The Jobseeker's Allowance (Sanctions for Failure to Attend) Regulations (Northern Ireland) 2012 (S.R. 2012 No. 44)
- The Control of Traffic (Carrickfergus) Order (Northern Ireland) 2012 (S.R. 2012 No. 45)
- The Rates (Regional Rates) Order (Northern Ireland) 2012 (S.R. 2012 No. 46)
- The Rates (Microgeneration) Order (Northern Ireland) 2012 (S.R. 2012 No. 47)
- Licensing and Registration of Clubs (Amendment) (2011 Act) (Commencement No.3) Order (Northern Ireland) 2012 (S.R. 2012 No. 48 (C. 8))
- Superannuation (Chief Inspector of Criminal Justice in Northern Ireland) Order (Northern Ireland) 2012 (S.R. 2012 No. 49)
- Superannuation (Police Ombudsman for Northern Ireland) Order (Northern Ireland) 2012 (S.R. 2012 No. 50)
- Superannuation (Commissioner of the Northern Ireland Law Commission) Order (Northern Ireland) 2012 (S.R. 2012 No. 51)
- The Removal and Disposal of Vehicles (Prescribed Periods) Regulations (Northern Ireland) 2012 (S.R. 2012 No. 52)
- The Waiting Restrictions (Ormeau Road, Belfast) Order (Northern Ireland) 2012 (S.R. 2012 No. 53)
- The Cycle Routes (Amendment) Order (Northern Ireland) 2012 (S.R. 2012 No. 54)
- The Bus Lanes (East Bridge Street and Cromac Street, Belfast) Order (Northern Ireland) 2012 (S.R. 2012 No. 55)
- The Parking Places (Disabled Persons' Vehicles) (Amendment No. 2) Order (Northern Ireland) 2012 (S.R. 2012 No. 56)
- The University Terrace, Belfast (Abandonment) Order (Northern Ireland) 2012 (S.R. 2012 No. 57)
- The Shankbridge Road, Ballymena (Abandonment) Order (Northern Ireland) 2012 (S.R. 2012 No. 58)
- The Planning (Environmental Impact Assessment) Regulations (Northern Ireland) 2012 (S.R. 2012 No. 59)
- The Malone Beeches, Belfast (Abandonment) Order (Northern Ireland) 2012 (S.R. 2012 No. 60)
- The Statutory Nuisances (Appeals) Regulations (Northern Ireland) 2012 (S.R. 2012 No. 61)
- The Education (Student Support) (No. 2) Regulations (Northern Ireland) 2009 (Amendment) Regulations (Northern Ireland) 2012 (S.R. 2012 No. 62)
- The Prohibition of Traffic (Lenadoon, Belfast) Order (Northern Ireland) 2012 (S.R. 2012 No. 63)
- Police Service of Northern Ireland Pensions (Amendment) Regulations 2012 (S.R. 2012 No. 64)
- The Aujeszky's Disease Order (Northern Ireland) 2012 (S.R. 2012 No. 65)
- Aujeszky's Disease Scheme Order (Northern Ireland) 2012 (S.R. 2012 No. 66)
- The Pigs (Records, Identification and Movement) Order (Northern Ireland) 2012 (S.R. 2012 No. 67)
- The Health (2009 Act) (Commencement No. 1) Order (Northern Ireland) 2012 (S.R. 2012 No. 68 (C. 9))
- The Parking Places on Roads (Kilkeel) Order (Northern Ireland) 2012 (S.R. 2012 No. 69)
- The Westbourne Avenue, Ballymena (Abandonment) Order (Northern Ireland) 2012 (S.R. 2012 No. 70)
- The Firefighters’ Pension Scheme (Contributions) (Amendment) Order (Northern Ireland) 2012 (S.R. 2012 No. 71)
- The New Firefighters’ Pension Scheme (Contributions) (Amendment) Order (Northern Ireland) 2012 (S.R. 2012 No. 72)
- The Travelling Expenses and Remission of Charges (Amendment) Regulations (Northern Ireland) 2012 (S.R. 2012 No. 73)
- The Road Traffic (Financial Penalty Deposit) (Interest) Order (Northern Ireland) 2012 (S.R. 2012 No. 74)
- The Loading Bays on Roads (Amendment) Order (Northern Ireland) 2012 (S.R. 2012 No. 75)
- The Prohibition of Traffic (Lower Windsor, Belfast) Order (Northern Ireland) 2012 (S.R. 2012 No. 76)
- The Road Traffic Offenders (Prescribed Devices) Order (Northern Ireland) 2012 (S.R. 2012 No. 77)
- The Health and Personal Social Services (Superannuation), Health and Social Care (Pension Scheme) (Amendment) Regulations (Northern Ireland) 2012 (S.R. 2012 No. 78)
- The Rates (Social Sector Value) (Amendment) Regulations (Northern Ireland) 2012 (S.R. 2012 No. 79)
- The Parking Places and Loading Bays on Roads (Londonderry) (Amendment) Order (Northern Ireland) 2012 (S.R. 2012 No. 80)
- The Employment Rights (Increase of Limits) Order (Northern Ireland) 2012 (S.R. 2012 No. 81)
- Police Service of Northern Ireland and Police Service of Northern Ireland Reserve (Injury Benefit) (Amendment) Regulations 2012 (S.R. 2012 No. 82)
- The Mesothelioma Lump Sum Payments (Conditions and Amounts) (Amendment) Regulations (Northern Ireland) 2012 (S.R. 2012 No. 83)
- The Pneumoconiosis, etc., (Workers’ Compensation) (Payment of Claims) (Amendment) Regulations (Northern Ireland) 2012 (S.R. 2012 No. 84)
- Local Government (Payments to Councillors) Regulations (Northern Ireland) 2012 (S.R. 2012 No. 85)
- The Police Act 1997 (Criminal Records) (Amendment) Regulations (Northern Ireland) 2012 (S.R. 2012 No. 86)
- The Social Security Revaluation of Earnings Factors Order (Northern Ireland) 2012 (S.R. 2012 No. 87)
- The Social Security Pensions (Low Earnings Threshold) Order (Northern Ireland) 2012 (S.R. 2012 No. 88)
- The Social Security Pensions (Flat Rate Accrual Amount) Order (Northern Ireland) 2012 (S.R. 2012 No. 89)
- The Sunbeds (2011 Act) (Commencement No. 2) Order (Northern Ireland) 2012 (S.R. 2012 No. 90 (C. 10))
- The Sunbeds (Information) Regulations (Northern Ireland) 2012 (S.R. 2012 No. 91)
- The Sunbeds (Fixed Penalty) (Amount) Regulations (Northern Ireland) 2012 (S.R. 2012 No. 92)
- The Sunbeds (Fixed Penalty) (General) Regulations (Northern Ireland) 2012 (S.R. 2012 No. 93)
- The Belfast International Airport (Control Over Land) Order (Northern Ireland) 2012 (S.R. 2012 No. 94)
- The Foyle Area (Greenbraes Fishery Angling Permits) Regulations 2012 (S.R. 2012 No. 95)
- The Fair Employment (Specification of Public Authorities) (Amendment) Order (Northern Ireland) 2012 (S.R. 2012 No. 96)
- The Guaranteed Minimum Pensions Increase Order (Northern Ireland) 2012 (S.R. 2012 No. 97)
- The Occupational and Personal Pension Schemes (Levies) (Amendment) Regulations (Northern Ireland) 2012 (S.R. 2012 No. 98)
- The Pension Protection Fund and Occupational Pension Schemes (Levy Ceiling and Compensation Cap) Order (Northern Ireland) 2012 (S.R. 2012 No. 99)
- The Social Security (Industrial Injuries) (Prescribed Diseases) (Amendment) Regulations (Northern Ireland) 2012 (S.R. 2012 No. 100)

== 101-200 ==
- The Grange Lodge, Antrim (Abandonment) Order (Northern Ireland) 2012 (S.R. 2012 No. 101)
- The Parking and Waiting Restrictions (Strabane) (Amendment) Order (Northern Ireland) 2012 (S.R. 2012 No. 102)
- The Shore Road and Northwood Parade, Belfast (Abandonment) Order (Northern Ireland) 2012 (S.R. 2012 No. 103)
- The Loopland Court, Belfast (Abandonment) Order (Northern Ireland) 2012 (S.R. 2012 No. 104)
- The High Hedges (Fee Transfer) Regulations (Northern Ireland) 2012 (S.R. 2012 No. 105)
- Rates (Small Business Hereditament Relief) (Amendment) Regulations (Northern Ireland) 2012 (S.R. 2012 No. 106)
- The Social Security (Claims and Payments) (Amendment) Regulations (Northern Ireland) 2012 (S.R. 2012 No. 107)
- The Social Security (Recovery) (Amendment) Regulations (Northern Ireland) 2012 (S.R. 2012 No. 108)
- The Social Security (Credits) (Amendment) Regulations (Northern Ireland) 2012 (S.R. 2012 No. 109)
- The Pensions (2005 Order) (Disclosure of Restricted Information by the Pensions Regulator) (Amendment) Order (Northern Ireland) 2012 (S.R. 2012 No. 110)
- The Recovery of Health Services Charges (Amounts) (Amendment) Regulations (Northern Ireland) 2012 (S.R. 2012 No. 111)
- The Waste (Fees and Charges) (Amendment) Regulations (Northern Ireland) 2012 (S.R. 2012 No. 112)
- The Pensions (Institute and Faculty of Actuaries and Consultation by Employers) (Amendment) Regulations (Northern Ireland) 2012 (S.R. 2012 No. 113)
- The Dog Control Orders (Prescribed Offences and Penalties, etc.) Regulations (Northern Ireland) 2012 (S.R. 2012 No. 114)
- The Pensions (2008 Act) (Commencement No. 3) Order (Northern Ireland) 2012 (S.R. 2012 No. 115 (C. 11))
- The Social Security Benefits Up-rating Order (Northern Ireland) 2012 (S.R. 2012 No. 116)
- The Social Security Benefits Up-rating Regulations (Northern Ireland) 2012 (S.R. 2012 No. 117)
- The Social Security (Industrial Injuries) (Dependency) (Permitted Earnings Limits) Order (Northern Ireland) 2012 (S.R. 2012 No. 118)
- The Pensions (2008 No. 2 Act) (Commencement No. 7) Order (Northern Ireland) 2012 (S.R. 2012 No. 119 (C. 12))
- The Pensions (2008 Act) (Abolition of Contracting-out for Defined Contribution Pension Schemes) (Consequential Provisions) Regulations (Northern Ireland) 2012 (S.R. 2012 No. 120)
- The Social Security (Miscellaneous Amendments) Regulations (Northern Ireland) 2012 (S.R. 2012 No. 121)
- The Valuation Tribunal (Amendment) Rules (Northern Ireland) 2012 (S.R. 2012 No. 122)
- The Identification and Traceability of Explosives (Amendment) (Northern Ireland) Regulations 2012 (S.R. 2012 No. 123)
- The Pensions (2008 No. 2 Act) (Abolition of Protected Rights) (Consequential Provisions) Order (Northern Ireland) 2012 (S.R. 2012 No. 124)
- The Occupational Pension Schemes (Contracting-out and Modification of Schemes) (Amendment) Regulations (Northern Ireland) 2012 (S.R. 2012 No. 125)
- The Teachers’ Superannuation (Amendment) Regulations (Northern Ireland) 2012 (S.R. 2012 No. 126)
- The Road Races (Croft Hill Climb) Order (Northern Ireland) 2012 (S.R. 2012 No. 127)
- The Road Races (Circuit of Ireland International Rally) Order (Northern Ireland) 2012 (S.R. 2012 No. 128)
- The College Avenue, Belfast (Stopping-Up) Order (Northern Ireland) 2012 (S.R. 2012 No. 129)
- The Food Hygiene (Amendment) Regulations (Northern Ireland) 2012 (S.R. 2012 No. 130)
- The Dogs (Amendment) (2011 Act) (Commencement No.3) Order (Northern Ireland) 2012 (S.R. 2012 No. 131 (C. 13))
- The Dogs (Licensing and Identification) Regulations (Northern Ireland) 2012 (S.R. 2012 No. 132)
- The Plant Health (Amendment) Order (Northern Ireland) 2012 (S.R. 2012 No. 133)
- The Medicines (Products for Human Use) (Fees) Regulations 2012 (S.R. 2012 No. 134)
- The Criminal Aid Certificates Rules (Northern Ireland) 2012 (S.R. 2012 No. 135)
- The Education (Student Loans) (Repayment) (Amendment) Regulations (Northern Ireland) 2012 (S.R. 2012 No. 136)
- Pensions Increase (Review) Order (Northern Ireland) 2012 (S.R. 2012 No. 137)
- The Code of Practice (Time Off for Trade Union Duties and Activities) (Appointed Day) Order (Northern Ireland) 2012 (S.R. 2012 No. 138)
- Registered Rents (Increase) Order (Northern Ireland) 2012 (S.R. 2012 No. 139)
- The Social Security (Suspension of Payment of Benefits and Miscellaneous Amendments) Regulations (Northern Ireland) 2012 (S.R. 2012 No. 140)
- The Fuel Payments Scheme (Patients Receiving Treatment for Cancer) Regulations (Northern Ireland) 2012 (S.R. 2012 No. 141)
- The Justice (2011 Act) (Commencement No. 3) Order (Northern Ireland) 2012 (S.R. 2012 No. 142 (C. 14))
- The Parking and Waiting Restrictions (Rathfriland) Order (Northern Ireland) 2012 (S.R. 2012 No. 143)
- The Road Races (Cookstown 100) Order (Northern Ireland) 2012 (S.R. 2012 No. 144)
- The Road Races (Tandragee 100) Order (Northern Ireland) 2012 (S.R. 2012 No. 145)
- The Road Traffic (Immobilisation, Removal and Disposal of Vehicles) (Amendment) Regulations (Northern Ireland) 2012 (S.R. 2012 No. 146)
- The Rates (Deferment) (Revocation and Savings) Regulations (Northern Ireland) 2012 (S.R. 2012 No. 147)
- The Motor Vehicles Testing (Amendment) Regulations (Northern Ireland) 2012 (S.R. 2012 No. 148)
- The Goods Vehicles (Testing) (Amendment) Regulations (Northern Ireland) 2012 (S.R. 2012 No. 149)
- The Motor Vehicles (Construction and Use) (Amendment) Regulations (Northern Ireland) 2012 (S.R. 2012 No. 150)
- The Firefighters’ Pension Scheme (Contributions) (Revocation) Order (Northern Ireland) 2012 (S.R. 2012 No. 151)
- The New Firefighters’ Pension Scheme (Contributions) (Revocation) Order (Northern Ireland) 2012 (S.R. 2012 No. 152)
- The Welfare of Animals (Permitted Procedures by Lay Persons) Regulations (Northern Ireland) 2012 (S.R. 2012 No. 153)
- The Welfare of Animals (2011 Act) (Commencement and Transitional Provisions No.2) Order (Northern Ireland) 2012 (S.R. 2012 No. 154 (C. 15))
- The Jobseeker's Allowance (Domestic Violence) (Amendment) Regulations (Northern Ireland) 2012 (S.R. 2012 No. 155)
- Welfare of Farmed Animals Regulations (Northern Ireland) 2012 (S.R. 2012 No. 156)
- The Housing Benefit (Executive Determinations) (Amendment) Regulations (Northern Ireland) 2012 (S.R. 2012 No. 157)
- The Zoonoses (Fees) (Amendment) Regulations (Northern Ireland) 2012 (S.R. 2012 No. 158)
- The Fuel Allowance Payments Scheme Regulations (Northern Ireland) 2012 (S.R. 2012 No. 159)
- The Employment and Support Allowance (Amendment of Linking Rules) Regulations (Northern Ireland) 2012 (S.R. 2012 No. 160)
- The Firefighters’ Pension Scheme (Amendment) Order (Northern Ireland) 2012 (S.R. 2012 No. 161)
- The New Firefighters’ Pension Scheme (Amendment) Order (Northern Ireland) 2012 (S.R. 2012 No. 162)
- The Child Support (Miscellaneous Amendments) Regulations (Northern Ireland) 2012 (S.R. 2012 No. 163)
- The Road Races (Spamount Hill Climb) Order (Northern Ireland) 2012 (S.R. 2012 No. 164)
- The Waiting Restrictions (Bangor) Order (Northern Ireland) 2012 (S.R. 2012 No. 165)
- The Roads (Speed Limit) Order (Northern Ireland) 2012 (S.R. 2012 No. 166)
- The Health Care (Reimbursement of the Cost of EEA Services etc.) Regulations (Northern Ireland) 2012 (S.R. 2012 No. 167)
- The Misuse of Drugs (Amendment) Regulations (Northern Ireland) 2012 (S.R. 2012 No. 168)
- The Road Transport (Working Time) (Amendment) Regulations (Northern Ireland) 2012 (S.R. 2012 No. 169)
- The Motor Vehicles (Driving Licences) (Amendment) Regulations (Northern Ireland) 2012 (S.R. 2012 No. 170)
- The Road Races (Drumhorc Hill Climb) Order (Northern Ireland) 2012 (S.R. 2012 No. 171)
- The Trunk Road T9 (Coleman's Corner to Ballyrickard Road) Order (Northern Ireland) 2012 (S.R. 2012 No. 172)
- The Whole of Government Accounts (Designation of Bodies) Order (Northern Ireland) 2012 (S.R. 2012 No. 173)
- The Private Accesses (A8 Belfast to Larne Dual Carriageway (Coleman's Corner to Ballyrickard Road)) Stopping-Up Order (Northern Ireland) 2012 (S.R. 2012 No. 174)
- The Road Races (North West 200) Order (Northern Ireland) 2012 (S.R. 2012 No. 175)
- The Diseases of Animals (Importation of Machinery and Vehicles) Order (Northern Ireland) 2012 (S.R. 2012 No. 176)
- The Carriage of Explosives (Amendment) Regulations (Northern Ireland) 2012 (S.R. 2012 No. 177)
- Police Service of Northern Ireland (Amendment) Regulations 2012 (S.R. 2012 No. 178)
- The Control of Asbestos Regulations (Northern Ireland) 2012 (S.R. 2012 No. 179)
- The Food Additives (Amendment) and the Extraction Solvents in Food (Amendment) Regulations (Northern Ireland) 2012 (S.R. 2012 No. 180)
- The Jobseeker's Allowance (Amendment) Regulations (Northern Ireland) 2012 (S.R. 2012 No. 181)
- The Children's Homes (Amendment) Regulations (Northern Ireland) 2012 (S.R. 2012 No. 182)
- Local Government Pension Scheme (Amendment) Regulations (Northern Ireland) 2012 (S.R. 2012 No. 183)
- The Student Fees (Amounts) (Amendment) Regulations (Northern Ireland) 2012 (S.R. 2012 No. 184)
- The Potatoes Originating in Egypt (Amendment) Regulations (Northern Ireland) 2012 (S.R. 2012 No. 185)
- The Building Regulations (2009 Amendment Act) (Commencement No. 2) Order (Northern Ireland) 2012 (S.R. 2012 No. 186 (C. 16))
- The Building Regulations (1979 Order) (Commencement No. 3) Order (Northern Ireland) 2012 (S.R. 2012 No. 187 (C. 17))
- The Penalty Notices (Justice Act (Northern Ireland) 2011) (Enforcement of Fines) Regulations (Northern Ireland) 2012 (S.R. 2012 No. 188)
- The Magistrates’ Courts (Amendment) Rules (Northern Ireland) 2012 (S.R. 2012 No. 189)
- The Magistrates’ Courts (Declarations of Parentage) (Amendment) Rules (Northern Ireland) 2012 (S.R. 2012 No. 190)
- The Prison Service (Pay Review Body) Regulations (Northern Ireland) 2012 (S.R. 2012 No. 191)
- The Building Regulations (Northern Ireland) 2012 (S.R. 2012 No. 192)
- The Cycle Routes (Amendment No. 2) Order (Northern Ireland) 2012 (S.R. 2012 No. 193)
- The Parking Places (Disabled Persons’ Vehicles) (Amendment No. 3) Order (Northern Ireland) 2012 (S.R. 2012 No. 194)
- The Waiting Restrictions (Lisburn) Order (Northern Ireland) 2012 (S.R. 2012 No. 195)
- The Durham Street and Hamill Street - Killen Street, Belfast (Stopping-Up) Order (Northern Ireland) 2012 (S.R. 2012 No. 196)
- The Control of Traffic (Belfast City Centre) Order (Northern Ireland) 2012 (S.R. 2012 No. 197)
- The Bus Lanes (Belfast City Centre) Order (Northern Ireland) 2012 (S.R. 2012 No. 198)
- The Waiting Restrictions (Belfast City Centre) Order (Northern Ireland) 2012 (S.R. 2012 No. 199)
- The Cycle Routes (Amendment No. 3) Order (Northern Ireland) 2012 (S.R. 2012 No. 200)

== 201-300 ==
- The Parking Places on Roads (Coaches) Order (Northern Ireland) 2012 (S.R. 2012 No. 201)
- The Parking Places on Roads (Belfast City Centre) Order (Northern Ireland) 2012 (S.R. 2012 No. 202)
- The Penalty Charges (Prescribed Amounts) (Amendment) Regulations (Northern Ireland) 2012 (S.R. 2012 No. 203)
- The Road Races (Mid-Antrim 150) Order (Northern Ireland) 2012 (S.R. 2012 No. 204)
- The Road Races (Cairncastle Hill Climb) Order (Northern Ireland) 2012 (S.R. 2012 No. 205)
- The Road Races (Bush, Dungannon) Order (Northern Ireland) 2012 (S.R. 2012 No. 206)
- The Route U5160, Carnbane Industrial Estate, Newry (Abandonment) Order (Northern Ireland) 2012 (S.R. 2012 No. 207)
- The Route B30 Newry Road, Crossmaglen (Abandonment) Order (Northern Ireland) 2012 (S.R. 2012 No. 208)
- The Marine Highway, Carrickfergus (Abandonment) Order (Northern Ireland) 2012 (S.R. 2012 No. 209)
- The Longlands Avenue, Newtownabbey (Abandonment) Order (Northern Ireland) 2012 (S.R. 2012 No. 210)
- The Browning Drive, Londonderry (Abandonment) Order (Northern Ireland) 2012 (S.R. 2012 No. 211)
- The Misuse of Drugs (Designation) (Amendment) Order (Northern Ireland) 2012 (S.R. 2012 No. 212)
- The Misuse of Drugs (Amendment No.2) Regulations (Northern Ireland) 2012 (S.R. 2012 No. 213)
- The Justice (2011 Act) (Commencement No. 4 and Transitory Provision) Order (Northern Ireland) 2012 (S.R. 2012 No. 214 (C. 18))
- The Statistics and Registration Service Act 2007 (Disclosure of Social Security Information) Regulations (Northern Ireland) 2012 (S.R. 2012 No. 215)
- The Off-Street Parking (Amendment) Order (Northern Ireland) 2012 (S.R. 2012 No. 216)
- The Valuation Tribunal (Amendment No. 2) Rules (Northern Ireland) 2012 (S.R. 2012 No. 217)
- The Quality of Bathing Water (Amendment) Regulations (Northern Ireland) 2012 (S.R. 2012 No. 218)
- The Safety of Sports Grounds (Fees and Appeals) (Amendment) Regulations (Northern Ireland) 2012 (S.R. 2012 No. 219)
- The Waiting Restrictions (Larne) Order (Northern Ireland) 2012 (S.R. 2012 No. 220)
- The Roads (Speed Limit) (No. 2) Order (Northern Ireland) 2012 (S.R. 2012 No. 221)
- The Parking Places on Roads (Larne) (Amendment) Order (Northern Ireland) 2012 (S.R. 2012 No. 222)
- The Parking Places on Roads (Toome) Order (Northern Ireland) 2012 (S.R. 2012 No. 223)
- The Parking and Waiting Restrictions (Strabane) (Amendment No. 2) Order (Northern Ireland) 2012 (S.R. 2012 No. 224)
- The Loading Bays and Parking Places on Roads (Amendment) Order (Northern Ireland) 2012 (S.R. 2012 No. 225)
- The Police and Criminal Evidence (1989 Order) (Codes of Practice) (Temporary Modification to Code A) Order (Northern Ireland) 2012 (S.R. 2012 No. 226)
- The Parking Places (Disabled Persons' Vehicles) (Amendment No. 4) Order (Northern Ireland) 2012 (S.R. 2012 No. 227)
- The Road Races (Down Special Stages Rally) Order (Northern Ireland) 2012 (S.R. 2012 No. 228)
- The Foster Placement (Children) (Amendment) Regulations (Northern Ireland) 2012 (S.R. 2012 No. 229)
- The Fluorinated Greenhouse Gases (Amendment) Regulations (Northern Ireland) 2012 (S.R. 2012 No. 230)
- The Nitrates Action Programme (Amendment) Regulations (Northern Ireland) 2012 (S.R. 2012 No. 231)
- The Automatic Enrolment (Miscellaneous Amendments) Regulations (Northern Ireland) 2012 (S.R. 2012 No. 232)
- The Pensions (2012 Act) (Commencement No. 1) Order (Northern Ireland) 2012 (S.R. 2012 No. 233 (C. 19))
- The Pensions (2008 Act) (Commencement No. 4) Order (Northern Ireland) 2012 (S.R. 2012 No. 234 (C. 20))
- The M2 Motorway at Whitla Street, Belfast (Abandonment) Order (Northern Ireland) 2012 (S.R. 2012 No. 235)
- The Pensions (2008 No. 2 Act) (Commencement No. 8) Order (Northern Ireland) 2012 (S.R. 2012 No. 236 (C. 21))
- The Occupational and Personal Pension Schemes (Automatic Enrolment) (Amendment) Regulations (Northern Ireland) 2012 (S.R. 2012 No. 237)
- The Occupational and Personal Pension Schemes (Automatic Enrolment) (Amendment No. 2) Regulations (Northern Ireland) 2012 (S.R. 2012 No. 238)
- Pre-School Education in Schools (Admissions Criteria) (Amendment) Regulations (Northern Ireland) 2012 (S.R. 2012 No. 239)
- The Automatic Enrolment (Earnings Trigger and Qualifying Earnings Band) Order (Northern Ireland) 2012 (S.R. 2012 No. 240)
- The Plant Health (Amendment No.2) Order (Northern Ireland) 2012 (S.R. 2012 No. 241)
- The Road Races (Armoy Motorcycle Race) Order (Northern Ireland) 2012 (S.R. 2012 No. 242)
- The Waiting Restrictions (Londonderry) (Amendment) Order (Northern Ireland) 2012 (S.R. 2012 No. 243)
- The Tobacco Advertising and Promotion (Specialist Tobacconists) Regulations (Northern Ireland) 2012 (S.R. 2012 No. 244)
- The Industrial Training Levy (Construction Industry) Order (Northern Ireland) 2012 (S.R. 2012 No. 245)
- The Tobacco Advertising and Promotion (Display) Regulations (Northern Ireland) 2012 (S.R. 2012 No. 246)
- The Goods Vehicles (Licensing of Operators) (2010 Act) (Commencement No. 1) Order (Northern Ireland) 2012 (S.R. 2012 No. 247 (C. 22))
- The Community Drivers’ Hours Regulations (Northern Ireland) 2012 (S.R. 2012 No. 248)
- The Licensing (Requirements for Conference Centre) (Amendment) Regulations (Northern Ireland) 2012 (S.R. 2012 No. 249)
- The Smoke Control Areas (Exempted Fireplaces) Regulations (Northern Ireland) 2012 (S.R. 2012 No. 250)
- The Loading Bays on Roads (Amendment No. 2) Order (Northern Ireland) 2012 (S.R. 2012 No. 251)
- The Traffic Weight Restriction (Amendment) Order (Northern Ireland) 2012 (S.R. 2012 No. 252)
- The Off-Street Parking (Amendment No. 2) Order (Northern Ireland) 2012 (S.R. 2012 No. 253)
- Agriculture (Student fees)(Amendment) Regulations (Northern Ireland) 2012 (S.R. 2012 No. 254)
- The Health and Safety (Fees) Regulations (Northern Ireland) 2012 (S.R. 2012 No. 255)
- The Goods Vehicles (Licensing of Operators) (Exemption) Regulations (Northern Ireland) 2012 (S.R. 2012 No. 256)
- The Goods Vehicles (Qualifications of Operators) Regulations (Northern Ireland) 2012 (S.R. 2012 No. 257)
- The Goods Vehicles (Enforcement Powers) Regulations (Northern Ireland) 2012 (S.R. 2012 No. 258)
- Optical Charges and Payments (Amendment) Regulations (Northern Ireland) 2012 (S.R. 2012 No. 259)
- The Goods Vehicles (Licensing of Operators) (Fees) Regulations (Northern Ireland) 2012 (S.R. 2012 No. 260)
- The Goods Vehicles (Licensing of Operators) Regulations (Northern Ireland) 2012 (S.R. 2012 No. 261)
- The Goods Vehicles (Licensing of Operators) (2010 Act) (Commencement No. 2 and Transitional Provisions) Order (Northern Ireland) 2012 (S.R. 2012 No. 262 (C. 23))
- The Race Relations Order 1997 (Amendment) Order (Northern Ireland) 2012 (S.R. 2012 No. 263)
- The Social Security (Industrial Injuries) (Prescribed Diseases) (Amendment No. 2) Regulations (Northern Ireland) 2012 (S.R. 2012 No. 264)
- The Pensions (2012 Act) (Commencement No. 2) Order (Northern Ireland) 2012 (S.R. 2012 No. 265 (C. 24))
- The Pensions (2008 No. 2 Act) (Commencement No. 9) Order (Northern Ireland) 2012 (S.R. 2012 No. 266 (C. 25))
- The Hybrid Schemes Quality Requirements Rules (Northern Ireland) 2012 (S.R. 2012 No. 267)
- The Criminal Legal Aid (Recovery of Defence Costs Orders) Rules (Northern Ireland) 2012 (S.R. 2012 No. 268)
- The Road Races (Eagles Rock Hill Climb) Order (Northern Ireland) 2012 (S.R. 2012 No. 269)
- The Pension Protection Fund (Miscellaneous Amendments) Regulations (Northern Ireland) 2012 (S.R. 2012 No. 270)
- Local Government Best Value (Exclusion of Non-commercial Considerations) Order (Northern Ireland) 2012 (S.R. 2012 No. 271)
- The Rules of the Court of Judicature (Northern Ireland) (Amendment) 2012 (S.R. 2012 No. 272)
- The Rules of the Court of Judicature (Northern Ireland) (Amendment No.2) 2012 (S.R. 2012 No. 273)
- The M3 Motorway at Titanic Quarter Railway Station, Belfast (Abandonment) Order (Northern Ireland) 2012 (S.R. 2012 No. 274)
- The Upper Dunmurry Lane, Dunmurry (Abandonment) Order (Northern Ireland) 2012 (S.R. 2012 No. 275)
- The Parking Places on Roads (Armagh) (Amendment) Order (Northern Ireland) 2012 (S.R. 2012 No. 276)
- The Prohibition of Right-Hand Turn (Enniskillen) Order (Northern Ireland) 2012 (S.R. 2012 No. 277)
- The Road Races (Craigantlet Hill Climb) Order (Northern Ireland) 2012 (S.R. 2012 No. 278)
- Local Government (Councillors’ Remuneration Panel) Regulations (Northern Ireland) 2012 (S.R. 2012 No. 279)
- The Food Hygiene (Amendment) (No. 2) Regulations (Northern Ireland) 2012 (S.R. 2012 No. 280)
- The Road Races (Garron Point Hill Climb) Order (Northern Ireland) 2012 (S.R. 2012 No. 281)
- The Road Races (Spelga Hill Climb) Order (Northern Ireland) 2012 (S.R. 2012 No. 282)
- Public Interest Disclosure (Prescribed Persons) (Amendment) Order (Northern Ireland) 2012 (S.R. 2012 No. 283)
- The Jobseeker's Allowance (Members of the Reserve Forces) Regulations (Northern Ireland) 2012 (S.R. 2012 No. 284)
- Superannuation (Charity Commission for Northern Ireland) Order (Northern Ireland) 2012 (S.R. 2012 No. 285)
- The Corporate Manslaughter and Corporate Homicide (2007 Act) (Commencement) Order (Northern Ireland) 2012 (S.R. 2012 No. 286 (C. 26))
- The Waiting Restrictions (Holywood) Order (Northern Ireland) 2012 (S.R. 2012 No. 287)
- The On-Street Parking (Amendment) Order (Northern Ireland) 2012 (S.R. 2012 No. 288)
- The Off-Street Parking (Amendment No. 3) Order (Northern Ireland) 2012 (S.R. 2012 No. 289)
- The Parking Places on Roads (Electric Vehicles) Order (Northern Ireland) 2012 (S.R. 2012 No. 290)
- The Road Races (Ulster Grand Prix Bike Week) Order (Northern Ireland) 2012 (S.R. 2012 No. 291)
- The Social Fund Maternity and Funeral Expenses (General) (Amendment) Regulations (Northern Ireland) 2012 (S.R. 2012 No. 292)
- The Planning (Fees) (Amendment) Regulations (Northern Ireland) 2012 (S.R. 2012 No. 293)
- The Pensions (Financial Reporting Council) (Amendment) Regulations (Northern Ireland) 2012 (S.R. 2012 No. 294)
- The Drumlin Road, Donaghcloney (Abandonment) Order (Northern Ireland) 2012 (S.R. 2012 No. 295)
- The A3 Northway, Portadown (Abandonment) Order (Northern Ireland) 2012 (S.R. 2012 No. 296)
- The Waiting Restrictions (Bushmills) Order (Northern Ireland) 2012 (S.R. 2012 No. 297)
- The Taxis (Bushmills) Order (Northern Ireland) 2012 (S.R. 2012 No. 298)
- The Marketing of Fresh Horticulture Produce (Amendment) Regulations (Northern Ireland) 2012 (S.R. 2012 No. 299)
- The Road Races (Ulster Rally) Order (Northern Ireland) 2012 (S.R. 2012 No. 300)

== 301-400 ==
- The Labour Relations Agency Arbitration Scheme Order (Northern Ireland) 2012 (S.R. 2012 No. 301)
- The Labour Relations Agency Arbitration Scheme (Jurisdiction) Order (Northern Ireland) 2012 (S.R. 2012 No. 302)
- The Trunk Road T3 (Western Transport Corridor) Order (Northern Ireland) 2012 (S.R. 2012 No. 303)
- The Private Accesses on the A5 Western Transport Corridor (Stopping-Up) Order (Northern Ireland) 2012 (S.R. 2012 No. 304)
- The Northern Ireland Poultry Health Assurance Scheme (Fees) Order (Northern Ireland) 2012 (S.R. 2012 No. 305)
- The Further Education (Student Support) (Eligibility) Regulations (Northern Ireland) 2012 (S.R. 2012 No. 306)
- The Health (2006 Act) (Commencement) Order (Northern Ireland) 2012 (S.R. 2012 No. 307 (C. 27))
- The Pharmacy (1976 Order) (Amendment) Order (Northern Ireland) 2012 (S.R. 2012 No. 308)
- The Council of the Pharmaceutical Society of Northern Ireland (Appointments and Procedure) Regulations (Northern Ireland) 2012 (S.R. 2012 No. 309)
- The Council of the Pharmaceutical Society of Northern Ireland (Statutory Committee, Scrutiny Committee and Advisers) Regulations (Northern Ireland) 2012 (S.R. 2012 No. 310)
- The Council of the Pharmaceutical Society of Northern Ireland (Fitness to Practise and Disqualification) Regulations (Northern Ireland) 2012 (S.R. 2012 No. 311)
- The Council of the Pharmaceutical Society of Northern Ireland (Continuing Professional Development) Regulations (Northern Ireland) 2012 (S.R. 2012 No. 312)
- The Taxis (2008 Act) (Commencement No. 2) Order (Northern Ireland) 2012 (S.R. 2012 No. 313 (C. 28))
- The Tuberculosis Control (Amendment) Order (Northern Ireland) 2012 (S.R. 2012 No. 314)
- The Brucellosis Control (Amendment) Order (Northern Ireland) 2012 (S.R. 2012 No. 315)
- The Taxi Operators Licensing Regulations (Northern Ireland) 2012 (S.R. 2012 No. 316)
- The Parking and Waiting Restrictions (Belfast) (Amendment No. 2) Order (Northern Ireland) 2012 (S.R. 2012 No. 317)
- Rehabilitation of Offenders (Exceptions) (Amendment) Order (Northern Ireland) 2012 (S.R. 2012 No. 318)
- The Safeguarding Vulnerable Groups (Prescribed Criteria and Miscellaneous Provisions) (Amendment) Regulations (Northern Ireland) 2012 (S.R. 2012 No. 319)
- The Safeguarding Vulnerable Groups (Miscellaneous Amendments) Order (Northern Ireland) 2012 (S.R. 2012 No. 320)
- The Police Act 1997 (Criminal Records) (Amendment No. 2) Regulations (Northern Ireland) 2012 (S.R. 2012 No. 321)
- The Safeguarding Vulnerable Groups (Miscellaneous Provisions) Order (Northern Ireland) 2012 (S.R. 2012 No. 322)
- The Safeguarding Vulnerable Groups (Miscellaneous Provisions) Regulations (Northern Ireland) 2012 (S.R. 2012 No. 323)
- The Safeguarding Board for Northern Ireland (Membership, Procedure, Functions and Committee) Regulations (Northern Ireland) 2012 (S.R. 2012 No. 324)
- The Sexual Offences Act 2003 (Prescribed Police Stations) Regulations (Northern Ireland) 2012 (S.R. 2012 No. 325)
- The Prohibition of Traffic (Rosemeount Gardens, Londonderry) Order (Northern Ireland) 2012 (S.R. 2012 No. 326)
- The On-Street Parking (Amendment No. 2) Order (Northern Ireland) 2012 (S.R. 2012 No. 327)
- The Goods Vehicles (Testing) (Fees) (Amendment) Regulations (Northern Ireland) 2012 (S.R. 2012 No. 328)
- The Planning (General Development) (Amendment) Order (Northern Ireland) 2012 (S.R. 2012 No. 329)
- The Safeguarding Vulnerable Groups (2007 Order) (Commencement No. 7) Order (Northern Ireland) 2012 (S.R. 2012 No. 330 (C. 29))
- The Occupational Pension Schemes (Disclosure of Information) (Amendment) Regulations (Northern Ireland) 2012 (S.R. 2012 No. 331)
- The Employers’ Duties (Implementation) (Amendment) Regulations (Northern Ireland) 2012 (S.R. 2012 No. 332)
- The Off-Street Parking (Amendment No. 4) Order (Northern Ireland) 2012 (S.R. 2012 No. 333)
- The Assembly Members (Independent Financial Review and Standards) (2011 Act) (Commencement) Order (Northern Ireland) 2012 (S.R. 2012 No. 334 (C. 30))
- The Alien and Locally Absent Species in Aquaculture Regulations (Northern Ireland) 2012 (S.R. 2012 No. 335)
- The Foyle and Carlingford Fisheries (2007 Order) (Commencement No. 2) Order (Northern Ireland) 2012 (S.R. 2012 No. 336 (C. 31))
- The Road Traffic (2007 Order) (Commencement No. 5) (Amendment) Order (Northern Ireland) 2012 (S.R. 2012 No. 337)
- The Safeguarding Board (2011 Act) (Commencement No. 1) Order (Northern Ireland) 2012 (S.R. 2012 No. 338 (C. 32))
- The Trunk Road T14 (A55 Knock Road, Belfast) Order (Northern Ireland) 2012 (S.R. 2012 No. 339)
- The Private Accesses at A55 Knock Road, Belfast (Stopping-Up) Order (Northern Ireland) 2012 (S.R. 2012 No. 340)
- The Tobacco Advertising and Promotion (Display of Prices) Regulations (Northern Ireland) 2012 (S.R. 2012 No. 341)
- The Cycle Routes (Amendment No. 4) Order (Northern Ireland) 2012 (S.R. 2012 No. 342)
- The Waiting Restrictions (John Street, Castlederg) Order (Northern Ireland) 2012 (S.R. 2012 No. 343)
- The Waiting Restrictions (Springfield Road, Belfast) Order (Northern Ireland) 2012 (S.R. 2012 No. 344)
- The Roads (Speed Limit) (No. 3) Order (Northern Ireland) 2012 (S.R. 2012 No. 345)
- The Parking Places and Loading Bays on Roads (Londonderry) (Amendment No. 2) Order (Northern Ireland) 2012 (S.R. 2012 No. 346)
- The Parking Places (Disabled Persons' Vehicles) (Amendment No. 5) Order (Northern Ireland) 2012 (S.R. 2012 No. 347)
- The On-Street Parking (Amendment No. 3) Order (Northern Ireland) 2012 (S.R. 2012 No. 348)
- The Mental Health (1986 Order) (Commencement No. 5) Order (Northern Ireland) 2012 (S.R. 2012 No. 349 (C. 33))
- The Waiting Restrictions (Dundonald) Order (Northern Ireland) 2012 (S.R. 2012 No. 350)
- The Waiting Restrictions (Dungannon) (Amendment) Order (Northern Ireland) 2012 (S.R. 2012 No. 351)
- The Waiting Restrictions (Londonderry) (Amendment No. 2) Order (Northern Ireland) 2012 (S.R. 2012 No. 352)
- The Cycle Routes (Amendment No. 5) Order (Northern Ireland) 2012 (S.R. 2012 No. 353)
- The Motor Vehicles (Driving Licences) (Fees) (Amendment) Regulations (Northern Ireland) 2012 (S.R. 2012 No. 354)
- The Motor Vehicles (Driving Licences) (Amendment No. 2) Regulations (Northern Ireland) 2012 (S.R. 2012 No. 355)
- The Parking and Waiting Restrictions (Newtownards) Order (Northern Ireland) 2012 (S.R. 2012 No. 356)
- The Loading Bays on Roads (Amendment No. 3) Order (Northern Ireland) 2012 (S.R. 2012 No. 357)
- The Parking Places on Roads (Kilkeel) (No. 2) Order (Northern Ireland) 2012 (S.R. 2012 No. 358)
- The Tullynacross Road, Lisburn (Abandonment) Order (Northern Ireland) 2012 (S.R. 2012 No. 359)
- The Templemore Street, Belfast (Abandonment) Order (Northern Ireland) 2012 (S.R. 2012 No. 360)
- The C156 (Unnamed road), Moyraverty, Craigavon (Abandonment) Order (Northern Ireland) 2012 (S.R. 2012 No. 361)
- The Waiting Restrictions (Lisburn) (No. 2) Order (Northern Ireland) 2012 (S.R. 2012 No. 362)
- The Loading Bays on Roads (Amendment No. 4) Order (Northern Ireland) 2012 (S.R. 2012 No. 363)
- The Prohibition of Waiting (Amendment) Order (Northern Ireland) 2012 (S.R. 2012 No. 364)
- The Scheme for Construction Contracts in Northern Ireland (Amendment) Regulations (Northern Ireland) 2012 (S.R. 2012 No. 365)
- The Construction Contracts Exclusion Order (Northern Ireland) 2012 (S.R. 2012 No. 366)
- The Construction Contracts (2011 Act) (Commencement) Order (Northern Ireland) 2012 (S.R. 2012 No. 367 (C. 34))
- The Conservation (Natural Habitats, etc.) (Amendment) Regulations (Northern Ireland) 2012 (S.R. 2012 No. 368)
- The Social Fund (Cold Weather Payments) (General) (Amendment) Regulations (Northern Ireland) 2012 (S.R. 2012 No. 369)
- The Parking Places (Disabled Persons' Vehicles) (Amendment No. 6) Order (Northern Ireland) 2012 (S.R. 2012 No. 370)
- The Loading Bays and Parking Places on Roads (Amendment No. 2) Order (Northern Ireland) 2012 (S.R. 2012 No. 371)
- The Pensions (2008 No. 2 Act) (Commencement No. 10 and Supplementary Provisions) Order (Northern Ireland) 2012 (S.R. 2012 No. 372 (C. 35))
- The Tenancy Deposit Schemes Regulations (Northern Ireland) 2012 (S.R. 2012 No. 373)
- The Child Support (Great Britain Reciprocal Arrangements) (Amendment) Regulations (Northern Ireland) 2012 (S.R. 2012 No. 374)
- The Building (Amendment) Regulations (Northern Ireland) 2012 (S.R. 2012 No. 375)
- The Police and Criminal Evidence (Northern Ireland) Order 1989 (Codes of Practice) (Revision of Codes C, E, F and H) Order 2012 (S.R. 2012 No. 376)
- The Social Security (Miscellaneous Amendments No. 2) Regulations (Northern Ireland) 2012 (S.R. 2012 No. 377)
- The Travelling Expenses and Remission of Charges (Amendment No. 2) Regulations (Northern Ireland) 2012 (S.R. 2012 No. 378)
- The Smoke Control Areas (Exempted Fireplaces) (No. 2) Regulations (Northern Ireland) 2012 (S.R. 2012 No. 379)
- The Social Security (Habitual Residence) (Amendment) Regulations (Northern Ireland) 2012 (S.R. 2012 No. 380)
- THE ELECTRICITY SAFETY, QUALITY AND CONTINUITY REGULATIONS (NORTHERN IRELAND) 2012 (S.R. 2012 No. 381)
- The Off-Street Parking (Amendment No. 5) Order (Northern Ireland) 2012 (S.R. 2012 No. 382)
- The Bluetongue (Amendment) Regulations (Northern Ireland) 2012 (S.R. 2012 No. 383)
- The Materials and Articles in Contact with Food Regulations (Northern Ireland) 2012 (S.R. 2012 No. 384)
- Electricity (Priority Dispatch) Regulations (Northern Ireland) 2012 (S.R. 2012 No. 385)
- The Welfare of Animals (2011 Act) (Commencement No. 3) Order (Northern Ireland) 2012 (S.R. 2012 No. 386 (C. 36))
- The Welfare of Animals (Docking of Working Dogs’ Tails and Miscellaneous Amendments) Regulations (Northern Ireland) 2012 (S.R. 2012 No. 387)
- Commissioner for Older People Act 2011(Commencement) Order (Northern Ireland) 2012 (S.R. 2012 No. 388 (C. 37))
- The Health (2009 Act) (Commencement No. 2) Order (Northern Ireland) 2012 (S.R. 2012 No. 389 (C. 38))
- The Occupational and Personal Pension Schemes (Automatic Enrolment) (Amendment No. 3) Regulations (Northern Ireland) 2012 (S.R. 2012 No. 390)
- Legal Aid (General) (Amendment) Regulations (Northern Ireland) 2012 (S.R. 2012 No. 391)
- The Plant Health (Amendment No.3) Order (Northern Ireland) 2012 (S.R. 2012 No. 392)
- Superannuation (Commission for Victims and Survivors for Northern Ireland) Order (Northern Ireland) 2012 (S.R. 2012 No. 393)
- The Social Security (Credits) (Amendment No. 2) Regulations (Northern Ireland) 2012 (S.R. 2012 No. 394)
- The Firearms (Northern Ireland) Order 2004 (Amendment) Regulations 2012 (S.R. 2012 No. 395)
- The Renewable Heat Incentive Scheme Regulations (Northern Ireland) 2012 (S.R. 2012 No. 396)
- Fisheries (Amendment) Regulations (Northern Ireland) 2012 (S.R. 2012 No. 397)
- The Education (Student Support) (No. 2) Regulations (Northern Ireland) 2009 (Amendment) (No. 2) Regulations (Northern Ireland) 2012 (S.R. 2012 No. 398)
- The Smoke Control Areas (Authorised Fuels) Regulations (Northern Ireland) 2012 (S.R. 2012 No. 399)
- The Plant Health (Wood and Bark) (Amendment) Order (Northern Ireland) 2012 (S.R. 2012 No. 400)

== 401-500 ==
- Mental Health (Private Hospitals) (Fees) Regulations (Northern Ireland) 2012 (S.R. 2012 No. 401)
- The County Court (Amendment) Rules (Northern Ireland) 2012 (S.R. 2012 No. 402)
- Mental Health (Private Hospitals) Regulations (Northern Ireland) 2012 (S.R. 2012 No. 403)
- The Parking Places on Roads (Belfast) Order (Northern Ireland) 2012 (S.R. 2012 No. 404)
- Licensing and Registration of Clubs (Amendment) (2011 Act) (Commencement No.4) Order (Northern Ireland) 2012 (S.R. 2012 No. 405 (C. 39))
- The Civil Registration (2011 Act) (Commencement No. 2) Order (Northern Ireland) 2012 (S.R. 2012 No. 406 (C. 40))
- The Juries (Amendment) Regulations (Northern Ireland) 2012 (S.R. 2012 No. 407)
- The Civil Registration Regulations (Northern Ireland) 2012 (S.R. 2012 No. 408)
- The Off-Street Parking (Amendment No. 6) Order (Northern Ireland) 2012 (S.R. 2012 No. 409)
- The Roads (Speed Limit) (No. 4) Order (Northern Ireland) 2012 (S.R. 2012 No. 410)
- The Control of Traffic (Apsley Street, Belfast) Order (Northern Ireland) 2012 (S.R. 2012 No. 411)
- The Bus Lanes (East Bridge Street and Cromac Street, Belfast) (Amendment) Order (Northern Ireland) 2012 (S.R. 2012 No. 412)
- The International Recovery of Maintenance (Hague Convention 2007 etc.) Regulations (Northern Ireland) 2012 (S.R. 2012 No. 413)
- The Magistrates’ Courts (Civil Jurisdiction and Judgments Act 1982) (Amendment) Rules (Northern Ireland) 2012 (S.R. 2012 No. 414)
- The Magistrates’ Courts (Amendment No.2) Rules (Northern Ireland) 2012 (S.R. 2012 No. 415)
- Cattle Identification (Miscellaneous Amendments) Regulations (Northern Ireland) 2012 (S.R. 2012 No. 416)
- The Local Government (2005 Order) (Commencement No. 3) Order (Northern Ireland) 2012 (S.R. 2012 No. 417 (C. 41))
- The Cycle Routes (Amendment No. 6) Order (Northern Ireland) 2012 (S.R. 2012 No. 418)
- The Legal Advice and Assistance (Amendment) Regulations (Northern Ireland) 2012 (S.R. 2012 No. 419)
- Licensing and Registration of Clubs (Amendment) (2011 Act) (Commencement No.5) Order (Northern Ireland) 2012 (S.R. 2012 No. 420 (C. 42))
- Local Government (Boundaries) Order (Northern Ireland) 2012 (S.R. 2012 No. 421)
- Local Government (Indemnities for Members and Officers) Order (Northern Ireland) 2012 (S.R. 2012 No. 422)
- The Child Maintenance (2008 Act) (Commencement No. 9) Order (Northern Ireland) 2012 (S.R. 2012 No. 423 (C. 43))
- The Welfare Reform (2010 Act) (Commencement No. 5) Order (Northern Ireland) 2012 (S.R. 2012 No. 424 (C. 44))
- The Waiting Restrictions (Ahoghill) Order (Northern Ireland) 2012 (S.R. 2012 No. 425)
- The Occupational Pensions (Revaluation) Order (Northern Ireland) 2012 (S.R. 2012 No. 426)
- The Child Support Maintenance Calculation Regulations (Northern Ireland) 2012 (S.R. 2012 No. 427)
- The Child Support Maintenance (Changes to Basic Rate Calculation and Minimum Amount of Liability) Regulations (Northern Ireland) 2012 (S.R. 2012 No. 428)
- Allocation of Housing and Homelessness (Eligibility) (Amendment) Regulations (Northern Ireland) 2012 (S.R. 2012 No. 429)
- The Magistrates’ Courts (Costs in Criminal Cases) (Amendment) Rules (Northern Ireland) 2012 (S.R. 2012 No. 430)
- The Rules of the Court of Judicature (Northern Ireland) (Amendment No.3) 2012 (S.R. 2012 No. 431)
- The Loading Bays on Roads (Amendment No. 5) Order (Northern Ireland) 2012 (S.R. 2012 No. 432)
- The Parking Places, Loading Bay and Waiting Restrictions (Randalstown) Order (Northern Ireland) 2012 (S.R. 2012 No. 433)
- The Parking Places on Roads (Donaghmore) Order (Northern Ireland) 2012 (S.R. 2012 No. 434)
- The Licensing (Irresponsible Drinks Promotions) Regulations (Northern Ireland) 2012 (S.R. 2012 No. 435)
- The Registration of Clubs (Irresponsible Drinks Promotions) Regulations (Northern Ireland) 2012 (S.R. 2012 No. 436)
- The Producer Responsibility Obligations (Packaging Waste) (Amendment) Regulations (Northern Ireland) 2012 (S.R. 2012 No. 437)
- The Child Support (Meaning of Child and New Calculation Rules) (Consequential and Miscellaneous Amendments) Regulations (Northern Ireland) 2012 (S.R. 2012 No. 438)
- The Child Support (Management of Payments and Arrears) (Amendment) Regulations (Northern Ireland) 2012 (S.R. 2012 No. 439)
- The Child Maintenance (2008 Act) (Commencement No. 10 and Transitional Provisions) Order (Northern Ireland) 2012 (S.R. 2012 No. 440 (C. 45))
- The Strangford Lough (Sea Fishing Exclusion Zones) Regulations (Northern Ireland) 2012 (S.R. 2012 No. 441)
- The Water Framework Directive (Priority Substances and Classification) (Amendment) Regulations (Northern Ireland) 2012 (S.R. 2012 No. 442)
- General Register Office (Fees) Order (Northern Ireland) 2012 (S.R. 2012 No. 443)
- The Education (Levels of Progression for Key Stages 1, 2 and 3) Order (Northern Ireland) 2012 (S.R. 2012 No. 444)
- Air Passenger Duty (2012 Act) (Commencement) Order (Northern Ireland) 2012 (S.R. 2012 No. 445 (C. 46))
- The Police Act 1997 (Criminal Records) (Amendment No. 3) Regulations (Northern Ireland) 2012 (S.R. 2012 No. 446)
- The Parking and Waiting Restrictions (Ballymena) (Amendment) Order (Northern Ireland) 2012 (S.R. 2012 No. 447)
- The Greystone Road, Limavady (Abandonment) Order (Northern Ireland) 2012 (S.R. 2012 No. 448)
- The Justice (2011 Act) (Commencement No. 5) Order (Northern Ireland) 2012 (S.R. 2012 No. 449 (C. 47))
- The Health and Safety (Miscellaneous Revocations) Regulations (Northern Ireland) 2012 (S.R. 2012 No. 450)
- The Motor Vehicles (Driving Licences) (Amendment No. 3) Regulations (Northern Ireland) 2012 (S.R. 2012 No. 451)
- The Common Agricultural Policy Single Payment and Support Schemes (Cross Compliance) (Amendment) Regulations (Northern Ireland) 2012 (S.R. 2012 No. 452)
- The Pollution Prevention and Control (Industrial Emissions) Regulations (Northern Ireland) 2012 (S.R. 2012 No. 453)
- Gas (Meter Testing and Stamping) Regulations (Northern Ireland) 2012 (S.R. 2012 No. 454)
- Superannuation (Victims and Survivors Service Limited) Order (Northern Ireland) 2012 (S.R. 2012 No. 455)
- The Less Favoured Area Compensatory Allowances Regulations (Northern Ireland) 2012 (S.R. 2012 No. 456)
- The Common Agricultural Policy Support Schemes (Review of Decisions) (Amendment) Regulations (Northern Ireland) 2012 (S.R. 2012 No. 457)
- The Foyle Area and Carlingford Area (Angling) (Amendment) Regulations 2012 (S.R. 2012 No. 458)
- The Foyle Area (Control of Fishing) (Amendment) Regulations 2012 (S.R. 2012 No. 459)
- The Waiting Restrictions (Dungannon) (Amendment No. 2) Order (Northern Ireland) 2012 (S.R. 2012 No. 460)
- The Parking and Waiting Restrictions (Ballymena) (Amendment No. 2) Order (Northern Ireland) 2012 (S.R. 2012 No. 461)
- The Sex Discrimination Order 1976 (Amendment) Regulations (Northern Ireland) 2012 (S.R. 2012 No. 462)
