= List of statutory rules of Northern Ireland, 1997 =

This is an incomplete list of statutory rules of Northern Ireland in 1997.

== 1-100 ==
- Buses (Section 10B Permits) (Amendment) Regulations (Northern Ireland) 1997 (S.R. 1997 No. 1)
- Temporary Speed Limit (Upper Ballinderry, Lisburn) Order (Northern Ireland) 1997 (S.R. 1997 No. 2)
- Social Security (Non-Dependent Deductions) Regulations (Northern Ireland) 1997 (S.R. 1997 No. 3)
- Housing Benefit (General) (Amendment) Regulations (Northern Ireland) 1997 (S.R. 1997 No. 4)
- Temporary Speed Limit (Lisnevenagh Road, Route A26, Kells) Order (Northern Ireland) 1997 (S.R. 1997 No. 5)
- Rates (Making and Levying of Different Rates) Regulations (Northern Ireland) 1997 (S.R. 1997 No. 6)
- Occupational Pension Schemes (Contracting-out) (Transitional) Regulations (Northern Ireland) 1997 (S.R. 1997 No. 7)
- Occupational Pension Schemes (Indexation) Regulations (Northern Ireland) 1997 (S.R. 1997 No. 8)
- Parking Places on Roads (Amendment) Order (Northern Ireland) 1997 (S.R. 1997 No. 9)
- Plant Health (Wood and Bark) Order (Northern Ireland) 1997 (S.R. 1997 No. 11)
- Ports (Levy on Disposals of Land, etc.) Order (Northern Ireland) 1997 (S.R. 1997 No. 12)
- Hill Livestock (Compensatory Allowances) (Amendment) Regulations (Northern Ireland) 1997 (S.R. 1997 No. 13)
- County Court (Amendment) Rules (Northern Ireland) 1997 (S.R. 1997 No. 17)
- Registration of Clubs (Certificate of Registration) Regulations (Northern Ireland) 1997 (S.R. 1997 No. 18)
- Licensing (Form of Children's Certificate) Regulations (Northern Ireland) 1997 (S.R. 1997 No. 19)
- Licensing (Form of Licence) Regulations (Northern Ireland) 1997 (S.R. 1997 No. 20)
- Income-Related Benefits and Jobseeker's Allowance (Miscellaneous Amendments) Regulations (Northern Ireland) 1997 (S.R. 1997 No. 22)
- Registered Rents (Increase) Order (Northern Ireland) 1997 (S.R. 1997 No. 23)
- Education (Assessment Arrangements for Key Stage 3) (Amendment) Order (Northern Ireland) 1997 (S.R. 1997 No. 24)
- One-Way Traffic (Whitehead) Order (Northern Ireland) 1997 (S.R. 1997 No. 25)
- Licensing (Requirements for Conference Centre) Regulations (Northern Ireland) 1997 (S.R. 1997 No. 26)
- Registration (Land and Deeds) (1992 Order) (Commencement No. 3) Order (Northern Ireland) 1997 (S.R. 1997 No. 27)
- Registration of Deeds Regulations (Northern Ireland) 1997 (S.R. 1997 No. 28)
- Health and Safety (Petroleum-Spirit Licence Fees) Regulations (Northern Ireland) 1997 (S.R. 1997 No. 29)
- Social Security (Contracting-out and Qualifying Earnings Factor) Regulations (Northern Ireland) 1997 (S.R. 1997 No. 31)
- Proceeds of Crime (Northern Ireland) Order 1996 (Amendment) Order 1997 (S.R. 1997 No. 32)
- Prohibition of Right-Hand Turn (Portadown) (Amendment) Order (Northern Ireland) 1997 (S.R. 1997 No. 33)
- One-Way Traffic (Strabane) (Amendment) Order (Northern Ireland) 1997 (S.R. 1997 No. 34)
- Artificial Insemination of Cattle (Amendment) Regulations (Northern Ireland) 1997 (S.R. 1997 No. 35)
- Industrial Tribunals (1996 Order) (Commencement) Order (Northern Ireland) 1997 (S.R. 1997 No. 36)
- Pensions (1995 Order) (Commencement No. 6) Order (Northern Ireland) 1997 (S.R. 1997 No. 37)
- Personal and Occupational Pension Schemes (Pensions Ombudsman) (Procedure) (Amendment) Rules (Northern Ireland) 1997 (S.R. 1997 No. 38)
- Personal and Occupational Pension Schemes (Pensions Ombudsman) Regulations (Northern Ireland) 1997 (S.R. 1997 No. 39)
- Occupational Pension Schemes (Requirement to obtain Audited Accounts and a Statement from the Auditor) Regulations (Northern Ireland) 1997 (S.R. 1997 No. 40)
- Airports (Designation) (Facilities for Consultation) Order (Northern Ireland) 1997 (S.R. 1997 No. 41)
- Royal Ulster Constabulary (Discipline and Disciplinary Appeals) (Amendment) Regulations 1997 (S.R. 1997 No. 42)
- Royal Ulster Constabulary Reserve (Part-time) (Discipline and Disciplinary Appeals) (Amendment) Regulations 1997 (S.R. 1997 No. 43)
- Industrial Training (Construction Board) (Amendment) Order (Northern Ireland) 1997 (S.R. 1997 No. 45)
- Industrial Training Levy (Construction Industry) (Amendment) Order (Northern Ireland) 1997 (S.R. 1997 No. 46)
- Rates Regulations (Northern Ireland) 1997 (S.R. 1997 No. 49)
- Rates (Making and Levying of Different Rates) (No. 2) Regulations (Northern Ireland) 1997 (S.R. 1997 No. 50)
- Employer's Liability (Compulsory Insurance) Exemption (Amendment) Regulations (Northern Ireland) 1997 (S.R. 1997 No. 51)
- Waste Collection and Disposal (Amendment) Regulations (Northern Ireland) 1997 (S.R. 1997 No. 52)
- Suckler Cow Premium (Amendment) Regulations (Northern Ireland) 1997 (S.R. 1997 No. 53)
- Prohibition of Traffic (Causeway End Road, Unclassified No. 41, Lisburn) Order (Northern Ireland) 1997 (S.R. 1997 No. 54)
- Roads (Speed Limit) Order (Northern Ireland) 1997 (S.R. 1997 No. 55)
- Personal and Occupational Pension Schemes (Protected Rights) Regulations (Northern Ireland) 1997 (S.R. 1997 No. 56)
- Road Transport Licensing (Fees) Regulations (Northern Ireland) 1997 (S.R. 1997 No. 57)
- Roads (Speed Limit) (No. 2) Order (Northern Ireland) 1997 (S.R. 1997 No. 58)
- County Court (Amendment No. 2) Rules (Northern Ireland) 1997 (S.R. 1997 No. 61)
- Magistrates' Courts (Licensing) Rules (Northern Ireland) 1997 (S.R. 1997 No. 62)
- Magistrates' Courts (Registration of Clubs) Rules (Northern Ireland) 1997 (S.R. 1997 No. 63)
- Level Crossing (Meigh) Order (Northern Ireland) 1997 (S.R. 1997 No. 65)
- Level Crossing (Lurgan (Bells Row)) Order (Northern Ireland) 1997 (S.R. 1997 No. 66)
- Level Crossing (Lurgan (Lake Street)) Order (Northern Ireland) 1997 (S.R. 1997 No. 67)
- Level Crossing (Poyntzpass) Order (Northern Ireland) 1997 (S.R. 1997 No. 68)
- Social Security (Disability Living Allowance and Attendance Allowance) (Amendment) Regulations (Northern Ireland) 1997 (S.R. 1997 No. 69)
- Rules of the Supreme Court (Northern Ireland) (Amendment) 1997 (S.R. 1997 No. 70)
- Tribunal (Amendment) Regulations (Northern Ireland) 1997 (S.R. 1997 No. 71)
- Business Tenancies (Notices) Regulations (Northern Ireland) 1997 (S.R. 1997 No. 72)
- Lands Tribunal (Amendment) Rules (Northern Ireland) 1997 (S.R. 1997 No. 73)
- Business Tenancies (1996 Order) (Commencement) Order (Northern Ireland) 1997 (S.R. 1997 No. 74)
- Licensing (Register of Licences) Regulations (Northern Ireland) 1997 (S.R. 1997 No. 75)
- Registration of Clubs (Required Information) Regulations (Northern Ireland) 1997 (S.R. 1997 No. 76)
- Registration of Clubs (Display of Notice) Regulation (Northern Ireland) 1997 (S.R. 1997 No. 77)
- Registration of Clubs (Certificate of Registration) Regulations (Northern Ireland) 1997 (S.R. 1997 No. 78)
- Assistance for Minor Works to Dwellings (Amendment) Regulations (Northern Ireland) 1997 (S.R. 1997 No. 79)
- Rates (Industrial Hereditaments) Order (Northern Ireland) 1997 (S.R. 1997 No. 80)
- Valuation for Rating (Decapitalisation Rate) Regulations (Northern Ireland) 1997 (S.R. 1997 No. 81)
- Valuation (Telecommunications) Regulations (Northern Ireland) 1997 (S.R. 1997 No. 82)
- Valuation for Rating (Docks) Order (Northern Ireland) 1997 (S.R. 1997 No. 83)
- Valuation for Rating (Plant and Machinery) Order (Northern Ireland) 1997 (S.R. 1997 No. 84)
- Roads (Speed Limit) (No. 3) Order (Northern Ireland) 1997 (S.R. 1997 No. 85)
- Prison and Young Offenders Centre (Amendment) Rules (Northern Ireland) 1997 (S.R. 1997 No. 86)
- Animals and Animal Products (Import and Export) (Amendment) Regulations (Northern Ireland) 1997 (S.R. 1997 No. 87)
- Conservation of Scallops Regulations (Northern Ireland) 1997 (S.R. 1997 No. 89)
- Legal Aid (Financial Conditions) Regulations (Northern Ireland) 1997 (S.R. 1997 No. 90)
- Legal Advice and Assistance (Amendment) Regulations (Northern Ireland) 1997 (S.R. 1997 No. 91)
- Legal Advice and Assistance (Financial Conditions) Regulations (Northern Ireland) 1997 (S.R. 1997 No. 92)
- Licensing (Requirements for Accommodation for Guests) (Revocation) Regulations (Northern Ireland) 1997 (S.R. 1997 No. 93)
- Occupational Pension Schemes (Scheme Administration) Regulations (Northern Ireland) 1997 (S.R. 1997 No. 94)
- Occupational Pension Schemes (Mixed Benefit Contracted-out Schemes) Regulations (Northern Ireland) 1997 (S.R. 1997 No. 95)
- Occupational Pension Schemes (Payments to Employers) Regulations (Northern Ireland) 1997 (S.R. 1997 No. 96)
- Occupational Pension Schemes (Modification of Schemes) Regulations (Northern Ireland) 1997 (S.R. 1997 No. 97)
- Occupational Pension Schemes (Disclosure of Information) Regulations (Northern Ireland) 1997 (S.R. 1997 No. 98)
- Occupational Pension Schemes (Independent Trustee) Regulations (Northern Ireland) 1997 (S.R. 1997 No. 99)
- Social Security (Contributions) (Amendment) Regulations (Northern Ireland) 1997 (S.R. 1997 No. 100)

== 101-200 ==
- Health and Personal Social Services (Superannuation) (Provision of Information and Administrative Expenses etc.) Regulations (Northern Ireland) 1997 (S.R. 1997 No. 101)
- Register of Occupational and Personal Pension Schemes Regulations (Northern Ireland) 1997 (S.R. 1997 No. 102)
- Planning (Fees) (Amendment) Regulations (Northern Ireland) 1997 (S.R. 1997 No. 104)
- Guaranteed Minimum Pensions Increase Order (Northern Ireland) 1997 (S.R. 1997 No. 105)
- Railways (Rateable Value) Order (Northern Ireland) 1997 (S.R. 1997 No. 106)
- Rates (Transitional Relief) Order (Northern Ireland) 1997 (S.R. 1997 No. 107)
- Eggs (Marketing Standards) (Amendment) Regulations (Northern Ireland) 1997 (S.R. 1997 No. 108)
- Motor Vehicles (Authorisation of Special Types) Order (Northern Ireland) 1997 (S.R. 1997 No. 109)
- Plant Health (Amendment) Order (Northern Ireland) 1997 (S.R. 1997 No. 110)
- Dental Charges (Amendment) Regulations (Northern Ireland) 1997 (S.R. 1997 No. 111)
- Social Security (Incapacity for Work) (General) (Amendment) Regulations (Northern Ireland) 1997 (S.R. 1997 No. 112)
- Social Security Benefits Up-rating Order (Northern Ireland) 1997 (S.R. 1997 No. 113)
- Social Security (Contributions) (Re-rating and Northern Ireland National Insurance Fund Payments) Order (Northern Ireland) 1997 (S.R. 1997 No. 114)
- Rates (Regional Rates) Order (Northern Ireland) 1997 (S.R. 1997 No. 115)
- Social Security (Contributions) (Amendment No. 2) Regulations (Northern Ireland) 1997 (S.R. 1997 No. 116)
- Health and Personal Social Services (Disciplinary Procedures) (Amendment) Regulations (Northern Ireland) 1997 (S.R. 1997 No. 117)
- Valuation (Electricity) Order (Northern Ireland) 1997 (S.R. 1997 No. 118)
- Rates (Restriction on Amount Recoverable) Order (Northern Ireland) 1997 (S.R. 1997 No. 119)
- Statutory Maternity Pay (Compensation of Employers) (Amendment) Regulations (Northern Ireland) 1997 (S.R. 1997 No. 120)
- Social Security (Industrial Injuries) (Dependency) (Permitted Earnings Limits) Order (Northern Ireland) 1997 (S.R. 1997 No. 121)
- Social Security Benefits Up-rating Regulations (Northern Ireland) 1997 (S.R. 1997 No. 122)
- Housing Benefit (General) (Amendment No. 2) Regulations (Northern Ireland) 1997 (S.R. 1997 No. 123)
- Pensions Increase (Review) Order (Northern Ireland) 1997 (S.R. 1997 No. 124)
- Charges for Drugs and Appliances (Amendment) Regulations (Northern Ireland) 1997 (S.R. 1997 No. 125)
- Child Maintenance Bonus (Great Britain Reciprocal Arrangements) Regulations (Northern Ireland) 1997 (S.R. 1997 No. 126)
- Housing Benefit (General) (Amendment No. 3) Regulations (Northern Ireland) 1997 (S.R. 1997 No. 127)
- Criminal Procedure and Investigations (1996 Act) (Commencement) Order (Northern Ireland) 1997 (S.R. 1997 No. 129)
- Social Security (Miscellaneous Amendments) Regulations (Northern Ireland) 1997 (S.R. 1997 No. 130)
- Personal Social Services (Direct Payments) Regulations (Northern Ireland) 1997 (S.R. 1997 No. 131)
- Health and Social Services Trusts (Exercise of Functions) (Amendment) Regulations (Northern Ireland) 1997 (S.R. 1997 No. 132)
- Personal Social Services (Direct Payments) (1996 Order) (Commencement) Order (Northern Ireland) 1997 (S.R. 1997 No. 133)
- Pensions (1995 Order) (Commencement No. 7) Order (Northern Ireland) 1997 (S.R. 1997 No. 136)
- Local Government (Superannuation) (Milk Marketing Board for Northern Ireland) Regulations (Northern Ireland) 1997 (S.R. 1997 No. 137)
- Social Security (Jobseeker's Allowance and Mariners' Benefits) (Miscellaneous Amendments) Regulations (Northern Ireland) 1997 (S.R. 1997 No. 138)
- Personal Pension Schemes (Appropriate Schemes) Regulations (Northern Ireland) 1997 (S.R. 1997 No. 139)
- Occupational and Personal Pension Schemes (Contracting-out etc.: Review of Determinations) Regulations (Northern Ireland) 1997 (S.R. 1997 No. 140)
- Occupational Pension Schemes (Pensions Compensation Provisions) Regulations (Northern Ireland) 1997 (S.R. 1997 No. 141)
- Occupational and Personal Pension Schemes (Levy) Regulations (Northern Ireland) 1997 (S.R. 1997 No. 142)
- Occupational Pension Schemes (Prohibition of Trustees) Regulations (Northern Ireland) 1997 (S.R. 1997 No. 143)
- Revaluation (Consequential Provisions) Order (Northern Ireland) 1997 (S.R. 1997 No. 144)
- Workmen's Compensation (Supplementation) (Amendment) Regulations (Northern Ireland) 1997 (S.R. 1997 No. 145)
- Temporary Speed Limit (Belfast) Order (Northern Ireland) 1997 (S.R. 1997 No. 146)
- Health and Personal Social Services (Assessment of Resources) (Amendment) Regulations (Northern Ireland) 1997 (S.R. 1997 No. 147)
- Education (Assessment Arrangements for Key Stage 3) (Amendment No. 2) Order (Northern Ireland) 1997 (S.R. 1997 No. 148)
- Health and Safety (Repeals and Modifications) Regulations (Northern Ireland) 1997 (S.R. 1997 No. 149)
- Income-Related Benefits (Amendment) Regulations (Northern Ireland) 1997 (S.R. 1997 No. 152)
- Occupational Pension Schemes (Assignment, Forfeiture, Bankruptcy etc.) Regulations (Northern Ireland) 1997 (S.R. 1997 No. 153)
- Lobster (Conservation of Stocks) Regulations (Northern Ireland) 1997 (S.R. 1997 No. 154)
- Social Security (Social Fund and Claims and Payments) (Miscellaneous Amendments) Regulations (Northern Ireland) 1997 (S.R. 1997 No. 155)
- Social Security (Miscellaneous Amendments No. 2) Regulations (Northern Ireland) 1997 (S.R. 1997 No. 156)
- Workmen's Compensation (Supplementation) (Amendment No. 2) Regulations (Northern Ireland) 1997 (S.R. 1997 No. 157)
- Social Security (Industrial Injuries) (Miscellaneous Amendments) Regulations (Northern Ireland) 1997 (S.R. 1997 No. 158)
- Occupational Pension Schemes (Discharge of Liability) Regulations (Northern Ireland) 1997 (S.R. 1997 No. 159)
- Personal and Occupational Pension Schemes (Miscellaneous Amendments) Regulations (Northern Ireland) 1997 (S.R. 1997 No. 160)
- Occupational Pensions Regulatory Authority Regulations (Northern Ireland) 1997 (S.R. 1997 No. 161)
- Occupational Pension Schemes (Reference Scheme and Miscellaneous Amendments) Regulations (Northern Ireland) 1997 (S.R. 1997 No. 162)
- Social Security (Contributions) (Amendment No. 3) Regulations (Northern Ireland) 1997 (S.R. 1997 No. 163)
- Social Security (Adjudication) (Amendment) Regulations (Northern Ireland) 1997 (S.R. 1997 No. 164)
- Social Security (Income Support, Jobseeker's Allowance and Claims and Payments) (Miscellaneous Amendments) Regulations (Northern Ireland) 1997 (S.R. 1997 No. 165)
- Court Funds (Amendment) Rules (Northern Ireland) 1997 (S.R. 1997 No. 166)
- Occupational Pension Schemes (Age-related Payments) Regulations (Northern Ireland) 1997 (S.R. 1997 No. 167)
- Motor Vehicles (Construction and Use) (Amendment) Regulations (Northern Ireland) 1997 (S.R. 1997 No. 169)
- Housing Benefit (General) (Amendment No. 4) Regulations (Northern Ireland) 1997 (S.R. 1997 No. 170)
- Income Support (General) (Standard Interest Rate Amendment) Regulations (Northern Ireland) 1997 (S.R. 1997 No. 171)
- Animals (Records) Order (Northern Ireland) 1997 (S.R. 1997 No. 172)
- Identification and Movement of Sheep and Goats Order (Northern Ireland) 1997 (S.R. 1997 No. 173)
- Social Security (Incapacity for Work and Severe Disablement Allowance) (Amendment) Regulations (Northern Ireland) 1997 (S.R. 1997 No. 174)
- Supreme Court Fees (Amendment) Order (Northern Ireland) 1997 (S.R. 1997 No. 175)
- Supreme Court (Non-Contentious Probate) Fees (Amendment) Order (Northern Ireland) 1997 (S.R. 1997 No. 176)
- Family Proceedings Fees (Amendment) Order (Northern Ireland) 1997 (S.R. 1997 No. 177)
- County Court Fees (Amendment) Order (Northern Ireland) 1997 (S.R. 1997 No. 178)
- Magistrates' Courts Fees (Amendment) Order (Northern Ireland) 1997 (S.R. 1997 No. 179)
- Social Security (Contributions) (Amendment No. 4) Regulations (Northern Ireland) 1997 (S.R. 1997 No. 180)
- Diseases of Animals (Modification) Order (Northern Ireland) 1997 (S.R. 1997 No. 181)
- Pharmaceutical Services (1992 Order) (Commencement) Order (Northern Ireland) 1997 (S.R. 1997 No. 182)
- Social Security (Jamaica) Order (Northern Ireland) 1997 (S.R. 1997 No. 183)
- Health and Personal Social Services (Fund-holding Practices) (Amendment) Regulations (Northern Ireland) 1997 (S.R. 1997 No. 184)
- Travelling Expenses and Remission of Charges (Amendment) Regulations (Northern Ireland) 1997 (S.R. 1997 No. 185)
- Health and Social Services Trusts (Originating Capital Debt) Order (Northern Ireland) 1997 (S.R. 1997 No. 186)
- Curriculum (Programmes of Study in Economics, Political Studies and Social and Environmental Studies at Key Stage 4) Order (Northern Ireland) 1997 (S.R. 1997 No. 187)
- Education Reform (1989 Order) (Commencement No. 8) Order (Northern Ireland) 1997 (S.R. 1997 No. 188)
- Curriculum (Complaints Tribunals) (Amendment) Regulations (Northern Ireland) 1997 (S.R. 1997 No. 189)
- General Medical and Pharmaceutical Services (Amendment) Regulations (Northern Ireland) 1997 (S.R. 1997 No. 190)
- Optical Charges and Payments Regulations (Northern Ireland) 1997 (S.R. 1997 No. 191)
- Pensions (1995 Order) (Commencement No. 8) Order (Northern Ireland) 1997 (S.R. 1997 No. 192)
- Pipelines Safety Regulations (Northern Ireland) 1997 (S.R. 1997 No. 193)
- Gas Safety (Installation and Use) Regulations (Northern Ireland) 1997 (S.R. 1997 No. 194)
- Gas Safety (Management) Regulations (Northern Ireland) 1997 (S.R. 1997 No. 195)
- Urban Clearways Order (Northern Ireland) 1997 (S.R. 1997 No. 197)
- Northern Ireland Disability Council Regulations (Northern Ireland) 1997 (S.R. 1997 No. 200)

== 201-300 ==
- Control of Traffic (Belfast) Order (Northern Ireland) 1997 (S.R. 1997 No. 201)
- Education (Assessment Arrangements for Key Stage 3) (Amendment No. 3) Order (Northern Ireland) 1997 (S.R. 1997 No. 203)
- Social Security Revaluation of Earnings Factors Order (Northern Ireland) 1997 (S.R. 1997 No. 204)
- Urban Clearway (Greystone Road, Route B95, Antrim) Order (Northern Ireland) 1997 (S.R. 1997 No. 205)
- Roads (Speed Limit) (No. 4) Order (Northern Ireland) 1997 (S.R. 1997 No. 206)
- One-Way Traffic (Belfast) (Amendment) Order (Northern Ireland) 1997 (S.R. 1997 No. 207)
- Bus Lanes (Malone Road, Belfast) Order (Northern Ireland) 1997 (S.R. 1997 No. 211)
- Parking Places on Roads Order (Northern Ireland) 1997 (S.R. 1997 No. 212)
- Infant Formula and Follow-on Formula (Amendment) Regulations (Northern Ireland) 1997 (S.R. 1997 No. 213)
- Street Works (1995 Order) (Commencement No. 2) Order (Northern Ireland) 1997 (S.R. 1997 No. 215)
- Health and Personal Social Services (Superannuation) (Amendment) Regulations (Northern Ireland) 1997 (S.R. 1997 No. 217)
- Fresh Meat (Import Conditions) Regulations (Northern Ireland) 1997 (S.R. 1997 No. 218)
- Measuring Equipment (Liquid Fuel by Road Tanker) (Amendment) Regulations (Northern Ireland) 1997 (S.R. 1997 No. 220)
- Newry and Mourne Health and Social Services Trust (Establishment) (Amendment) Order (Northern Ireland) 1997 (S.R. 1997 No. 221)
- Craigavon and Banbridge Community Health and Social Services Trust (Establishment) (Amendment) Order (Northern Ireland) 1997 (S.R. 1997 No. 222)
- Salaries (Assembly Ombudsman and Commissioner for Complaints) Order (Northern Ireland) 1997 (S.R. 1997 No. 224)
- Health and Safety (Medical Fees) Regulations (Northern Ireland) 1997 (S.R. 1997 No. 225)
- Animals (Scientific Procedures) Act 1986 (Appropriate Methods of Humane Killing) Order (Northern Ireland) 1997 (S.R. 1997 No. 226)
- Food Premises (Registration) (Amendment) Regulations (Northern Ireland) 1997 (S.R. 1997 No. 227)
- Health and Safety (Enforcing Authority) Regulations (Northern Ireland) 1997 (S.R. 1997 No. 229)
- Specified Bovine Material (Treatment and Disposal) Regulations (Northern Ireland) 1997 (S.R. 1997 No. 230)
- Specified Bovine Material Order (Northern Ireland) 1997 (S.R. 1997 No. 231)
- Education (Individual Pupils' Achievements) (Information) (Amendment) Regulations (Northern Ireland) 1997 (S.R. 1997 No. 232)
- Health and Safety (Miscellaneous Fees Amendment) Regulations (Northern Ireland) 1997 (S.R. 1997 No. 234)
- Public Order (Prescribed Form) Regulations (Northern Ireland) 1997 (S.R. 1997 No. 235)
- Health and Personal Social Services (Superannuation) (Provision of Information and Administrative Expenses etc.) (Amendment) Regulations (Northern Ireland) 1997 (S.R. 1997 No. 236)
- Seeds (Miscellaneous Amendments) Regulations (Northern Ireland) 1997 (S.R. 1997 No. 240)
- Driving Licences (Community Driving Licence) Regulations (Northern Ireland) 1997 (S.R. 1997 No. 241)
- Local Government (General Grant) Order (Northern Ireland) 1997 (S.R. 1997 No. 242)
- Pesticides (Maximum Residue Levels in Crops, Food and Feeding Stuffs) (National Limits) (Amendment) Regulations (Northern Ireland) 1997 (S.R. 1997 No. 243)
- Pesticides (Maximum Residue Levels in Crops, Food and Feeding Stuffs) (EEC Limits) (Amendment) Regulations (Northern Ireland) 1997 (S.R. 1997 No. 244)
- Plant Protection Products (Fees) (Amendment) Regulations (Northern Ireland) 1997 (S.R. 1997 No. 246)
- Carriage of Dangerous Goods (Classification, Packaging and Labelling) and Use of Transportable Pressure Receptacles Regulations (Northern Ireland) 1997 (S.R. 1997 No. 247)
- Carriage of Dangerous Goods by Road Regulations (Northern Ireland) 1997 (S.R. 1997 No. 248)
- Carriage of Dangerous Goods by Road (Driver Training) Regulations (Northern Ireland) 1997 (S.R. 1997 No. 249)
- New Aghalane Bridge Order (Northern Ireland) 1997 (S.R. 1997 No. 250)
- Open-Ended Investment Companies (Investment Companies with Variable Capital) Regulations (Northern Ireland) 1997 (S.R. 1997 No. 251)
- Welfare Foods (Amendment) Regulations (Northern Ireland) 1997 (S.R. 1997 No. 252)
- Road Traffic (1995 Order) (Commencement) Order (Northern Ireland) 1997 (S.R. 1997 No. 253)
- Protection of Water Against Agricultural Nitrate Pollution (Amendment) Regulations (Northern Ireland) 1997 (S.R. 1997 No. 256)
- Sweeteners in Food (Amendment) Regulations (Northern Ireland) 1997 (S.R. 1997 No. 257)
- Child Support Commissioners (Procedure) (Amendment) Regulations (Northern Ireland) 1997 (S.R. 1997 No. 258)
- Royal Ulster Constabulary Pensions (Amendment) Regulations 1997 (S.R. 1997 No. 259)
- Royal Ulster Constabulary Reserve (Full-time) Pensions (Amendment) Regulations 1997 (S.R. 1997 No. 260)
- Royal Ulster Constabulary Reserve (Part-time) Pensions Regulations 1997 (S.R. 1997 No. 261)
- Legal Aid in Criminal Proceedings (Costs) (Amendment) Rules (Northern Ireland) 1997 (S.R. 1997 No. 262)
- General Medical and Pharmaceutical Services (Amendment No. 2) Regulations (Northern Ireland) 1997 (S.R. 1997 No. 264)
- Rules of the Supreme Court (Northern Ireland) (Amendment No. 2) 1997 (S.R. 1997 No. 265)
- Crown Court (Criminal Procedure and Investigations Act 1996) (Tainted Acquittals) Rules (Northern Ireland) 1997 (S.R. 1997 No. 266)
- Criminal Justice (1996 Order) (Commencement No. 1) Order (Northern Ireland) 1997 (S.R. 1997 No. 267)
- Criminal Justice (Northern Ireland) Order 1996 (Offensive Weapons) (Exemption) Order (Northern Ireland) 1997 (S.R. 1997 No. 268)
- Deregulation (Model Appeal Provisions) Order (Northern Ireland) 1997 (S.R. 1997 No. 269)
- Proceeds of Crime (Countries and Territories designated under the Drug Trafficking Act 1994) Order (Northern Ireland) 1997 (S.R. 1997 No. 270)
- Register of Occupational and Personal Pension Schemes (Amendment) Regulations (Northern Ireland) 1997 (S.R. 1997 No. 271)
- Animals (Third Country Imports) (Charges) Regulations (Northern Ireland) 1997 (S.R. 1997 No. 272)
- Race Relations (1997 Order) (Commencement) Order (Northern Ireland) 1997 (S.R. 1997 No. 273)
- Divorce etc. (Pensions) (Amendment) Regulations (Northern Ireland) 1997 (S.R. 1997 No. 275)
- Licensing (Conditions for Mixed Trading) Regulations (Northern Ireland) 1997 (S.R. 1997 No. 277)
- Magistrates' Courts (Criminal Procedure and Investigations Act 1996) (Tainted Acquittals) Rules (Northern Ireland) 1997 (S.R. 1997 No. 278)
- Road Traffic Offenders (1996 Order) (Commencement No. 1) Order (Northern Ireland) 1997 (S.R. 1997 No. 279)
- Road Traffic Offenders (Prescribed Devices) Order (Northern Ireland) 1997 (S.R. 1997 No. 280)
- Protection from Harassment (1997 Order) (Commencement No. 1) Order (Northern Ireland) 1997 (S.R. 1997 No. 286)
- Court Funds (Amendment No. 2) Rules (Northern Ireland) 1997 (S.R. 1997 No. 295)
- Lands Tribunal (Salaries) Order (Northern Ireland) 1997 (S.R. 1997 No. 296)
- Environmentally Sensitive Areas (Antrim Coast, Glens and Rathlin) Designation (Amendment) Order (Northern Ireland) 1997 (S.R. 1997 No. 297)
- Environmentally Sensitive Areas (Slieve Gullion) Designation (Amendment) Order (Northern Ireland) 1997 (S.R. 1997 No. 298)
- Environmentally Sensitive Areas (Mourne Mountains and Slieve Croob) Designation (Amendment) Order (Northern Ireland) 1997 (S.R. 1997 No. 299)
- Environmentally Sensitive Areas (West Fermanagh and Erne Lakeland) Designation (Amendment) Order (Northern Ireland) 1997 (S.R. 1997 No. 300)

== 301-400 ==
- Environmentally Sensitive Areas (Sperrins) Designation (Amendment) Order (Northern Ireland) 1997 (S.R. 1997 No. 301)
- Road Vehicles Lighting (Amendment) Regulations (Northern Ireland) 1997 (S.R. 1997 No. 305)
- Salaries (Comptroller and Auditor General) Order (Northern Ireland) 1997 (S.R. 1997 No. 306)
- Education (1996 Order) (Commencement No. 2) Order (Northern Ireland) 1997 (S.R. 1997 No. 307)
- Public Service Vehicles (Conditions of Fitness, Equipment and Use) (Amendment) Regulations (Northern Ireland) 1997 (S.R. 1997 No. 308)
- Teachers' (Eligibility) Regulations (Northern Ireland) 1997 (S.R. 1997 No. 312)
- Companies (Forms) (Amendment) Regulations (Northern Ireland) 1997 (S.R. 1997 No. 313)
- Companies (1986 Order) (Miscellaneous Accounting Amendments) Regulations (Northern Ireland) 1997 (S.R. 1997 No. 314)
- Special Educational Needs Tribunal Regulations (Northern Ireland) 1997 (S.R. 1997 No. 315)
- Social Security Administration (Fraud) (1997 Order) (Commencement No. 1) Order (Northern Ireland) 1997 (S.R. 1997 No. 316)
- Bovine Products (Production and Despatch) Regulations (Northern Ireland) 1997 (S.R. 1997 No. 319)
- Race Relations (Interest on Awards) Order (Northern Ireland) 1997 (S.R. 1997 No. 320)
- Race Relations (Formal Investigations) Regulations (Northern Ireland) 1997 (S.R. 1997 No. 321)
- Race Relations (Questions and Replies) Order (Northern Ireland) 1997 (S.R. 1997 No. 322)
- Fire Services (Appointments and Promotion) (Amendment) Regulations (Northern Ireland) 1997 (S.R. 1997 No. 324)
- Foyle Area (Control of Fishing) (Revocation) Regulations 1997 (S.R. 1997 No. 325)
- Game Birds Preservation Order (Northern Ireland) 1997 (S.R. 1997 No. 326)
- Education (Special Educational Needs) Regulations (Northern Ireland) 1997 (S.R. 1997 No. 327)
- Property (1997 Order) (Commencement No. 1) Order (Northern Ireland) 1997 (S.R. 1997 No. 328)
- Social Security (Miscellaneous Amendments No. 3) Regulations (Northern Ireland) 1997 (S.R. 1997 No. 330)
- Income-Related Benefits and Jobseeker's Allowance (Amendment) Regulations (Northern Ireland) 1997 (S.R. 1997 No. 331)
- Registration of Clubs (Accounts) Regulations (Northern Ireland) 1997 (S.R. 1997 No. 333)
- Road Traffic Offenders (1996 Order) (Commencement No. 2) Order (Northern Ireland) 1997 (S.R. 1997 No. 336)
- Contaminants in Food Regulations (Northern Ireland) 1997 (S.R. 1997 No. 338)
- Social Security (United States of America) Order (Northern Ireland) 1997 (S.R. 1997 No. 339)
- Miscellaneous Food Additives (Amendment) Regulations (Northern Ireland) 1997 (S.R. 1997 No. 340)
- Education (School Information and Prospectuses) (Amendment) Regulations (Northern Ireland) 1997 (S.R. 1997 No. 341)
- Legal Advice and Assistance (Amendment No. 2) Regulations (Northern Ireland) 1997 (S.R. 1997 No. 342)
- Legal Aid (Assessment of Resources) (Amendment) Regulations (Northern Ireland) 1997 (S.R. 1997 No. 343)
- Road Traffic Fixed Penalties (Enforcement of Fines) Regulations (Northern Ireland) 1997 (S.R. 1997 No. 344)
- Welfare of Animals (Transport) (Remedial Action and Cost Recovery) Regulations (Northern Ireland) 1997 (S.R. 1997 No. 345)
- Welfare of Animals (Transport) Order (Northern Ireland) 1997 (S.R. 1997 No. 346)
- Industrial Training Levy (Construction Industry) Orde (Northern Ireland) 1997 (S.R. 1997 No. 349)
- Education (Student Loans) Regulations (Northern Ireland) 1997 (S.R. 1997 No. 350)
- Habitat Improvement (Amendment) Regulations (Northern Ireland) 1997 (S.R. 1997 No. 351)
- Specified Diseases (Notification and Movement Restrictions) Order (Northern Ireland) 1997 (S.R. 1997 No. 352)
- Horse Racing (Charges on Bookmakers) Order (Northern Ireland) 1997 (S.R. 1997 No. 353)
- Social Security (Lone Parents) (Amendment) Regulations (Northern Ireland) 1997 (S.R. 1997 No. 354)
- Social Security (Attendance Allowance and Disability Living Allowance) (Miscellaneous Amendments) Regulations (Northern Ireland) 1997 (S.R. 1997 No. 355)
- Carriage of Dangerous Goods (Classification, Packaging and Labelling) and Use of Transportable Pressure Receptacles (Amendment) Regulations (Northern Ireland) 1997 (S.R. 1997 No. 360)
- Students Awards Regulations (Northern Ireland) 1997 (S.R. 1997 No. 361)
- Royal Ulster Constabulary (Amendment) Regulations 1997 (S.R. 1997 No. 362)
- Royal Ulster Constabulary Reserve (Full-time) (Appointment and Conditions of Service) (Amendment) Regulations 1997 (S.R. 1997 No. 363)
- Royal Ulster Constabulary Reserve (Part-time) (Appointment and Conditions of Service) (Amendment) Regulations 1997 (S.R. 1997 No. 364)
- Motor Hackney Carriages (Belfast) (Amendment) By-Laws (Northern Ireland) 1997 (S.R. 1997 No. 365)
- Noise Act 1996 (Commencement) Order (Northern Ireland) 1997 (S.R. 1997 No. 366)
- Certification Officer (Fees) Regulations (Northern Ireland) 1997 (S.R. 1997 No. 367)
- Road Traffic (Fixed Penalty) Order (Northern Ireland) 1997 (S.R. 1997 No. 368)
- Road Traffic (Fixed Penalty) (Offences) Order (Northern Ireland) 1997 (S.R. 1997 No. 369)
- Road Traffic Offenders (Appropriate Driving Test) Order (Northern Ireland) 1997 (S.R. 1997 No. 370)
- Motor Vehicles (Construction and Use) (Amendment No. 2) Regulations (Northern Ireland) 1997 (S.R. 1997 No. 371)
- Road Traffic Offenders (1996 Order) (Commencement No. 3) Order (Northern Ireland) 1997 (S.R. 1997 No. 372)
- Road Traffic (Courses for Drink-Drive Offenders) Regulations (Northern Ireland) 1997 (S.R. 1997 No. 373)
- Road Traffic Fixed Penalty (Procedure) Regulations (Northern Ireland) 1997 (S.R. 1997 No. 374)
- Motor Cars (Silence Zones) (Revocation) Regulations (Northern Ireland) 1997 (S.R. 1997 No. 375)
- Housing Benefit (General) (Amendment No. 5) Regulations (Northern Ireland) 1997 (S.R. 1997 No. 376)
- Housing Benefit (General) (Amendment No. 6) Regulations (Northern Ireland) 1997 (S.R. 1997 No. 377)
- Fertilisers (Amendment) Regulations (Northern Ireland) 1997 (S.R. 1997 No. 378)
- Bovines and Bovine Products (Despatch Prohibition and Production Restriction) Regulations (Northern Ireland) 1997 (S.R. 1997 No. 379)
- General Medical Services Regulations (Northern Ireland) 1997 (S.R. 1997 No. 380)
- Charges for Drugs and Appliances Regulations (Northern Ireland) 1997 (S.R. 1997 No. 382)
- Motor Vehicles (Driving Licences) (Amendment) Regulations (Northern Ireland) 1997 (S.R. 1997 No. 383)
- Employment (Miscellaneous Provisions) (1990 Order) (Commencement No. 2) Order (Northern Ireland) 1997 (S.R. 1997 No. 385)
- Health and Safety (Young Persons) Regulations (Northern Ireland) 1997 (S.R. 1997 No. 387)
- Further Education Teachers' (Eligibility) Regulations (Northern Ireland) 1997 (S.R. 1997 No. 388)
- Health and Personal Social Services (Superannuation) (Amendment No. 2) Regulations (Northern Ireland) 1997 (S.R. 1997 No. 390)
- Departments (Transfer of Functions) Order (Northern Ireland) 1997 (S.R. 1997 No. 391)
- Income Support (General) (Standard Interest Rate Amendment No. 2) Regulations (Northern Ireland) 1997 (S.R. 1997 No. 395)
- Transport of Animals and Poultry (Cleansing and Disinfection) Order (Northern Ireland) 1997 (S.R. 1997 No. 396)
- Plant Health (Amendment No. 2) Order (Northern Ireland) 1997 (S.R. 1997 No. 397)
- Chemicals (Hazard Information and Packaging for Supply) (Amendment) Regulations (Northern Ireland) 1997 (S.R. 1997 No. 398)
- Education (Assessment Arrangements for Key Stages 1 and 2) (Amendment) Order (Northern Ireland) 1997 (S.R. 1997 No. 399)
- Social Security (Recovery of Benefits) (1997 Order) (Commencement) Order (Northern Ireland) 1997 (S.R. 1997 No. 400)

== 401-500 ==
- Explosives (Fireworks) Regulations (Northern Ireland) 1997 (S.R. 1997 No. 401)
- Seed Potatoes (Amendment) Regulations (Northern Ireland) 1997 (S.R. 1997 No. 402)
- Proceeds of Crime (Enforcement of Confiscation Orders made in England and Wales or Scotland) Order (Northern Ireland) 1997 (S.R. 1997 No. 403)
- Pneumoconiosis, etc., (Workers' Compensation) (Payment of Claims) (Amendment) Regulations (Northern Ireland) 1997 (S.R. 1997 No. 409)
- Road Traffic Regulation (1997 Order) (Commencement No. 1) Order (Northern Ireland) 1997 (S.R. 1997 No. 410)
- Income-Related Benefits and Jobseeker's Allowance (Amendment No. 2) Regulations (Northern Ireland) 1997 (S.R. 1997 No. 412)
- Seeds (Fees) Regulations (Northern Ireland) 1997 (S.R. 1997 No. 413)
- Social Security (Claims and Payments and Adjudication) (Amendment) Regulations (Northern Ireland) 1997 (S.R. 1997 No. 417)
- Food (Pistachios from Iran) (Emergency Control) Order (Northern Ireland) 1997 (S.R. 1997 No. 421)
- Education (Assessment Arrangements for Key Stage 3) Order (Northern Ireland) 1997 (S.R. 1997 No. 422)
- Companies (Revision of Defective Accounts and Report) (Amendment) Regulations (Northern Ireland) 1997 (S.R. 1997 No. 423)
- Fisheries Byelaws (Northern Ireland) 1997 (S.R. 1997 No. 425)
- Child Support Commissioners (Procedure) (Amendment No. 2) Regulations (Northern Ireland) 1997 (S.R. 1997 No. 426)
- Social Security Commissioners Procedure (Amendment) Regulations (Northern Ireland) 1997 (S.R. 1997 No. 427)
- Magistrates' Courts (Amendment) Rules (Northern Ireland) 1997 (S.R. 1997 No. 428)
- Social Security (Recovery of Benefits) Regulations (Northern Ireland) 1997 (S.R. 1997 No. 429)
- Social Security (Recovery of Benefits) (Appeals) Regulations (Northern Ireland) 1997 (S.R. 1997 No. 430)
- Councillors (Travelling and Subsistence Allowances) (Amendment) Regulations (Northern Ireland) 1997 (S.R. 1997 No. 431)
- Processed Cereal-based Foods and Baby Foods for Infants and Young Children Regulations (Northern Ireland) 1997 (S.R. 1997 No. 432)
- Social Security (Miscellaneous Amendments No. 4) Regulations (Northern Ireland) 1997 (S.R. 1997 No. 435)
- Companies (1986 Order) (Accounts of Small and Medium-sized Companies and Minor Accounting Amendments) Regulations (Northern Ireland) 1997 (S.R. 1997 No. 436)
- Social Fund (Cold Weather Payments) (General) (Amendment) Regulations (Northern Ireland) 1997 (S.R. 1997 No. 437)
- Primary Schools (Admissions Criteria) Regulations (Northern Ireland) 1997 (S.R. 1997 No. 438)
- Secondary Schools (Admissions Criteria) Regulations (Northern Ireland) 1997 (S.R. 1997 No. 439)
- Travelling Expenses and Remission of Charges (Amendment No. 2) Regulations (Northern Ireland) 1997 (S.R. 1997 No. 440)
- National Board for Nursing, Midwifery and Health Visiting for Northern Ireland (Constitution and Administration) Amendment Order (Northern Ireland) 1997 (S.R. 1997 No. 441)
- Police (Property) Regulations (Northern Ireland) 1997 (S.R. 1997 No. 448)
- Social Security Administration (Fraud) (1997 Order) (Commencement No. 2) Order (Northern Ireland) 1997 (S.R. 1997 No. 449)
- Foods Intended for Use in Energy Restricted Diets for Weight Reduction Regulations (Northern Ireland) 1997 (S.R. 1997 No. 450)
- Eggs (Marketing Standards) (Amendment No. 2) Regulations (Northern Ireland) 1997 (S.R. 1997 No. 451)
- Housing Benefit (General) (Amendment No. 7) Regulations (Northern Ireland) 1997 (S.R. 1997 No. 452)
- Housing Benefit (Information from Landlords and Agents) Regulations (Northern Ireland) 1997 (S.R. 1997 No. 453)
- Housing Benefit (Recovery of Overpayments) Regulations (Northern Ireland) 1997 (S.R. 1997 No. 454)
- Reporting of Injuries, Diseases and Dangerous Occurrences Regulations (Northern Ireland) 1997 (S.R. 1997 No. 455)
- Housing Renovation etc. Grants (Reduction of Grant) Regulations (Northern Ireland) 1997 (S.R. 1997 No. 456)
- Commissioner for Complaints (1997 Amendment Order) (Commencement) Order (Northern Ireland) 1997 (S.R. 1997 No. 457)
- Optical Charges and Payments (Amendment) Regulations (Northern Ireland) 1997 (S.R. 1997 No. 458)
- Welfare Foods (Amendment) (No. 2) Regulations (Northern Ireland) 1997 (S.R. 1997 No. 461)
- Dogs (Licensing and Identification) (Amendment) Regulations (Northern Ireland) 1997 (S.R. 1997 No. 462)
- Eel Fishing (Licence Duties) Regulations (Northern Ireland) 1997 (S.R. 1997 No. 463)
- Royal Ulster Constabulary Pensions (Additional Voluntary Contributions) (Amendment) Regulations 1997 (S.R. 1997 No. 464)
- Transport of Animals and Poultry (Cleansing and Disinfection) (No. 2) Order (Northern Ireland) 1997 (S.R. 1997 No. 466)
- Motorways Traffic (Amendment) Regulations (Northern Ireland) 1997 (S.R. 1997 No. 468)
- Control of Pesticides (Amendment) Regulations (Northern Ireland) 1997 (S.R. 1997 No. 469)
- Plant Protection Products (Basic Conditions) Regulations (Northern Ireland) 1997 (S.R. 1997 No. 470)
- Plant Protection Products (Amendment) Regulations (Northern Ireland) 1997 (S.R. 1997 No. 471)
- Social Fund (Maternity and Funeral Expenses) (General) (Amendment) Regulations (Northern Ireland) 1997 (S.R. 1997 No. 472)
- Occupational Pension Schemes (Payments to Employers) (Amendment) Regulations (Northern Ireland) 1997 (S.R. 1997 No. 473)
- Carriage of Explosives by Road Regulations (Northern Ireland) 1997 (S.R. 1997 No. 474)
- Carriage of Explosives by Road (Driver Training) Regulations (Northern Ireland) 1997 (S.R. 1997 No. 475)
- Income Support (General) (Standard Interest Rate Amendment No. 3) Regulations (Northern Ireland) 1997 (S.R. 1997 No. 476)
- Arable Area Payments Regulations (Northern Ireland) 1997 (S.R. 1997 No. 477)
- Potatoes Originating in the Netherlands (Notification) Regulations (Northern Ireland) 1997 (S.R. 1997 No. 478)
- Judicial Pensions (Requisite Surviving Spouses' Benefits etc.) Order (Northern Ireland) 1997 (S.R. 1997 No. 479)
- Social Security Administration (Fraud) (1997 Order) (Commencement No. 3) Order (Northern Ireland) 1997 (S.R. 1997 No. 480)
- Building (Amendment) Regulations (Northern Ireland) 1997 (S.R. 1997 No. 481)
- Building (Prescribed Fees) Regulations (Northern Ireland) 1997 (S.R. 1997 No. 482)
- Social Security (National Insurance Number Information: Exemption) Regulations (Northern Ireland) 1997 (S.R. 1997 No. 483)
- Jobseeker's Allowance (Amendment) Regulations (Northern Ireland) 1997 (S.R. 1997 No. 484)
- Sheep Annual Premium (Amendment) Regulations (Northern Ireland) 1997 (S.R. 1997 No. 485)
- Hill Livestock (Compensatory Allowances) (Amendment) Regulations (Northern Ireland) 1997 (S.R. 1997 No. 486)
- Surface Waters (Fishlife) (Classification) Regulations (Northern Ireland) 1997 (S.R. 1997 No. 488)
- Surface Waters (Shellfish) (Classification) Regulations (Northern Ireland) 1997 (S.R. 1997 No. 489)
- Food Safety (Enforcement) Order (Northern Ireland) 1997 (S.R. 1997 No. 492)
- Fresh Meat (Hygiene and Inspection) Regulations (Northern Ireland) 1997 (S.R. 1997 No. 493)
- Meat Products (Hygiene) Regulations (Northern Ireland) 1997 (S.R. 1997 No. 494)
- Minced Meat and Meat Preparations (Hygiene) Regulations (Northern Ireland) 1997 (S.R. 1997 No. 495)
- Wild Game Meat (Hygiene and Inspection) Regulations (Northern Ireland) 1997 (S.R. 1997 No. 496)
- Court Funds (Amendment No. 3) Rules (Northern Ireland) 1997 (S.R. 1997 No. 497)
- Court Funds (Amendment No. 3) Rules (Northern Ireland) 1997 (S.R. 1997 No. 499)
- Companies (1986 Order) (Audit Exemption) (Amendment) Regulations (Northern Ireland) 1997 (S.R. 1997 No. 500)

== 501-600 ==
- Companies (1986 Order) (Directors' Report) (Statement of Payment Practice) Regulations (Northern Ireland) 1997 (S.R. 1997 No. 501)
- Fair Employment (Specification of Public Authorities) (Amendment) Order (Northern Ireland) 1997 (S.R. 1997 No. 504)
- Plant Protection Products (Amendment) (No. 2) Regulations (Northern Ireland) 1997 (S.R. 1997 No. 507)
- Social Security Administration (Fraud) (1997 Order) (Commencement No. 4) Order (Northern Ireland) 1997 (S.R. 1997 No. 508)
- Fisheries (Licence Duties) Byelaws (Northern Ireland) 1997 (S.R. 1997 No. 509)
- Occupational Pensions (Revaluation) Order (Northern Ireland) 1997 (S.R. 1997 No. 511)
- Social Security (Penalty Notice) Regulations (Northern Ireland) 1997 (S.R. 1997 No. 514)
- Income-Related Benefits (Miscellaneous Amendments) Regulations (Northern Ireland) 1997 (S.R. 1997 No. 515)
- Insolvent Companies (Reports on Conduct of Directors) Rules (Northern Ireland) 1997 (S.R. 1997 No. 516)
- Motor Vehicles (Construction and Use) (Amendment No. 3) Regulations (Northern Ireland) 1997 (S.R. 1997 No. 518)
- Crown Court (Criminal Procedure and Investigations Act 1996) (Confidentiality) Rules (Northern Ireland) 1997 (S.R. 1997 No. 519)
- Crown Court (Criminal Procedure and Investigations Act 1996) (Disclosure) Rules (Northern Ireland) 1997 (S.R. 1997 No. 520)
- Deseasonalisation Premium (Protection of Payments) (Amendment) Regulations (Northern Ireland) 1997 (S.R. 1997 No. 521)
- Local Government (Competition in Functional Work) (Amendment) Regulations (Northern Ireland) 1997 (S.R. 1997 No. 522)
- Criminal Justice (1996 Order) (Commencement No. 2) Order (Northern Ireland) 1997 (S.R. 1997 No. 523)
- Health Services (Primary Care) (1997 Order) (Commencement No. 1) Order (Northern Ireland) 1997 (S.R. 1997 No. 524)
- Section 2 (C.1) of the Petroleum Act 1987 (Modification) Regulations (Northern Ireland) 1997 (S.R. 1997 No. 528)
- Magistrates' Courts (Amendment No. 2) Rules (Northern Ireland) 1997 (S.R. 1997 No. 529)
- Magistrates' Courts (Children and Young Persons) (Amendment) Rules (Northern Ireland) 1997 (S.R. 1997 No. 530)
- Magistrates' Courts (Criminal Procedure and Investigations Act 1996) (Disclosure) Rules (Northern Ireland) 1997 (S.R. 1997 No. 531)
- Magistrates' Courts (Criminal Procedure and Investigations Act 1996) (Confidentiality) Rules (Northern Ireland) 1997 (S.R. 1997 No. 532)
- Magistrates' Courts (Advance Notice of Expert Evidence) Rules (Northern Ireland) 1997 (S.R. 1997 No. 533)
- Genetically Modified Organisms (Deliberate Release and Risk Assessment) (Amendment) Regulations (Northern Ireland) 1997 (S.R. 1997 No. 534)
- Magistrates' Courts (Domestic Proceedings) (Amendment) Rules (Northern Ireland) 1997 (S.R. 1997 No. 538)
- Beef Bones Regulations (Northern Ireland) 1997 (S.R. 1997 No. 540)
- Social Security (Amendment) (New Deal) Regulations (Northern Ireland) 1997 (S.R. 1997 No. 541)
- Rules of the Supreme Court (Northern Ireland) (Amendment No. 3) 1997 (S.R. 1997 No. 543)
- Personal and Occupational Pension Schemes (Miscellaneous Amendments No. 2) Regulations (Northern Ireland) 1997 (S.R. 1997 No. 544)
- Company Accounts (Disclosure of Directors' Emoluments) Regulations (Northern Ireland) 1997 (S.R. 1997 No. 545)
- Pharmaceutical Services (Amendment) Regulations (Northern Ireland) 1997 (S.R. 1997 No. 547)
- Zoonoses Order (Northern Ireland) 1997 (S.R. 1997 No. 548)
- Specified Risk Material Order (Northern Ireland) 1997 (S.R. 1997 No. 551)
- Specified Risk Material Regulations (Northern Ireland) 1997 (S.R. 1997 No. 552)
- Bovine Spongiform Encephalopathy Order (Northern Ireland) 1997 (S.R. 1997 No. 553)
- Social Security (Claims and Payments) (Amendment) Regulations (Northern Ireland) 1997 (S.R. 1997 No. 554)
- Construction (Use of Explosives) Regulations (Northern Ireland) 1997 (S.R. 1997 No. 555)
