= List of statutory rules and orders of Northern Ireland, 1946 =

This is an incomplete list of statutory rules and orders of Northern Ireland during 1922. Statutory rules and orders were the predecessor of statutory rules and they formed the secondary legislation of Northern Ireland between 1922 and 1973.

Number	Title
No. 1	
No. 2	The Rate of Payment to Ministry of Commerce Order (Northern Ireland) 1946
No. 3	The Coal Supply (Temporary Provisions) Amendment (No. 9) Order (Northern Ireland) 1946
No. 4	The Secondary Teachers (Salaries and Allowances) Regulations (Northern Ireland) 1946
No. 5	The Public Elementary Schools (Salaries and Allowances) Regulations (Northern Ireland) 1946
No. 6	The Parliamentary Elections (Returning Officers Charges) Regulations (Northern Ireland) 1946
No. 7	
No. 8	The Parliamentary Grant (Education Authorities) Regulations (Northern Ireland) 1946
No. 9	The Emergency Powers (Defence) Acquisition and Disposal of Motor Vehicles (Revocation) Order (Northern Ireland) 1946
No. 10	The Local Authorities (Qualification of Officers) Regulations (Northern Ireland) 1946
No. 11	The Petty Sessions Districts and Times Order (Northern Ireland) 1946
No. 12	
No. 13	The Grass Seeds and Fertilisers General Order (Northern Ireland) 1946
No. 14	The Disabled Persons (Standard Percentage) Order (Northern Ireland) 1946
No. 15	The Technical Teachers (Salaries and Allowances) Regulations (Northern Ireland) 1946
No. 16 & 17	
No. 18	The Emergency Powers (Defence) (Carriage of Workers) (Revocation) Order (Northern Ireland) 1946
No. 19 & 20	
No. 21	The Electoral Register (Postponement of Publication) Order (Northern Ireland) 1946
No. 22	The Road Vehicles Lighting (Special Exemption) (Revocation) Order (Northern Ireland) 1946
No. 23	The Family Allowances (Making of Claims and Payments) Regulations (Northern Ireland) 1946
No. 24	The Family Allowances (References) Regulations (Northern Ireland) 1946
No. 25	The Family Allowances (Qualifications) Regulations (Northern Ireland) 1946
No. 26	The Public Health (Tuberculosis) Regulations (Northern Ireland) 1946
No. 27	The Public Health (Tuberculosis) (Appointed Day) Regulations (Northern Ireland) 1946
No. 28	
No. 29	The Furniture (Control of Manufacture and Supply) Regulations (Northern Ireland) 1946
No. 30	The Binder Twine Control Order (Northern Ireland) 1946
No. 31	The Disabled Persons (General) Regulations (Northern Ireland) 1946
No. 32	The County Court Rules: Excessive Rents Prevention Rules (Northern Ireland) 1946
No. 33	The Wages Councils and Central Co-ordinating Committees (Conditions of Office) Regulations (Northern Ireland) 1946
No. 34	The Wages Councils (Meetings and Procedure) Regulations (Northern Ireland) 1946
No. 35	The Undertakings (Revocation of Restrictions on Engagements) Order (Northern Ireland) 1946
No. 36	The Prevention of Fraud (Investments) List Regulations (Northern Ireland) 1946
No. 37	The Pharmaceutical Society of Northern Ireland (General) Regulations (Northern Ireland) 1946
No. 38	
No. 39	The Family Allowances (Appointed Days) Order (Northern Ireland) 1946
No. 40	The Family Allowances (Great Britain Reciprocal Arrangements) Regulations (Northern Ireland) 1946
No. 41	The Royal Ulster Constabulary Pay (Amendment) Order (Northern Ireland) 1946
No. 42	The Development Loans (Fishery) Transfer Order (Northern Ireland) 1946
No. 43	The Development Loans (Agricultural) Transfer No. 1 Order (Northern Ireland) 1946
No. 44	The Family Allowances (Verification of Births, etc.) Regulations (Northern Ireland) 1946
No. 45	The Public Health (Tuberculosis) (Appointed Day No. 2) Regulations (Northern Ireland) 1946
No. 46	The Location of Industry (Restrictions) (Revocation) Order (Northern Ireland) 1946
No. 47	The Royal Ulster Constabulary (Women Members) Pensions Order (Northern Ireland) 1946
No. 48	The Ministries (Transfer of Medical Benefit Functions) Order (Northern Ireland) 1946
No. 49	The Boot and Shoe Repairing Wages Council Wages Regulations Order (Northern Ireland) 1946
No. 50	The Disabled Persons (Special Percentage) (Ships) Order (Northern Ireland) 1946
No. 51	The Disabled Persons (Registration) (Amendment) Regulations (Northern Ireland) 1946
No. 52	The National Health Insurance (Medical Benefit) Amendment Regulations (Northern Ireland) 1946
No. 53	The Electoral (Register of Electors) Regulations (Northern Ireland) 1946
No. 54	The Unions and Rural District Councils (Officers' Qualifications) Regulations (Northern Ireland) 1946
No. 55	The Unemployment Insurance (Emergency Powers) (Amendment) Regulations (Northern Ireland) 1946
No. 56	The National Health Insurance (Medical Benefit) Amendment (No. 2) Regulations (Northern Ireland) 1946
No. 57	
No. 58	The Wild Birds (Mute Swan) Protection Order (Northern Ireland) 1946
No. 59	The Poison Regulations (Northern Ireland) 1946
No. 60	
No. 61	The Electoral (Assistant Revising Officers) Regulations (Northern Ireland) 1946
No. 62	The Poor Prisoners (Counsel and Solicitors) Rules (Northern Ireland) 1946
No. 63	The Increase of Pensions (General) (Amendment) Regulations (Northern Ireland) 1946
No. 64	The County Officers and Courts: Appointment of Additional Judge (Northern Ireland) 1946
No. 65	The Woodworking (Amendment of Scope) Special Regulations (Northern Ireland) 1946
No. 66	The Electoral (Remuneration of Officers) Regulations (Northern Ireland) 1946
No. 67	
No. 68	The Ryegrass (Control of Harvesting) Order (Northern Ireland) 1946
No. 69	The Potato Marketing Scheme (Revocation) Order (Northern Ireland) 1946
No. 70 - 73	
No. 74	The Housing Trust (Finance) Regulations (Northern Ireland) 1946
No. 75	The Ryegrass Seed (Control) Order (Northern Ireland) 1946
No. 76 - 78	
No. 79	The Local Authorities (Architects' Qualifications) Regulations (Northern Ireland) 1946
No. 80	The County Councils (Officers' Qualifications) Regulations (Northern Ireland) 1946
No. 81	The County Boroughs (Officers' Qualifications) Regulations (Northern Ireland) 1946
No. 82	The Borough and Urban District Councils (Officers' Qualifications) Regulations (Northern Ireland) 1946
No. 83	
No. 84	The Electoral Register (Postponement of Publication) (Amendment) Order (Northern Ireland) 1946
No. 85 & 86	
No. 87	The Workmen's Compensation (Industrial Diseases) Order (Northern Ireland) 1946
No. 88	The Superannuation (Joint Service) (Amendment) Regulations (Northern Ireland) 1946
No. 89	The Electoral (University Register and Elections) Regulations (Northern Ireland) 1946
No. 90 & 91	
No. 92	The Housing (Management of Accommodation) Regulations (Northern Ireland) 1946
No. 93	The Baking Wages Council Wages Regulations Order (Northern Ireland) 1946
No. 94	The Electoral (Register of Electors) (Amendment) Regulations (Northern Ireland) 1946
No. 95	The Fire Service (General) Regulations (Northern Ireland) 1946
No. 96	The Restriction of Traffic (Revocation) (No. 2) Order (Northern Ireland) 1946
No. 97	The Retail Bespoke Tailoring Wages Council Wages Regulations Order (Northern Ireland) 1946
No. 98	The Furniture (Control of Manufacture and Supply) (No. 2) Order (Northern Ireland) 1946
No. 99	The Utility Furniture (Supply and Acquisition) Order (Northern Ireland) 1946
No. 100	The Domestic Furniture (Utility Mark) Directions (Northern Ireland) 1946
No. 101	
No. 102	The National Health Insurance (Medical Benefit) Amendment (No. 3) Regulations (Northern Ireland) 1946
No. 103	The Sheep Dipping (Special Regulations) Order (Northern Ireland) 1946
No. 104	The Sanitary Sub-Officers Appointments (Revocation) Order (Northern Ireland) 1946
No. 105	The Agricultural Development Loans (No. 1) Regulations (Northern Ireland) 1946
No. 106	The Agricultural Development Loans (No. 2) Regulations (Northern Ireland) 1946
No. 107	The Public Elementary Schools (Salaries and Allowances) (Amendment) Regulations (Northern Ireland) 1946
No. 108	The Public Elementary Schools Amendment (No. 22) Regulations (Northern Ireland) 1946
No. 109	The Public Elementary School (Teachers' War Service) Amending No. 6 Regulations (Northern Ireland) 1946
No. 110	The Road Vehicles (Index Marks) Regulations (Northern Ireland) 1946
No. 111	The Cylinder Capacity Duty (Appointed Day) Order (Northern Ireland) 1946
No. 112	The Marketing of Fruit (Consolidation) Rules (Northern Ireland) 1946
No. 113	
No. 114	The Linen and Cotton Handkerchiefs and Household Goods and Linen Piece Goods Wages Council Wages Regulations Order (Northern Ireland) 1946
No. 115	The Royal Ulster Constabulary (Women Members) Allowances (Amendment) Order (Northern Ireland) 1946
No. 116	The Electoral (Election of Urban District Councillors and Town Commissioners) Regulations (Northern Ireland) 1946
No. 117	The Electoral (Election of County and Rural District Councillors) Regulations (Northern Ireland) 1946
No. 118	The Electoral (Election of Aldermen and Councillors of Co. Boroughs and Boroughs) Regulations (Northern Ireland) 1946
No. 119	
No. 120	The Secondary Schools (Payment of Grants) Regulations (Northern Ireland) 1946
No. 121	The Secondary Teachers (Salaries and Allowances) No. 2 Regulations (Northern Ireland) 1946
No. 122	The National Health Insurance (Medical Benefit) Amendment (No. 4) Regulations (Northern Ireland) 1946
No. 123	
No. 124	The Factories (Fruit and Vegetable Preserving - Hours of Women and Young Persons) Regulations (Northern Ireland) 1946
No. 125	The Importation of Blackcurrant and Gooseberry Bushes and Strawberry Plants Order (Northern Ireland) 1946
No. 126	The Readymade and Wholesale Bespoke Tailoring Wages Council Wages Regulations (Holidays) Order (Northern Ireland) 1946
No. 127	The Unemployment Insurance (Insurance Industry Special Scheme) (Amendment) Order (Northern Ireland) 1946
No. 128	The Coal Supply (Temporary Provisions) (Northern Ireland) Order (Northern Ireland) 1946
No. 129	The Electoral (Returning Officer's Certificate) Regulations (Northern Ireland) 1946
No. 130	The Pre-cast Walling Units (Control) Order (Northern Ireland) 1946
No. 131	The Potato Marketing Scheme (Approval) Order (Northern Ireland) 1946
No. 132	The Retail Bespoke Tailoring Wages Council Wages Regulations (Amendment) Order (Northern Ireland) 1946
No. 133	The Shirt Making Wages Council Wages Regulations Order (Northern Ireland) 1946
No. 134	The Laundry Wages Council Wages Regulations Order (Northern Ireland) 1946
No. 135	The Baking Wages Council (Northern Ireland) Wages Regulations Order (Northern Ireland) 1946
No. 136	The Electoral (Parliamentary Elections) Regulations (Northern Ireland) 1946
No. 137	The Readymade and Wholesale Bespoke Tailoring Wages Council Wages Regulations Order (Northern Ireland) 1946
No. 138	The Boot and Shoe Repairing Wages Council Wages Regulations Order (Northern Ireland) 1946
No. 139	The Disabled Persons (General) (Amendment) Regulations (Northern Ireland) 1946
No. 140	The Disabled Persons (Designated Employments) Order (Northern Ireland) 1946
No. 141	The Public Health and Local Government (Administrative Provisions) (Appointed Day) Regulations (Northern Ireland) 1946
No. 142	
No. 143	The Shirt Making Wages Council Wages Regulations (Holidays) Order (Northern Ireland) 1946
No. 144	The Quarries (First-Aid) Order (Northern Ireland) 1946
No. 145	The Rope Twine and Net Wages Council Wages Regulations Order (Northern Ireland) 1946
No. 146	The Linen and Cotton Handkerchief and Household Goods and Linen Piece Goods Wages Council Wages Regulations Order (Northern Ireland) 1946
No. 147 & 148	
No. 149	The Scutch Mills and Flax (Fire Insurance) (Amendment) Regulations (Northern Ireland) 1946
No. 150	The National Insurance (Non-Contributory Old Age Pensions) Regulations (Northern Ireland) 1946
No. 151 & 152	
No. 153	The Baking Wages Council Wages Regulations (Holidays) Order (Northern Ireland) 1946
No. 154	The Public Health and Local Government (Administrative Provisions) (Appointed Day No. 2) Regulations (Northern Ireland) 1946
No. 155	The Housing (Owner Occupation) Regulations (Northern Ireland) 1946
No. 156	The Housing (Houses built for Letting) Regulations (Northern Ireland) 1946
No. 157	The Wholesale Mantle and Costume Wages Council Wages Regulations (Holidays) Order (Northern Ireland) 1946
No. 158	The Control of Employment (Agriculture) (Amendment) Order (Northern Ireland) 1946
No. 159	The General Waste Materials Reclamation Wages Council Wages Regulations Order (Northern Ireland) 1946
No. 160	The Chromium Plating Special Regulations (Northern Ireland) 1946
No. 161	The Summary Jurisdiction Separation and Maintenance Rules (Northern Ireland) 1946
No. 162	The Furniture (Control of Manufacture and Supply) (No. 3) Order (Northern Ireland) 1946
No. 163	The Domestic Furniture (Utility Mark) (No. 2) Directions (Northern Ireland) 1946
No. 164	The Wholesale Mantle and Costume Wages Council Wages Regulations Order (Northern Ireland) 1946
No. 165	The Control of Fertilisers Order (Northern Ireland) 1946
No. 166	The National Health Insurance (Dental Benefit) Amendment Regulations (Northern Ireland) 1946
No. 167	The Factories (Operations at Unfenced Machinery - Amended Schedule) Regulations (Northern Ireland) 1946
No. 168	
No. 169	The Aerated Waters Wages Council Wages Regulations Order (Northern Ireland) 1946
No. 170	The Dressmaking and Women's Light Clothing Wages Council Wages Regulations Order (Northern Ireland) 1946
No. 171	The Dressmaking and Women's Light Clothing Wages Council Wages Regulations (Holidays) Order (Northern Ireland) 1946
No. 172	The Sugar Confectionery and Food Preserving Wages Council Wages Regulations Order (Northern Ireland) 1946
No. 173	The Shirt Making Wages Council Wages Regulations (Amendment) Order (Northern Ireland) 1946
No. 174	The Baking Wages Council Wages Regulations (Holidays) (Amendment) Order (Northern Ireland) 1946
No. 175	The Aerated Waters Wages Council Wages Regulations (Holidays) Order (Northern Ireland) 1946
No. 176	The National Insurance (Increase of Contributory Pensions) Regulations (Northern Ireland) 1946
No. 177	The Road Vehicles (Registration and Licensing) (Amendment) Regulations (Northern Ireland) 1946
No. 178	The Housing (Houses built for Letting) (Amendment) Regulations (Northern Ireland) 1946
No. 179	The Housing (Owner Occupation) (Amendment) Regulations (Northern Ireland) 1946
No. 180	The Unemployment Insurance (Insurance Industry Special Scheme) (Amendment) (No. 3) Order (Northern Ireland) 1946
No. 181	The Port Sanitary Regulations (Northern Ireland) 1946
No. 182	The Tillage General Order (Northern Ireland) 1946
No. 183	
No. 184	The Royal Ulster Constabulary Pensions (Amendment) Order (Northern Ireland) 1946
No. 185	The Sugar Confectionery and Food Preserving Wages Council Wages Regulations (Holidays) Order (Northern Ireland) 1946
No. 186	The Readymade and Wholesale Bespoke Tailoring Wages Council Regulations (Holidays) (Amendment) Order (Northern Ireland) 1946
No. 187	The Disabled Persons (Standard Percentage) (No. 2) Order (Northern Ireland) 1946
No. 188	The Unemployment Insurance (Insurance Industry Special Scheme) (Amendment) (No. 2) Order (Northern Ireland) 1946
No. 189	The Superannuation (Joint Service) (Amendment) No. 2 Regulations (Northern Ireland) 1946
No. 190	The Civil Engineering Materials and Contractors' Plant (Control) Order (Northern Ireland) 1946
No. 191	The National Insurance (Increase of Old Age Pensions) Regulations (Northern Ireland) 1946
No. 192	The Government Loans (Reduction in Rates of Interest) No. 2 Order (Northern Ireland) 1946
No. 193	The Documents of Identity Revocation Order (Northern Ireland) 1946
No. 194	The Royal Ulster Constabulary (Women Members) Pay Order (Northern Ireland) 1946
No. 195	The Brush and Broom Wages Council Wages Regulations Order (Northern Ireland) 1946
No. 196	The Electoral (Local Government Casual Vacancies - Poll) Regulations (Northern Ireland) 1946
No. 197	The Intoxicating Liquor (Finance) Rules (Northern Ireland) 1946
No. 198	The Public Health and Local Government (Administrative Provisions) (Appointed Day No. 3) Regulations (Northern Ireland) 1946
No. 199	The Boot and Shoe Repairing Wages Council Wages Regulations (Amendment) (Northern Ireland) 1946
No. 200	The Boot and Shoe Repairing Wages Council Wages Regulations (Holidays) Order (Northern Ireland) 1946
No. 201	The Baking Wages Council Wages Regulations (No. 2) Order (Northern Ireland) 1946
No. 202	The Dog Races (Restriction) Order (Northern Ireland) 1946
No. 203	The Secondary Schools Examinations Regulations Amendment Regulations No. 6 (Northern Ireland) 1946
No. 204	The Bacon Industry (Pig Nutrition Research Grant) Order (Northern Ireland) 1946
No. 205	The Housing Subsidy Order (Northern Ireland) 1946
No. 206	The Linen and Cotton Handkerchiefs and Household Goods and Linen Piece Goods Wages Council Wages Regulations Amendment Act (Northern Ireland) 1946
No. 207	The Rate of Interest (Housing) Order (Northern Ireland) 1946
No. 208	The Exported Animals Compensation Acts (Northern Ireland) 1928-1938 (Suspension of Charges) Order (Northern Ireland) 1946
No. 209	The Local Government County Councils (Travelling Expenses) Regulations (Northern Ireland) 1946
No. 210	
No. 211	The Linen and Cotton Embroidery Wages Council Wages Regulations Order (Northern Ireland) 1946
No. 212	The Retail Bespoke Tailoring Wages Council Wages Regulations (Amendment) (No. 2) Order (Northern Ireland) 1946
No. 213	The Retail Bespoke Tailoring Wages Council Wages Regulations (Holidays) Order (Northern Ireland) 1946
No. 214	The Public Elementary Schools Regulations 1934 Amendment Regulations No. 23 (Northern Ireland) 1946
No. 215	The Road Vehicles (Index Marks) (No. 2) Regulations (Northern Ireland) 1946
No. 216	The Industrial Assurance and Friendly Societies (Cert. of Date of Final Determination of Protection) Order (Northern Ireland) 1946
No. 217	The Marketing of Fruit (Amendment) Rules (Northern Ireland) 1946
No. 218	The Paper Box Wages Council Wages Regulations Order (Northern Ireland) 1946
No. 219	The Paper Box Wages Council Wages Regulations (Holidays) Order (Northern Ireland) 1946
No. 220	The Essential Work (Merchant Navy) Revocation Order (Northern Ireland) 1946
No. 221	The Motor Cars (Use and Construction) (Amendment) Regulations (Northern Ireland) 1946
No. 222	The National Health Insurance (Medical Benefit) Amendment (No. 5) Regulations (Northern Ireland) 1946
No. 223	The Increase of Pensions (General) (Amendment) No. 2 Regulations (Northern Ireland) 1946
No. 224	The Supplementary pensions (Determination of Need and Assessment of Needs) (Amendment) Regulations (Northern Ireland) 1946
No. 225	The Unemployment Assistance (Determination of Need and Assessment of Needs) (Amendment) Regulations (Northern Ireland) 1946
No. 226	The Coal Supply (Temporary Provisions) No. 2 (Northern Ireland) Order (Northern Ireland) 1946
No. 227	
No. 228	The National Insurance (Approved Societies' Investments) Regulations (Northern Ireland) 1946
No. 229	The Electoral (Parliamentary Returning Officers' Charges) Regulations (Northern Ireland) 1946

== See also ==
- List of statutory rules of Northern Ireland
