= List of statutory rules and orders of Northern Ireland, 1956 =

This is an incomplete list of statutory rules and orders of Northern Ireland during 1956. Statutory rules and orders were the predecessor of statutory rules and they formed the secondary legislation of Northern Ireland between 1922 and 1973.

Number	Title
1956 No. 1	The Poor Persons (Defence Certificates) Rules (Northern Ireland) 1956
1956 No. 2	The Employment and Training (Advisory Committees) Regulations (Northern Ireland) 1956
1956 No. 3	The Bee Pest Prevention (Amendment) Regulations (Northern Ireland) 1956
1956 No. 5	The Training Colleges (Scholarships) Regulations (Northern Ireland) 1956
1956 No. 6	The Road Traffic Act (Northern Ireland) 1955 (Date of Commencement) Order (Northern Ireland) 1956
1956 No. 7	The Agricultural Development (Eradication of Rushes on Marginal Land) Extension Scheme (Northern Ireland) 1956
1956 No. 8	The National Insurance (Determination of Claims and Questions) Amendment Regulations (Northern Ireland) 1956
1956 No. 9	The Training Colleges (Grant Conditions) Regulations (Northern Ireland) 1956
1956 No. 10	The Summary Jurisdiction: Petty Sessions Districts and Times (Northern Ireland) 1956
1956 No. 11	The Grammar School (Salaries and Allowances of Teachers) Amendment Regulations (Northern Ireland) 1956
1956 No. 14	The Dressmaking and Women's Light Clothing Wages Council (Northern Ireland) Regulations (Amendment) (No. 1) Order (Northern Ireland) 1956
1956 No. 15	The Educational Services (Imperial Institute) Grants Regulations (Northern Ireland) 1956
1956 No. 16	The Supreme Court Fees Order (Northern Ireland) 1956
1956 No. 17	The Dressmaking and Women's Light Clothing Wages Council (Northern Ireland) Regulations (Amendment) (No. 2) Order (Northern Ireland) 1956
1956 No. 18	The County Court Sittings (Armagh) Order (Northern Ireland) 1956
1956 No. 19	The Order in Council Amendment the Third Schedule to the Medicines, Pharmacy and Poisons Act (Northern Ireland) 1956
1956 No. 22	The Inland Navigation (Compensation) Regulations (Northern Ireland) 1956
1956 No. 24	The Pigs Marketing (Purchase Incidentals) Order 1939 (Revocation) Order (Northern Ireland) 1956
1956 No. 25	The Poisons Regulations (Northern Ireland) 1956
1956 No. 26	The Acreage payments (Specified Produce Crops) Scheme (Northern Ireland) 1956
1956 No. 27	The Health Services (General Dental Services Fees) (Amendment) Regulations (Northern Ireland) 1956
1956 No. 28	The National Insurance (Reciprocal Agreement with New Zealand) Order (Northern Ireland) 1956
1956 No. 29	The High Court of Justice in Northern Ireland Queen's Bench Division (Probate) (Northern Ireland) 1956
1956 No. 32	The National Insurance (Unemployment and Sickness Benefit) Amendment Regulations (Northern Ireland) 1956
1956 No. 33	The Goods Vehicles (Licensing Fees) Regulations (Northern Ireland) 1956
1956 No. 34	The Public Service Vehicles (Licensing Fees) Regulations (Northern Ireland) 1956
1956 No. 36	The Training Schools (Contributions by Local Authorities) Regulations (Northern Ireland) 1956
1956 No. 37	The Road Vehicles (Registration and Licensing) (Amendment) Regulations (Northern Ireland) 1956
1956 No. 38	The Health Services (Travelling Expenses) (Amendment) Regulations (Northern Ireland) 1956
1956 No. 40	The Accredited Poultry Farms Scheme (Northern Ireland) 1956
1956 No. 41	The Aid to Industry (Amendment) (No. 3) Order (Northern Ireland) 1956
1956 No. 42	The Compulsory Acquisition of Land (Interest on Compensation Money) Order (Northern Ireland) 1956
1956 No. 44	The Milk Marketing Scheme (Northern Ireland) (Amendment No. 2) Order (Northern Ireland) 1956
1956 No. 45	The Boot and Shoe Repairing Wages Council (Northern Ireland) Wages Regulations (Amendment) Order (Northern Ireland) 1956
1956 No. 46	The Brush and Broom Wages Council (Northern Ireland) Wages Regulations (Amendment) Order (Northern Ireland) 1956
1956 No. 48	The Lough Neagh (Levels) Scheme Order (Northern Ireland) 1956
1956 No. 49	The Royal Ulster Constabulary Pensions (Amendment) Order (Northern Ireland) 1956
1956 No. 50	The Foyle Area (Rivers Finn and Foyle) (Close Season for Angling) Regulations (Northern Ireland) 1956
1956 No. 51	The Foyle Area (Control of Netting) Regulations (Northern Ireland) 1956
1956 No. 52	The Supreme Court Rules (Northern Ireland) Order in Council (Northern Ireland) 1956
1956 No. 53	The Hat, Cap and Millinery Wages Council (Northern Ireland) Wages Regulations (No. 1) Order (Northern Ireland) 1956
1956 No. 54	The Hat, Cap and Millinery Wages Council (Northern Ireland) Wages Regulations (No. 2) Order (Northern Ireland) 1956
1956 No. 55	The Baking Wages Council (Northern Ireland) Wages Regulations (Amendment) (No. 1) Order (Northern Ireland) 1956
1956 No. 56	The Registration of Births, Deaths and Marriages (Fees) Order (Northern Ireland) 1956
1956 No. 57	The Linen and Cotton Handkerchief and Household Goods and Linen Piece Goods Wages Council (Northern Ireland) Wages Regulations Order (Northern Ireland) 1956
1956 No. 59	The Blackface (Mourne) Rams Scheme (Northern Ireland) 1956
1956 No. 61	The Births (Registration of Alteration of Name) Regulations (Northern Ireland) 1956
1956 No. 62	The General Waste Materials Reclamation Wages Council (Northern Ireland) Wages Regulations (Amendment) Order (Northern Ireland) 1956
1956 No. 63	The Ulster Savings Certificates (Eighth Issue) (Amendment) Regulations (Northern Ireland) 1956
1956 No. 64	The Coal Distribution (Restriction) Order (Northern Ireland) 1956
1956 No. 65	The Meat Examination Fees Order (Northern Ireland) 1956
1956 No. 66	The Training Colleges (Admission of Students in 1956) Regulations (Northern Ireland) 1956
1956 No. 67	The Summary Jurisdiction: Petty Sessions Districts and Times Order (Northern Ireland) 1956
1956 No. 68	The Milk Marketing Scheme (Northern Ireland) (Amendment No. 3) Order (Northern Ireland) 1956
1956 No. 69	The Nursery Classes in Primary Schools Regulations (Northern Ireland) 1956
1956 No. 70	The Baking Wages Council (Northern Ireland) Wages Regulations (Amendment) (No. 2) Order (Northern Ireland) 1956
1956 No. 71	The Baking Wages Council (Northern Ireland) Wages Regulations (Amendment) (No. 3) Order (Northern Ireland) 1956
1956 No. 72	The Baking Wages Council (Northern Ireland) Wages Regulations (Amendment) (No. 4) Order (Northern Ireland) 1956
1956 No. 75	The Ulster Special Constabulary Pensions (Amendment) Regulations (Northern Ireland) 1956
1956 No. 76	The Motor Cars (Use and Construction) (Amendment) Regulations (Northern Ireland) 1956
1956 No. 77	The Land Registry of Northern Ireland (Administration of Estates) Rules (Northern Ireland) 1956
1956 No. 78	The Acreage Payments (Potatoes) Scheme (Northern Ireland) 1956
1956 No. 79	The Acreage Payments (Specified Produce Crops) Scheme No. 2 (Northern Ireland) 1956
1956 No. 80	The Resident Magistrates (Salaries and Allowances) Order (Northern Ireland) 1956
1956 No. 81	The Sheep Dipping Order (Northern Ireland) 1956
1956 No. 82	The Retail Bespoke Tailoring Wages Council (Northern Ireland) Wages Regulations Order (Northern Ireland) 1956
1956 No. 83	The Road Traffic Act (Northern Ireland) 1956 (Date of Commencement) (No. 2) Order (Northern Ireland) 1956
1956 No. 86	The Royal Ulster Constabulary Pay Order (Northern Ireland) 1956
1956 No. 87	The Royal Ulster Constabulary (Women Members) Pay Order (Northern Ireland) 1956
1956 No. 88	The Erne Drainage and Development (Control of Levels) Order (Northern Ireland) 1956
1956 No. 89	The Laundry Wages Council (Northern Ireland) Wages Regulations Order (Northern Ireland) 1956
1956 No. 90	The Laundry Wages Council (Northern Ireland) Wages Regulations (Holidays) (Amendment) Order (Northern Ireland) 1956
1956 No. 93	The Milk and Meals Amendment Regulations (Northern Ireland) 1956
1956 No. 94	The Housing (Houses Built for Letting) Regulations (Northern Ireland) 1956
1956 No. 95	The Housing (Owner Occupation) Regulations (Northern Ireland) 1956
1956 No. 96	The Trunk Roads (South Approach Road) Order (Northern Ireland) 1956
1956 No. 98	The Aerated Waters Wages Council (Northern Ireland) Wages Regulations (Amendment) Order (Northern Ireland) 1956
1956 No. 99	The Local Government (Superannuation) County Court Rules (Northern Ireland) 1956
1956 No. 102	The Rope, Twine and Net Wages Council (Northern Ireland) Wages Regulations (Amendment) Order (Northern Ireland) 1956
1956 No. 103	The Housing (Grants) Order (Northern Ireland) 1956
1956 No. 105	The Births, Deaths and Marriages Registration Order (Northern Ireland) 1956
1956 No. 106	The Local Government (Allowances to Members) (Amendment) Regulations (Northern Ireland) 1956
1956 No. 108	The Housing on Farms Regulations (Northern Ireland) 1956
1956 No. 109	The Ulster Savings Certificates (Ninth Issue) Regulations (Northern Ireland) 1956
1956 No. 110	The Grammar School (Grant Conditions) Regulations (Northern Ireland) 1956
1956 No. 113	The Summary Jurisdiction (Service of Summons) Rules (Northern Ireland) 1956
1956 No. 114	The Voluntary Grammar Schools Milk and Meals Grants Amendment Regulations (Northern Ireland) 1956
1956 No. 115	The Pharmaceutical Society of Northern Ireland (General) Regulations (Northern Ireland) 1956
1956 No. 116	The Process Servers' Fees Order (Northern Ireland) 1956
1956 No. 117	The Poisons Regulations (Northern Ireland) 1956
1956 No. 118	The Poisons List Confirmation Order (Northern Ireland) 1956
1956 No. 119	The Health Services (Travelling Expenses) (Amendment) (No. 2) Regulations (Northern Ireland) 1956
1956 No. 120	The Paper Box Wages Council (Northern Ireland) Wages Regulations (Amendment) Order (Northern Ireland) 1956
1956 No. 121	The Workmen's Compensation (Supplementation) Commencement Order (Northern Ireland) 1956
1956 No. 122	The Family Allowances, National Insurance and Industrial Injuries (Commencement) Order (Northern Ireland) 1956
1956 No. 123	The Malone Training School (Contributions) Regulations (Northern Ireland) 1956
1956 No. 124	The Roads (Speed Limit) Order (Northern Ireland) 1956
1956 No. 125	The Road Traffic Act (N.I.) 1955 (Date of Commencement) (No. 3) Order (Northern Ireland) 1956
1956 No. 126	The Industrial Injuries (Prescribed Diseases) Amendment (No. 2) Regulations (Northern Ireland) 1956
1956 No. 127	The Workmen's Compensation (Supplementation) Regulations (Northern Ireland) 1956
1956 No. 128	The Marketing of Ryegrass Seed Regulations (Northern Ireland) 1956
1956 No. 129	The Belfast Harbour Estate (Speed Limit) Order (Northern Ireland) 1956
1956 No. 130	The Importation of Swine from the Irish Republic Order (Northern Ireland) 1956
1956 No. 132	The Weights and Measures (Verification and Stamping Fees) Order (Northern Ireland) 1956
1956 No. 133	The Marketing of Ryegrass Seed Regulations No. 2 (Northern Ireland) 1956
1956 No. 134	The Motor Vehicles (Use and Construction) Regulations (Northern Ireland) 1956
1956 No. 135	The Marketing of Fruit Rules (Northern Ireland) 1956
1956 No. 136	The National Insurance (Industrial Injuries) (Widow's Benefit and Miscellaneous Provisions) Regulations (Northern Ireland) 1956
1956 No. 138	The National Insurance (Widow's Benefit and Miscellaneous Provisions) Regulations (Northern Ireland) 1956
1956 No. 139	The National Insurance (Industrial Injuries) (Benefit) Amendment Regulations (Northern Ireland) 1956
1956 No. 140	The Swine Fever Order (Northern Ireland) 1956
1956 No. 141	The Poor Persons (Legal Aid Certificates) Rules (Northern Ireland) 1956
1956 No. 142	The Motor Vehicles (Driving Licences) Regulations (Northern Ireland) 1956
1956 No. 143	The Drivers' Licences (Great Britain) Certificate (Northern Ireland) 1956
1956 No. 144	The Road Traffic Act (Northern Ireland) 1955 (Date of Commencement) (No. 4) Order (Northern Ireland) 1956
1956 No. 145	The Royal Ulster Constabulary Allowances (Amendment) Order (Northern Ireland) 1956
1956 No. 146	The Royal Ulster Constabulary (Women Members) Pay (Amendment) Order (Northern Ireland) 1956
1956 No. 147	The Agricultural Development (Fertiliser) Scheme (Northern Ireland) 1956
1956 No. 148	The Family Allowances (Conditions for increase of Allowance) Regulations (Northern Ireland) 1956
1956 No. 149	The Motor Vehicles (Use and Construction) (Track Laying Vehicles) Regulations (Northern Ireland) 1956
1956 No. 150	The Health Services (General Medical and Pharmaceutical Services) Regulations (Northern Ireland) 1956
1956 No. 152	The Motor Vehicles (Authorisation of Special Types) General Order (Northern Ireland) 1956
1956 No. 153	The Malone and Whiteabbey Training Schools (Supplementary Provisions) Order (Northern Ireland) 1956
1956 No. 155	The Importation of Carnation Cutting Order (Northern Ireland) 1956
1956 No. 157	The Housing on Farms (Grants) Order (Northern Ireland) 1956
1956 No. 158	The Transport Act (Abandonment of Railway Lines, Counties Londonderry and Tyrone) Order (Northern Ireland) 1956
1956 No. 159	The Transport Act (Abandonment of Railway Lines, Counties Armagh and Down) Order (Northern Ireland) 1956
1956 No. 160	The Transport Act (Abandonment of Railway Lines, Counties Antrim and Londonderry) (No. 2) Order (Northern Ireland) 1956
1956 No. 161	The Prison Prescribed Employments (Variation) Order (Northern Ireland) 1956
1956 No. 162	The Rate of Interest (Housing) (No. 3) Order (Northern Ireland) 1956
1956 No. 164	The Importation of Swine from Irish Republic (Amendment) Order (Northern Ireland) 1956
1956 No. 165	The Fire Services (Conditions of Service) Regulations (Northern Ireland) 1956
1956 No. 166	The Sugar Confectionery and Food Preserving Wages Council (Northern Ireland) Wages Regulations (Amendment) Order (Northern Ireland) 1956
1956 No. 167	The Capital Grants to Industry Amendment Regulations (Northern Ireland) 1956
1956 No. 169	The Health Services General Scheme Modification Order (Northern Ireland) 1956
1956 No. 172	The Road Haulage Wages Council (Northern Ireland) Wages Regulations (Amendment) (No. 2) Order (Northern Ireland) 1956
1956 No. 173	The Electoral (Parliamentary Returning Officers' Charges) (Amendment) Regulations (Northern Ireland) 1956
1956 No. 174	The Housing (Management of Accommodation) (Amendment) Regulations (Northern Ireland) 1956
1956 No. 175	The Agricultural Development (Amendment) Scheme (Northern Ireland) 1956
1956 No. 176	The Road Vehicles (Traffic) Regulations (Northern Ireland) 1956
1956 No. 177	The Housing (Public Utility Societies: Interest on Share or Loan Capital) Order (Northern Ireland) 1956
1956 No. 178	The Baking Wages Council (Northern Ireland) Wages Regulations (Amendment) (No. 5) Order (Northern Ireland) 1956
1956 No. 179	The Baking Wages Council (Northern Ireland) Wages Regulations (Amendment) (No. 6) Order (Northern Ireland) 1956
1956 No. 180	The Baking Wages Council (Northern Ireland) Wages Regulations (Amendment) (No. 7) Order (Northern Ireland) 1956
1956 No. 181	The Census of Production (Exemption) Order (Northern Ireland) 1956
1956 No. 182	The Agricultural (Marginal Production Seeds and Fertilisers) Scheme (Northern Ireland) 1956
1956 No. 183	The Bakehouses (Sunday before Christmas) Order (Northern Ireland) 1956
1956 No. 186	The Fertilisers and Feeding Stuffs (Northern Ireland) (Amendment) Regulations (Northern Ireland) 1956
1956 No. 187	The Housing Subsidy Order (Northern Ireland) 1956
1956 No. 189	The Supreme Court Rules (Northern Ireland) (No. 2) Order in Council (Northern Ireland) 1956
1956 No. 190	The General Revaluation (Notice to Persons) Regulations (Northern Ireland) 1956
1956 No. 191	The Civil Authorities (Special Powers) Acts (Amendment) Regulations (Northern Ireland) 1956
1956 No. 192	The Transport Act (Abandonment of Railway Lines, Counties Antrim and Down) Order (Northern Ireland) 1956
1956 No. 193	The County Court Sittings (Tyrone) Order (Northern Ireland) 1956
1956 No. 194	The Milk and Meals Amendment Regulations No. 2 (Northern Ireland) 1956
1956 No. 195	The Linen and Cotton Handkerchief and Household Goods and Linen Piece Goods Wages Council (Northern Ireland) Wages Regulations (Amendment) Order (Northern Ireland) 1956
1956 No. 196	The Health Services (Charges for Drugs and Appliances) (Amendment) Regulations (Northern Ireland) 1956
1956 No. 197	The Health Services (Hospital Charges for Drugs and Appliances, etc.) (Amendment) Regulations (Northern Ireland) 1956
1956 No. 198	The Firearms (Certificates and Permits) Rules (Northern Ireland) 1956
1956 No. 199	The Civil Authorities (Special Powers) Acts (Amendment) (No. 2) Regulations (Northern Ireland) 1956
1956 No. 204	The Civil Authorities (Special Powers) Acts (Amendment) (No. 3) Regulations (Northern Ireland) 1956
1956 No. 205	The Wholesale Mantle and Costume Wages Council (Northern Ireland) Wages Regulations Order (Northern Ireland) 1956
1956 No. 206	The Readymade and Wholesale Bespoke Tailoring Wages Council (Northern Ireland) Wages Regulations (Amendment) Order (Northern Ireland) 1956
1956 No. 207	The Housing on Farms (Grants) (No. 2) Order (Northern Ireland) 1956
1956 No. 208	The Flax (General) Regulations (Northern Ireland) 1956
1956 No. 209	The Marketing of Fruit (Amendment) Rules (Northern Ireland) 1956
1956 No. 210	The Heating, Lighting, Cleaning and Internal Maintenance Amendment Regulations (Northern Ireland) 1956
1956 No. 211	The National Insurance (Residence and Persons Abroad) Amendment Regulations (Northern Ireland) 1956
1956 No. 212	The National Insurance (Contributions) Amendment Regulations (Northern Ireland) 1956

== See also ==
- List of statutory rules of Northern Ireland
